= Genital piercing =

Form of body piercing on a part of the genitalia

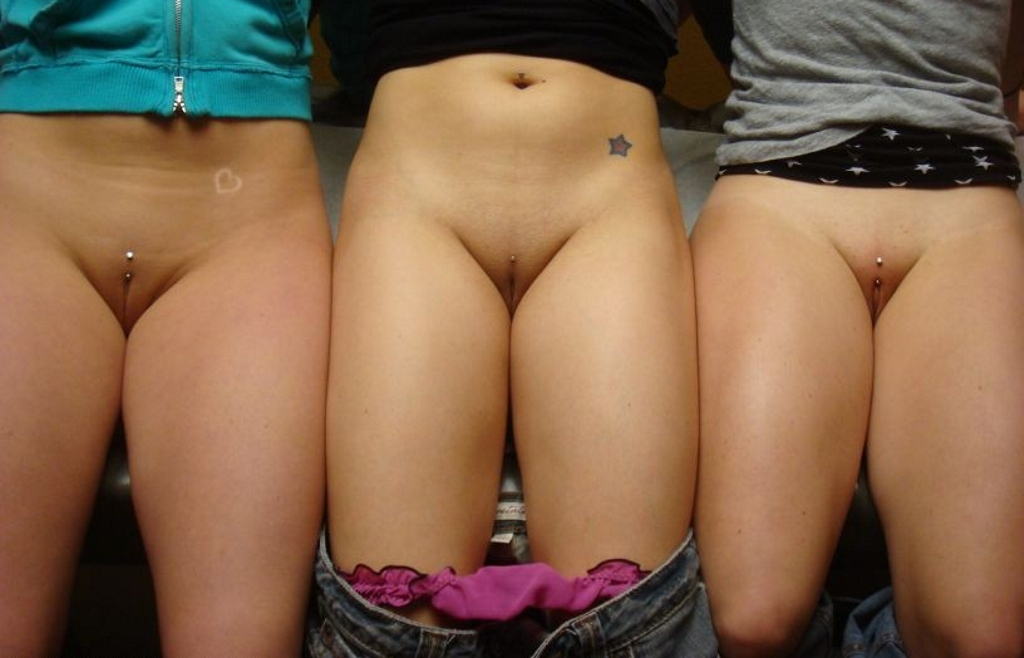
Vulva piercings: Nefertiti (middle) and Christina piercings

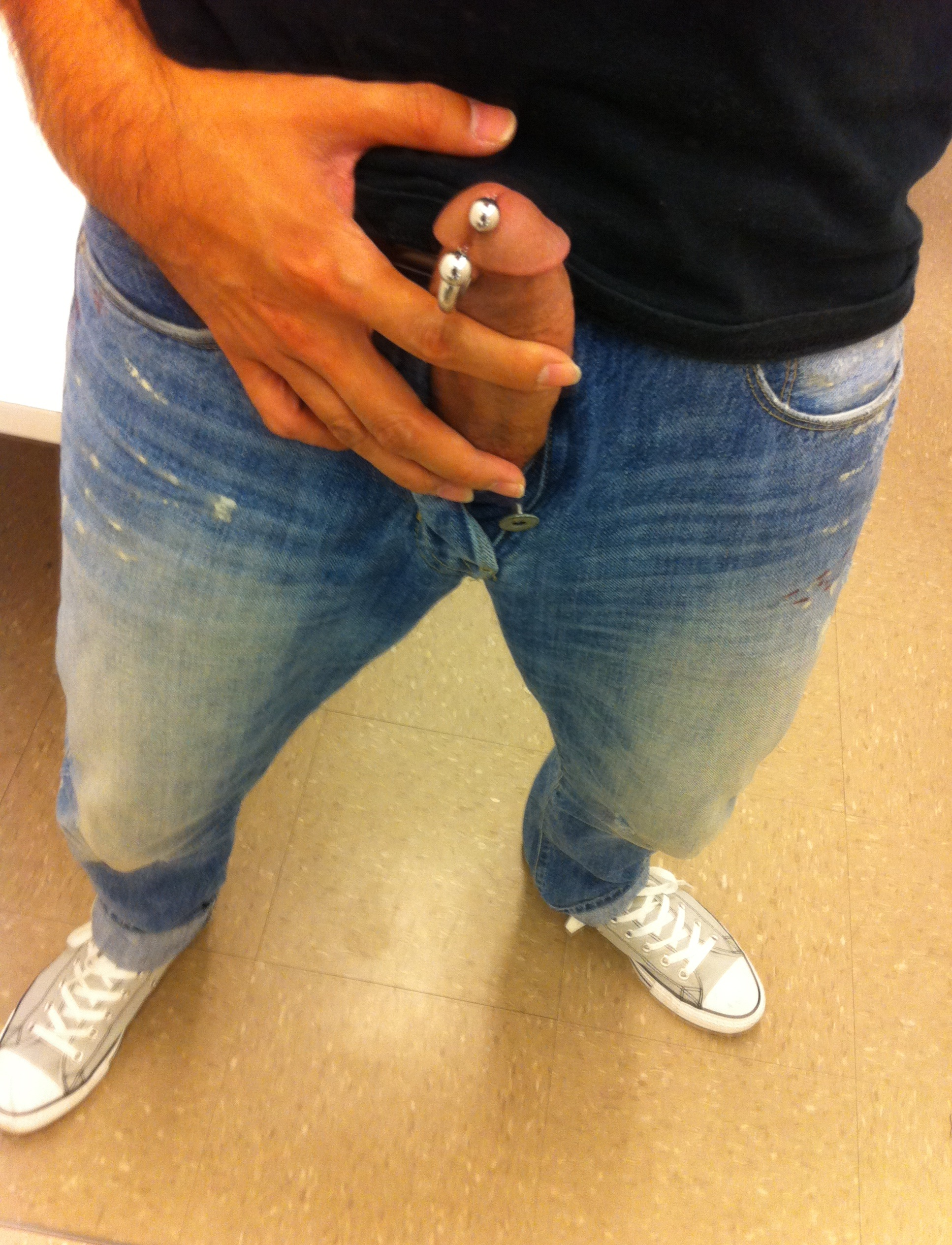
Penis piercing: Prince Albert piercing

Genital piercing is a form of body piercing that involves piercing a part of the genitalia or in the area of the anus, perineum, penis, scrotum, and vulva. Anal, guiche, and pubic piercings do not involve perforation of genitalia itself. Genital piercings can be done regardless of sex, with various forms of piercings available. The main motive is beautification and individualization; in addition, some piercings enhance sexual pleasure by increasing stimulation. Pre-modern genital piercings were most culturally widespread in Southeast Asia, where it had been part of traditional practice since ancient times. Records of genital piercing are found in the Kama Sutra.

== History ==
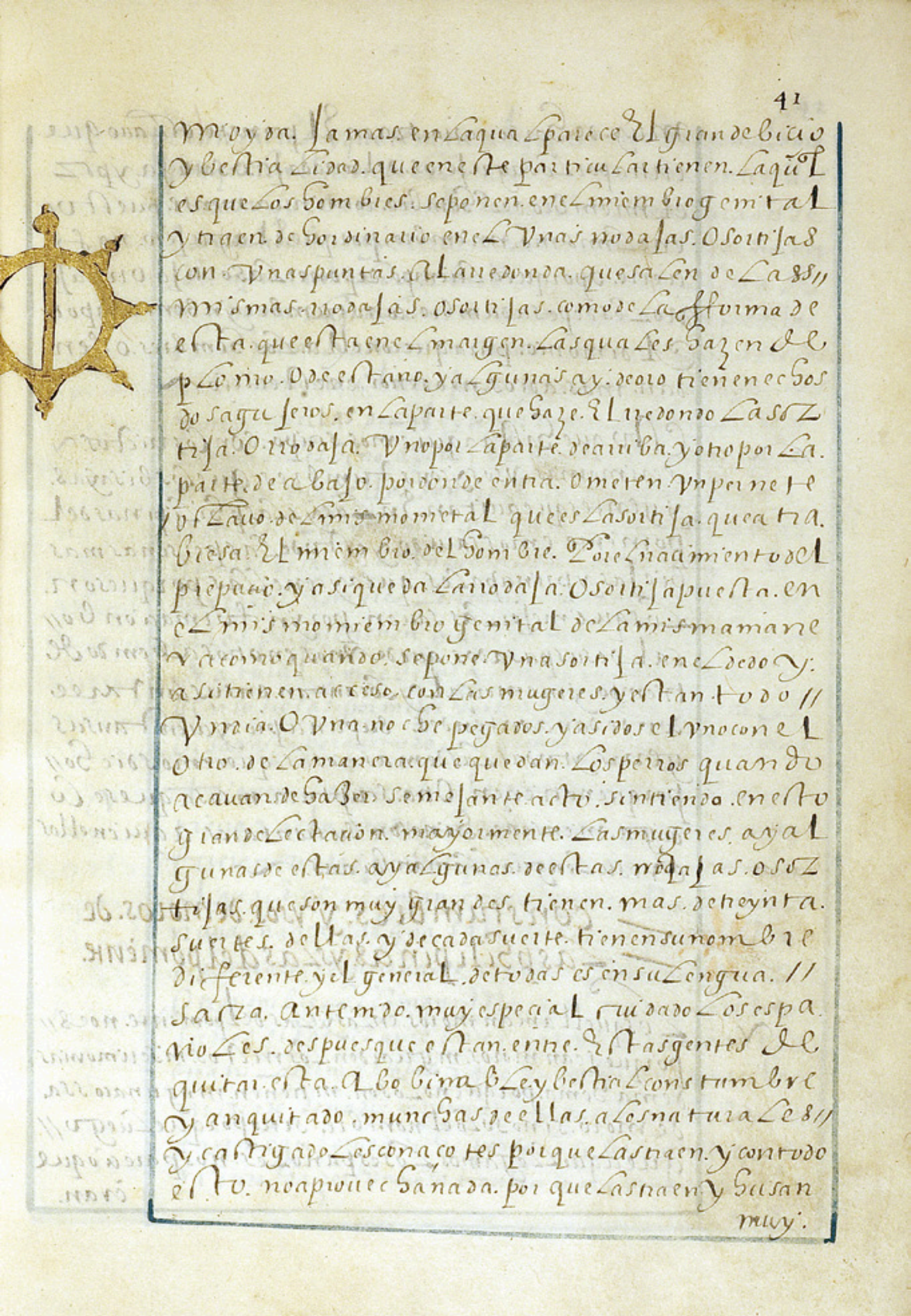
Gilt marginalia on the Boxer Codex (c. 1590) with the only known illustration of the pre-colonial Visayan tugbuk and sakra genital piercing from the Philippines

The traditional prehistoric and historic practice of genital piercing was most culturally widespread in Southeast Asia (particularly in Indonesia, the Philippines, Thailand, Malaysia, and Myanmar), where the insertion of various kinds of implants into the penis were common until modern times, in addition to other ancient body modifications like tattooing, supercision or circumcision, pearling, ear piercings and ear plugs, gold teeth fillings, teeth filing, teeth blackening, and artificial cranial deformation. The primary purpose of such inserts were to enhance pleasure. The practice also spread to neighboring regions, where scattered references to genital piercings exist, like the South Asian apadravya, a male genital piercing that passes vertically through the glans (unlike most Southeast Asian piercings which are inserted horizontally), in the Kama Sutra (2nd century AD). Other smaller traditions of genital piercings also arose independently in other cultures (like in Central America).

In the Philippines, penile piercings were widely documented by European explorers among the Visayan people. Visayan penile piercings consists of a rod or bar (usually made from gold, brass, tin, or ivory; and often ornamented) called the tugbuk or tudruk that is inserted horizontally through the glans of the penis. Its ends are attached to the sakra (also transcribed as sacra or sagra), a wheel or half-ring (made from the same material as the tugbuk) that goes around the head of the penis, similar to a cock ring. The sakra comes in many variants, but is usually ornamented with blunt knobs around the circumference. The ends of the tugbuk are then secured to the sakra with plugs (also often ornamented). The Italian explorer Antonio Pigafetta who accompanied Ferdinand Magellan in the first circumnavigation of the globe describes the practice as such:

The males, both large and small, have the head of their member pierced from one side to the other, with a pin of gold or of tin as thick as a goose feather, and at each end of this pin some have a star-shaped decoration like a button, and others, one like the head of a cart nail… In the middle of this pin or tube is a hole through which they urinate, and the pin and the stars always remain firm, holding the member stiff.

— Antonio Pigafetta, Relazione del primo viaggio intorno al mondo (1550-1559),

The anonymously-written Boxer Codex (c. 1590s) also has a similar description:

Two holes are fashioned in the round part of the hoop or ring, one on the top and the other on the bottom, through which a small bolt or pin made of the same metal as the ring is inserted and which is then thrust through the man's member as the base of his foreskin. And thus the hoop or ring (sakra) is worn on the genital member itself in the same way a ring is worn on a finger.

— Unknown, Boxer Codex (c. 1590s),

These piercings were done to boys at an early age. They were meant to enhance sensation and pleasure during sexual activity for both men and women. Notably, Pigafetta describes that it was the women who controlled how the penis with the sakra is inserted. Men without penile piercings were reported to be derided by women as asog ("impotent" or "effeminate"). The practice was heavily suppressed by the Spanish clergy and eventually lost during the Spanish colonial period of the Philippines, as it was considered by the Spanish clergy to be a "sin of the flesh."

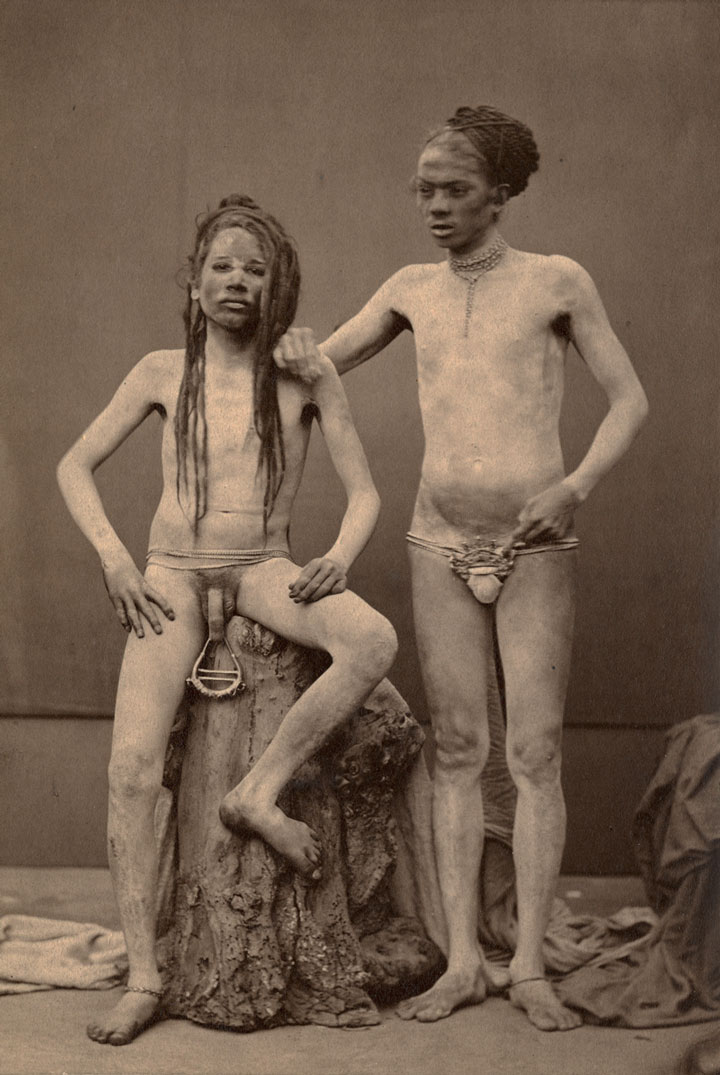
Indian Fakirs, one of them wearing a big piece of jewelry through an ampallang piercing, 1870–1880

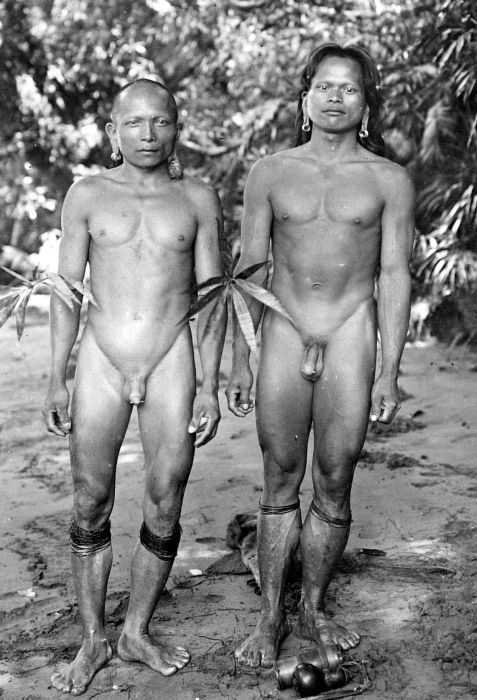
Two Kenyah-Dajaks, both with barbell-style studs in ampallang piercings – Borneo, 1920

The ampallang, a similar piercing (which also passes horizontally through the glans, but differs in that it is not attached to a ring), is found in different tribes throughout Sarawak and Sabah on the island of Borneo. Genital piercings became first introduced in western countries by ethnographic report, done by explorers such as in the 19th century. The Dutch explorer Anton Willem Nieuwenhuis described in his ethnographic record In Centraal Borneo: reis van Pontianak naar Samarinda – documenting his travel through Borneo in 1897 – the procedure of an ampallang piercing:

″The young men through the tattoo, because it is performed by them only to a limited extent, much less than women to suffer for it but they must in order to gain their full manhood, subject of another test, namely the through-hole the glans penis. This operation procedure is as follows: First, the glans made anemic by pressing between the two arms of a folded over strip of bamboo. At each of these arms are opposite each other where needed openings through which one after the round pressed glans become less sensitive to an acute kapfernen pin; formerly was used for this purpose a pointed bamboo sticks. The bamboo and the clamp is removed by means of a cord attached to pin left in the opening until the channel is healed. Later, the copper pin (utang) by another, usually through a tin, replaced, which is worn at all times, making only heavy work or strenuous operations of the metal pin a wooden square. Particularly brave men enjoy with the chief's prerogative to be allowed to wear the penis a ring in the scales of the pangolin cut and blunt teeth is occupied; sometimes they can also be crossed with the first channel, a second by the glans . Drill In addition to the Kayan themselves, engage in many Malays from the upper Kapuas this art. The pain during surgery do not seem to be very violent, and it has only rarely serious consequences, although until recovery can often take a month.″ – Anton Willem Nieuwenhuis

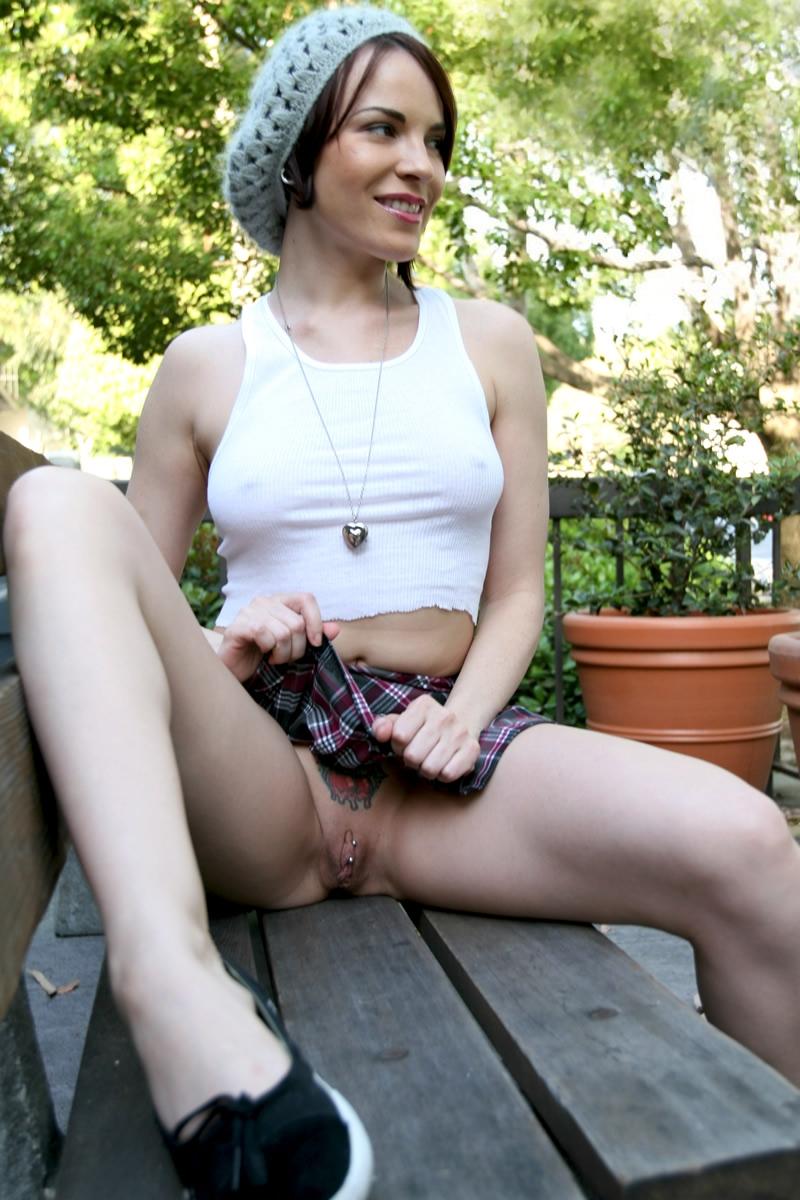
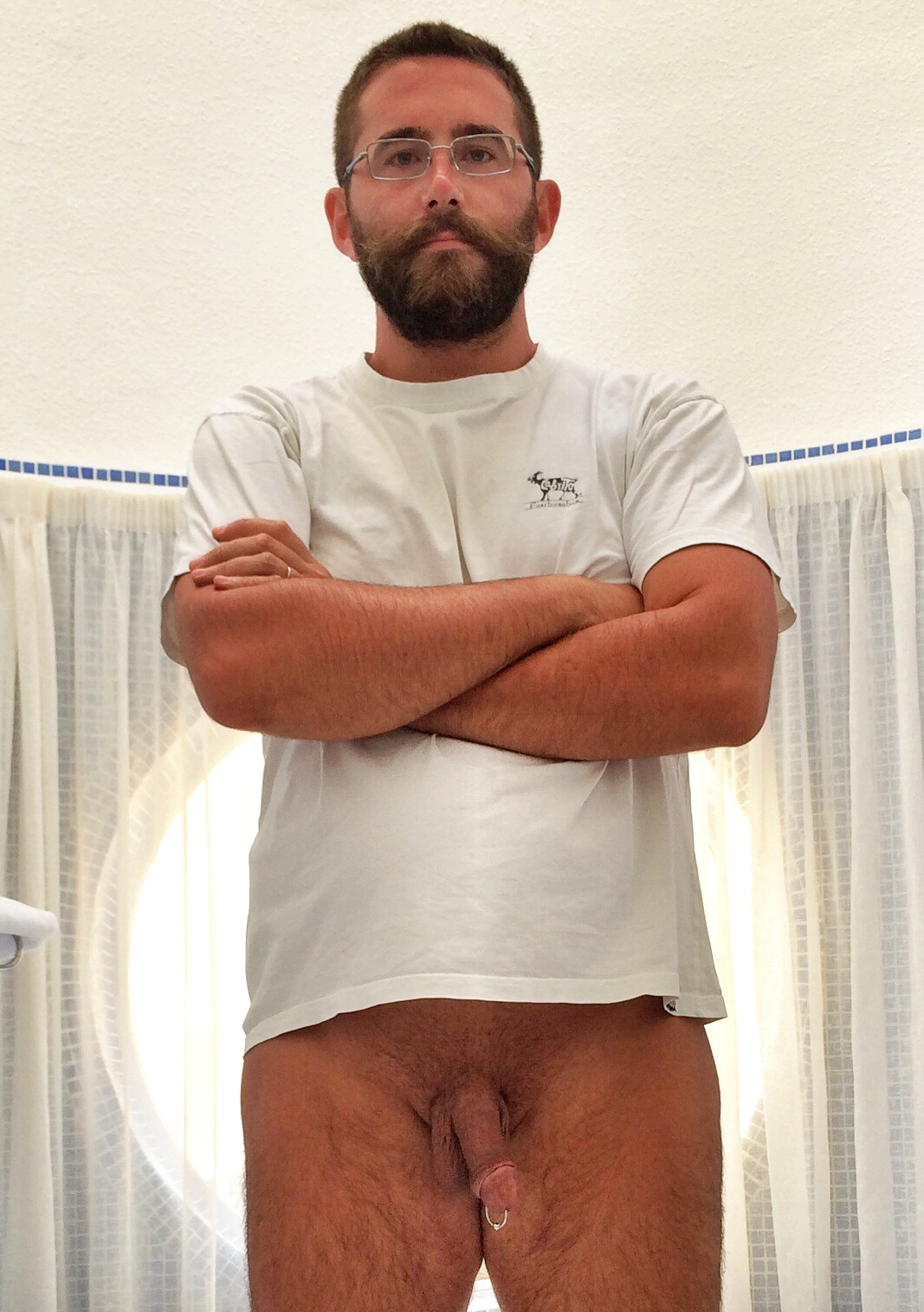
A woman with a vertical clitoral hood piercing and a man with a Prince Albert piercing. Genital piercings have become increasingly popular since the start of the 21st century.

Piercing the genitals became a short-lived trend at the end of the 19th century, in particular for upper classes of the society: "It was during the Victorian era that the practice of body piercing in the Western world reemerged. Many men and women of the Victorian royalty chose to receive nipple and genital piercings.″

Just like nipple piercings, genital piercings became increasingly more popular and part of mainstream culture in the second decade of the 21st century, with "nice and normal" people endorsing them. Many celebrities such as Christina Aguilera, Pete Doherty, Janet Jackson, Lenny Kravitz, Katarina Waters, or Pete Wentz, stated that they had or planned to have genital piercings. Genital piercings nowadays have a growing demand, especially in a young adult, college-aged population.

With regard to (female) genital piercings, Marilyn W. Edmunds, adjunct clinical professor at the Johns Hopkins University, stated, "Women with genital piercings are no longer on the social fringe or part of the 'punk' culture who are experimenting with behaviors that are 'socially provocative.' Over the past 30 years, genital piercing has become mainstream, and women engage in it for a variety of reasons."

== Motives ==
Like body piercings at large, genital piercings are often done for aesthetic reasons and as an expression of personal style. In addition, some (but not all) types of genital piercing increase sensitivity and provide additional stimulation during sexual activity. According to an Association of Professional Piercers report by Elayne Angel:

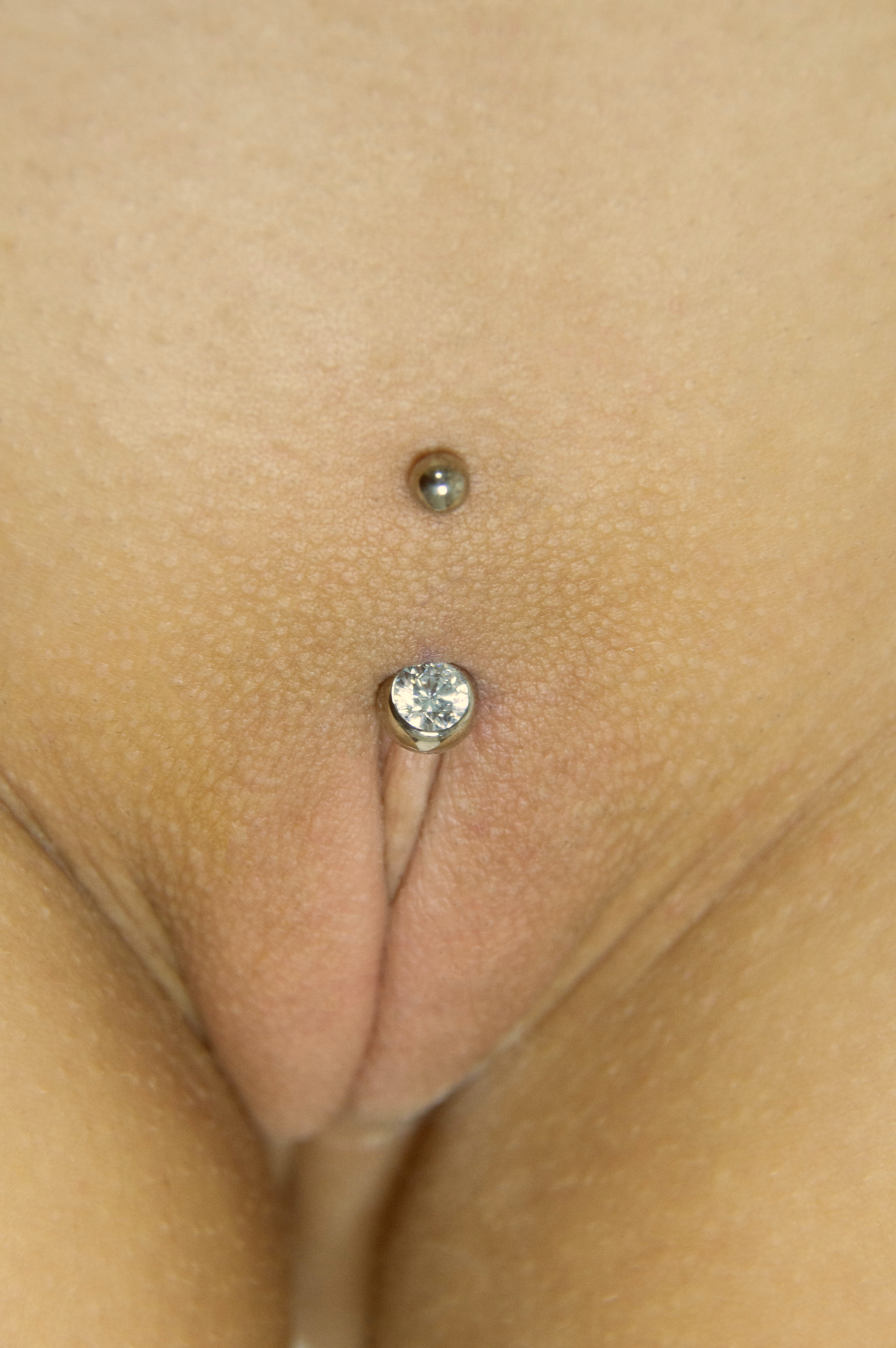
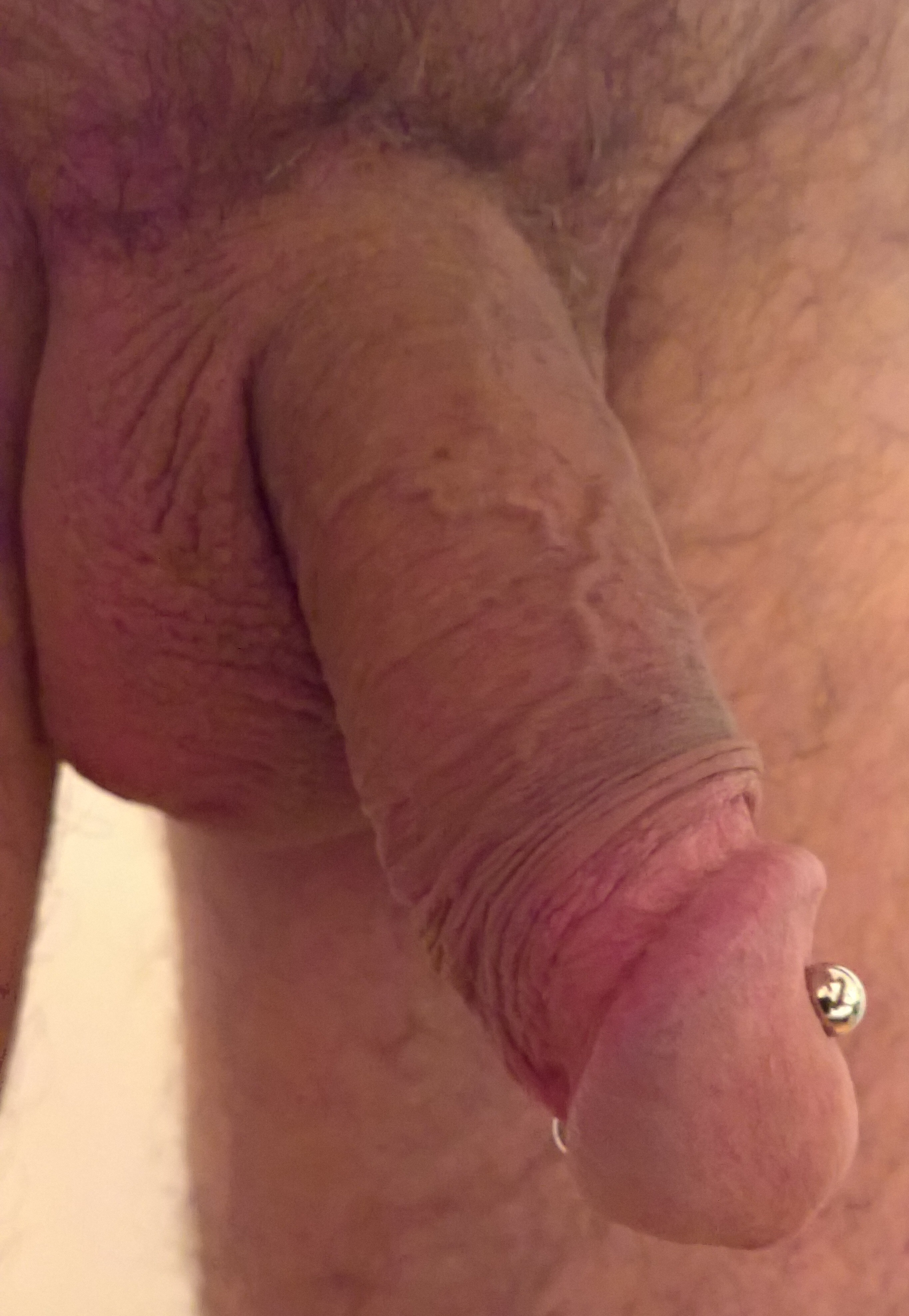
Left: Offering only minor added stimulation, the Christina piercing is primarily done for aesthetic reasons. Right: Beyond aesthetics, the apadravya can enhance sexual stimulation for both partners.

"Many adults are interested in genital piercing but aren't really sure which of the many options to select. They want to know which is the "best piercing" but there is no "one-piercing-fits-all" answer. It depends on many factors and highly individual desires and preferences (without even bringing individual anatomy in to the discussion yet). For some clients the most important aspect is that the piercing pleases their partner. Others have the priority of increasing their own sensation in a particular area or manner. Some want the one that will show the most, others to heal the fastest, yet others want one that is least likely to bleed! And on it goes. You will need to interview each client to determine the specific motivations and expectations for genital piercings. Inquire about which piercing(s) are of interest—and why? Is stimulation or aesthetics a primary motivation? Is the stimulation important more for the piercee, or does the piercee desire that sensation more for his/her partner? Then there are deeper specifics to probe (pardon the expression) such as whether the goal is increased sensation during penetration, or enhanced clitoral stimulation.[...]″
-– Elayne Angel

=== Culture and life style ===
==== Traditional cultures ====
In many traditional cultures, these piercings are done as a rite of passage during adolescence and, symbolically and literally, mark the admittance to the adult world and serve as a marker of cultural identity. Similar to religiously motivated circumcision, it may be regarded as a "purification of the flesh" and a common bodily sign to members of the same faith. These traditional meanings of modifying the body were revived in contemporary western society by the modern primitive. Inspired by ethnographic accounts of tribal practices, this subculture adopted genital piercings as a matter of individuation and spirituality.

==== Contemporary western society ====
For most people that seek genital piercings nowaday, a sense of uniqueness and non-conformism prevails. A 2015 study that evaluated a qualitative dataset of 484 self-reports and characteristics of men and women with genital piercings came to the conclusion that:

″Although in and of themselves, none of these findings necessarily indicates that genital piercings reinforce and validate traditional gender and sexual norms, collectively, our interpretation of these findings does seem to lean in that direction and, at minimum, provides little reason to believe that genital piercings offer any kind of resistance to these norms. Thus, while not automatically discounting the findings and arguments of prior research, we speculate that perhaps the social and cultural meanings of genital piercings have changed so that while at an earlier time, persons with genital piercings may have indeed perceived their piercings as being markers of resistance or as signs of individuality or of subcultural identity, today, genital piercings are, by and large, just another mainstream and fairly conventional type of body decoration and adornment. [...] Our research does appear consistent with the possibility that genital piercings are well on their way toward both popular and fashionable acceptance.″
– Jeremy N. Thomas, Professor of Sociology

=== Enhanced pleasure and sensation ===
Additionally, genital piercings can enhance sexual pleasure during masturbation, foreplay and intercourse.

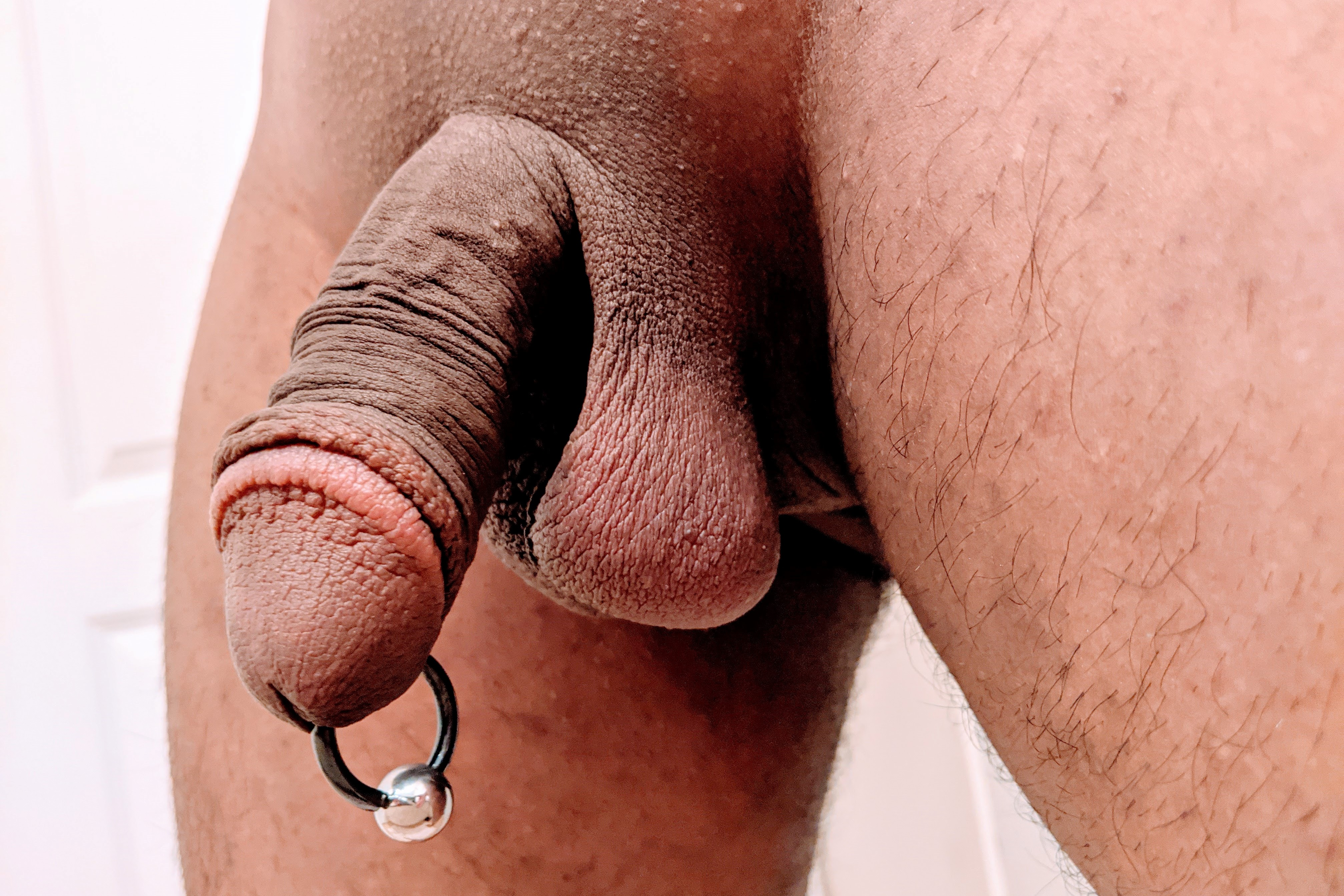
Prince Albert piercings are commonly used for enhanced sexual pleasure for both partners as well as for aesthetic reasons.

==== For the sexual partner ====
This effect is in particular reported for piercings passing through the glans penis: the ampallang and apadravya piercing. Women of the Dayak in Sarawak, Borneo prefer men with an ampallang, claiming that intercourse without would be dull:

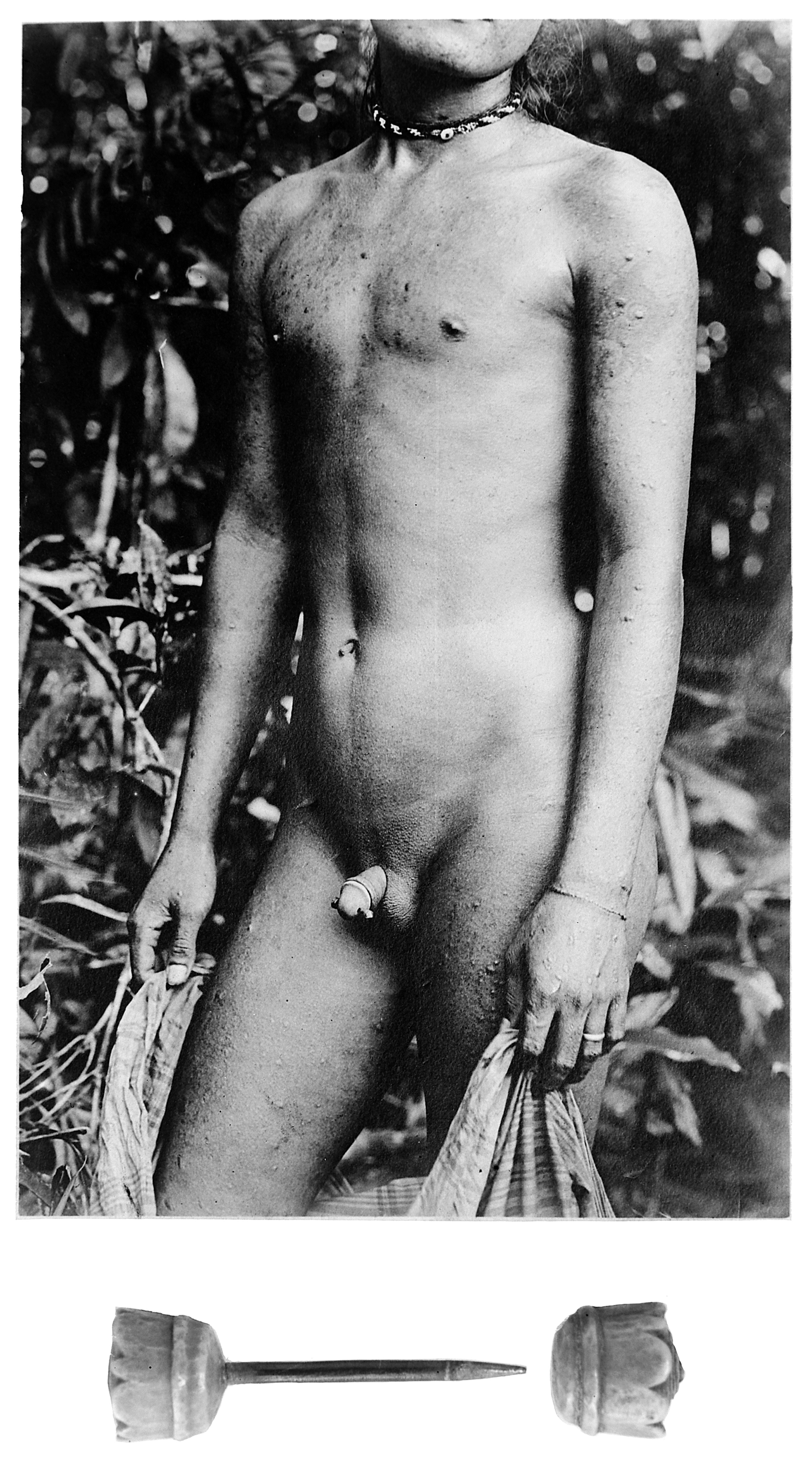
Historic photograph of a Dayak with ampallang piercing (top), detailed view of traditional jewelry (bottom)

Paolo Mantegazza stated, "The Dayak women have a right to insist upon the ampallang and if the man does not consent they may seek separation. They say that the embrace without this contrivance is plain rice; with it is rice with salt."

On another account by the anthropologist Tom Harrisson, who spent much of his life in Borneo and interviewed natives about the traditional ampallang; he stated, "the function of this device is, superficially, to add to the sexual pleasure of the women by stimulating and extending the inner walls of the vagina. It is, in this, in my experience, decidedly successful."

==== For the pierced person ====
For men, piercings that stimulate the sensitive urethra, either during masturbation or sexual intercourse, increase sensation.

Female genital piercings that are reported to enhance pleasure are the piercings that pass through or close to the clitoris, i.e. the clitoris piercing and the clitoral hood piercing. In an empirical study at the University of South Alabama, the authors reported a positive relationship between vertical clitoral hood piercings and desire, frequency of intercourse, and sexual arousal. However, this might depend on many factors such as placement, jewelry shape, and the individual. The triangle piercing is known to be quite pleasurable by providing stimulation of the underside of the clitoral glans, an area that is usually not stimulated at all.

== Potential health risks ==
Male genital piercing may increase the risk of STI transmission by making safer sex barriers (condoms) less effective. In two surveys, 5%–18% of men with genital piercings reported unspecified "problems using condoms" though it is unclear how many of these men used condoms regularly. There is no conclusive evidence that wearers of genital piercings are more likely to contract sexually transmitted infections.

== Legal considerations ==
Laws vary from one country to another, and sometimes within a country by legal jurisdiction. In many European countries, minors are required to bring a signed consent form from or to be escorted by a legal guardian. Even in countries that have no laws regulating genital piercing in minors, many piercers refrain from doing them (since physiological development is not completed in minors). In the United States, it is prohibited to pierce the genitals of people younger than 18 years.

== Types of genital piercings ==
=== Male genital piercings ===
Possible piercing sites on the male genitalia include the glans, the skin of the penis shaft, the scrotum or the perineum.

==== Glans penis ====
Piercings through the glans of the penis include the ampallang, which passes horizontally, and the apadravya, that passes vertically through the glans. The Prince Albert piercing is situated on the ventral side (underside) of the penis immediately behind the glans, while the reverse Prince Albert piercing passes through the dorsal (top) side of the glans. The dydoe pierces through the coronal rim of the glans. With the exception of the dydoe, all these piercings traditionally pass through the urethra.

These piercings provide increased stimulation during intercourse to the male (who is carrying the piercing) as well as to the partner. Piercings through the head, or the glans, are the genital piercings with the best-documented historical evidence.

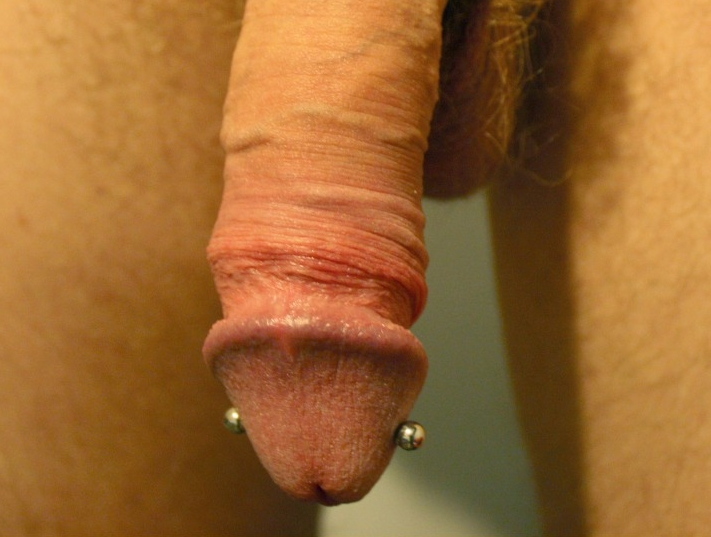
Ampallang

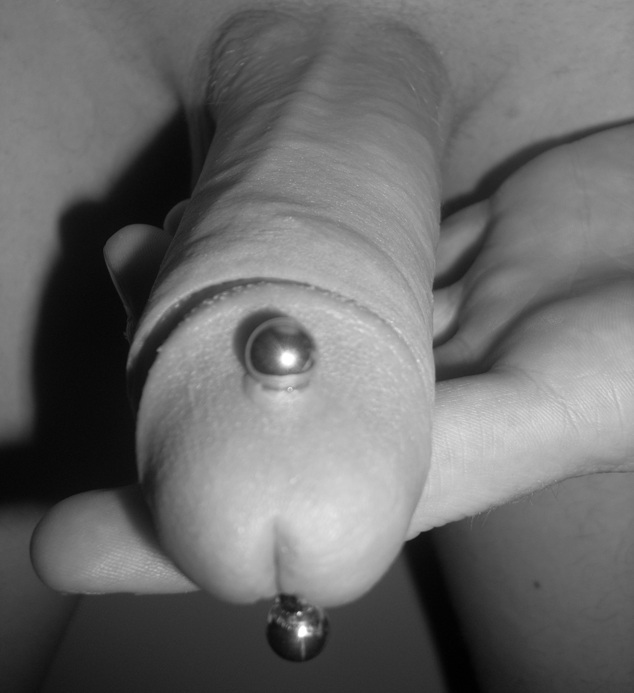
Apadravya

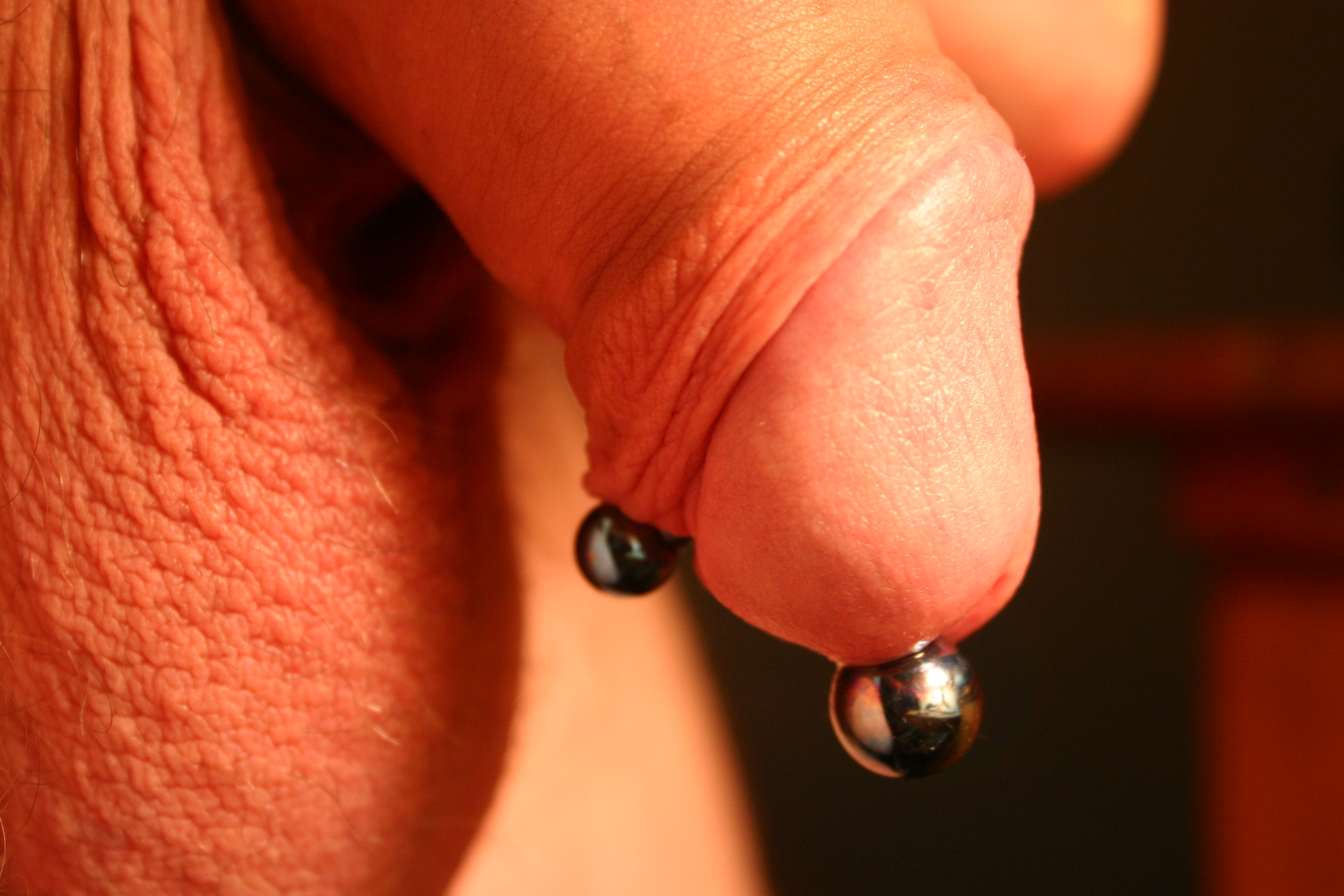
Prince Albert

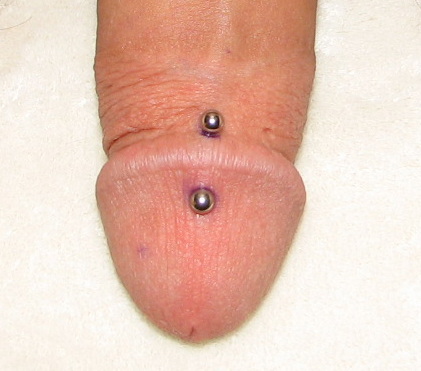
Dydoe piercing

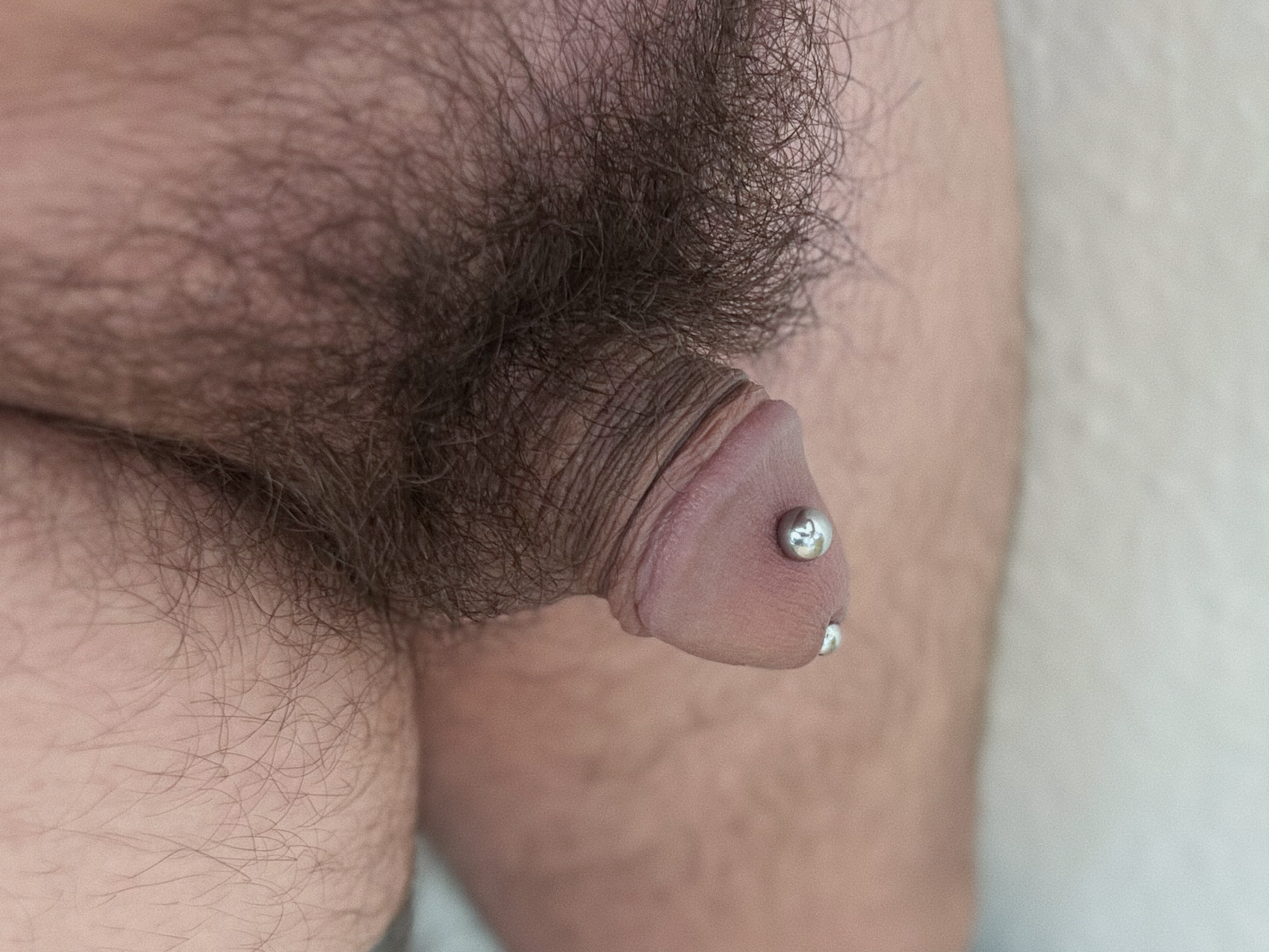
Reverse Prince Albert piercing

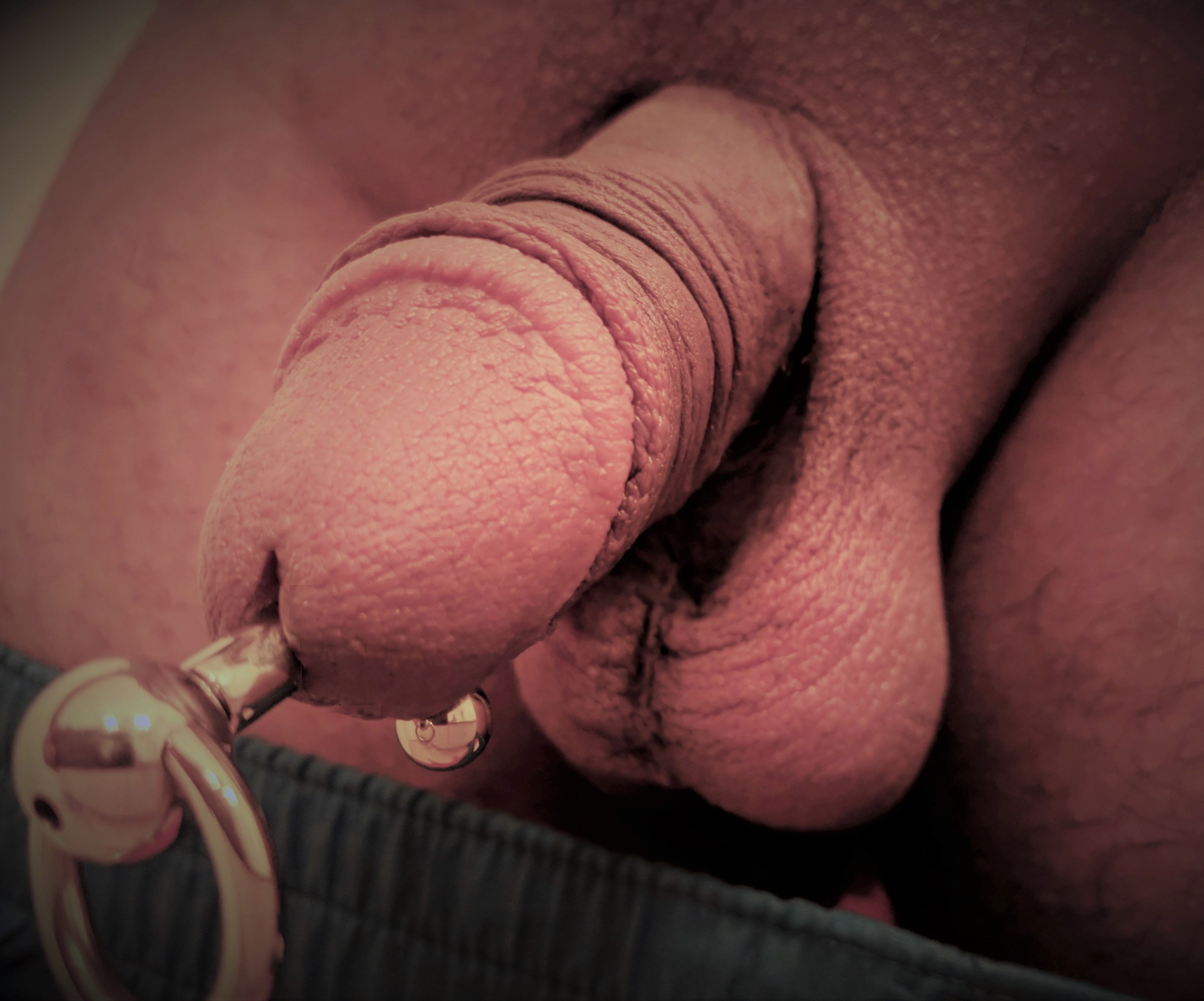
Prince's wand

==== Skin of the penis shaft and scrotum ====
Foreskin piercing passes through the penile prepuce on the dorsal, ventral or lateral side. The frenum piercing passes through the penile frenum, a small skin bridge that connects the glans with the shaft skin. The hafada piercing is situated on the skin of the scrotum while a transscrotal piercing travels through it. As an intermediate version between frenulum and hafada, the lorum piercing (low frenum) sits at the point where penis and scrotum connect. The Jacob's Ladder is a ladder from frenum to scrotum. The guiche piercing is a body piercing on the perineum.

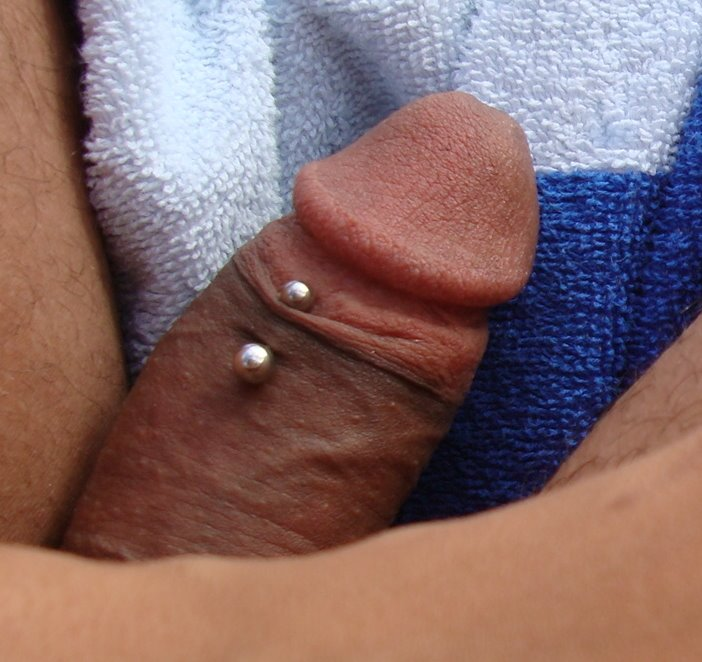
Foreskin piercing

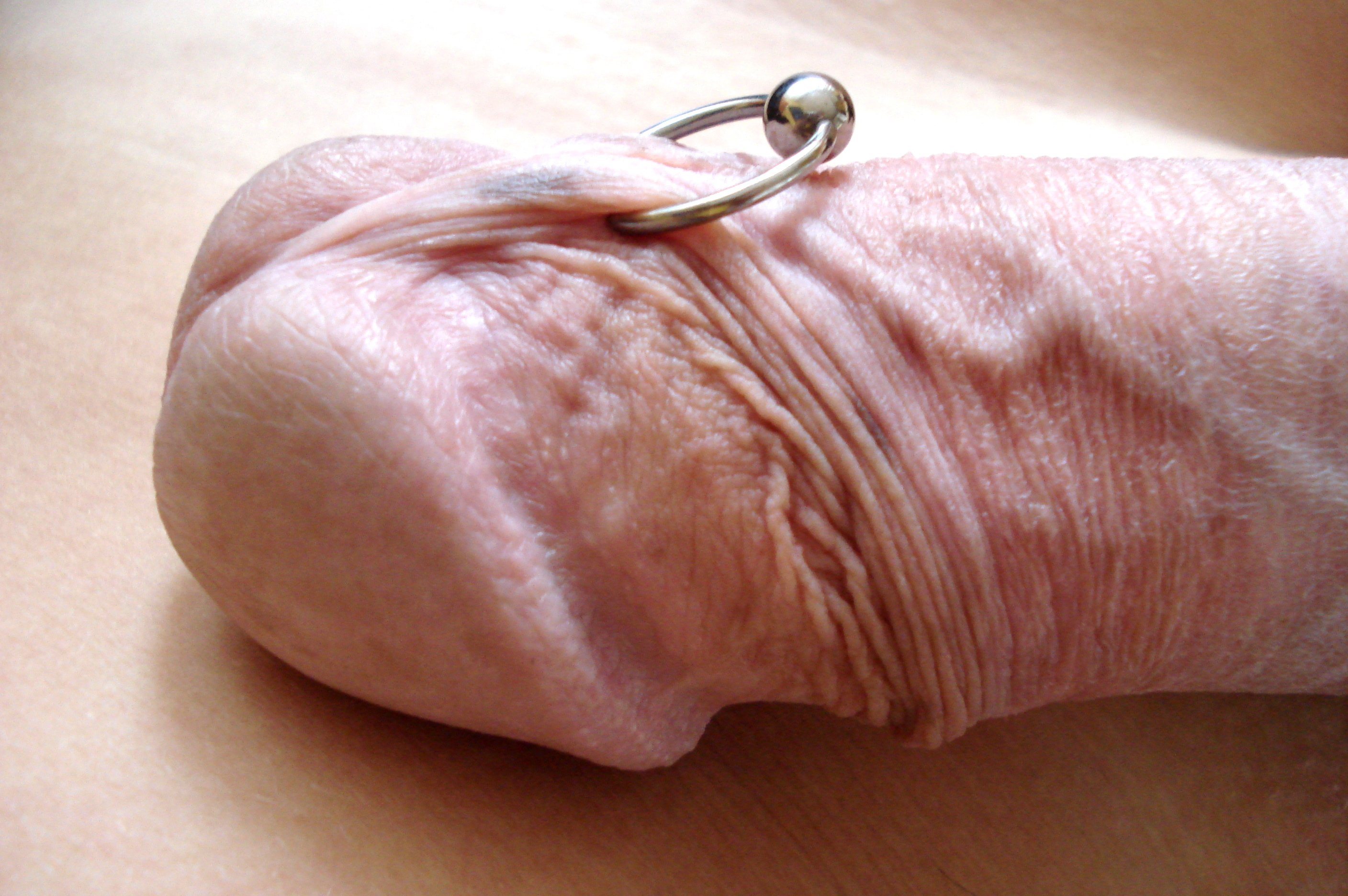
Frenum piercing

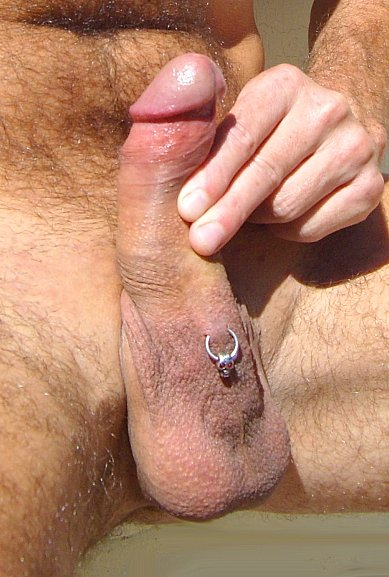
Lorum piercing

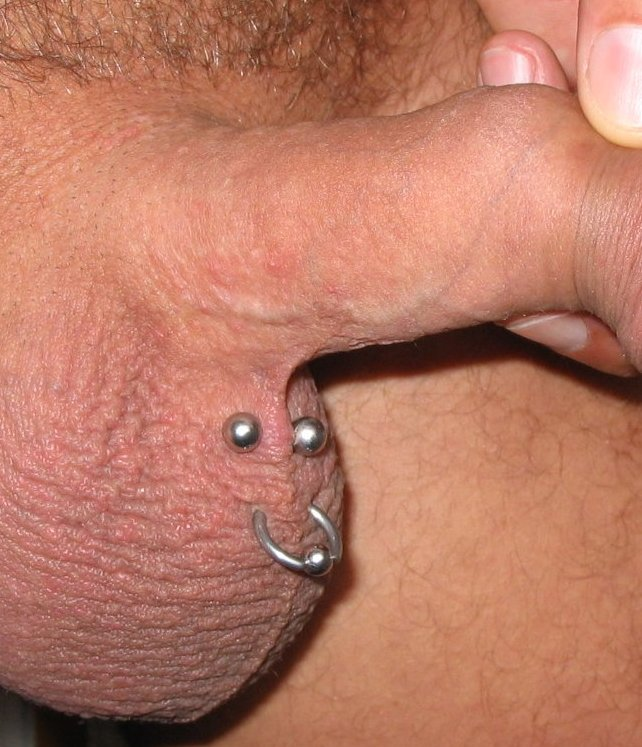
Hafada piercing

=== Female genital piercings ===
In female individuals as well, various anatomical parts can be suitable for piercings. These include the mons pubis, the clitoral hood, the outer, inner labia and the vulval vestibule (which is the area surrounding the vaginal opening).

==== Clitoris and clitoral hood ====
The glans of the clitoris itself can be pierced. Since this anatomical part is too small in many cases and is susceptible to nerve damage, this piercing is not very common. In contrast, the clitoral hood piercing is the most common genital piercing for women. It can be applied horizontally and vertically. The deep hood piercing is a variation of the clitoral hood piercing that pass deeper through the clitoral hood. The Isabella piercing passes vertically through the clitoral shaft and is rather complicated to pierce.

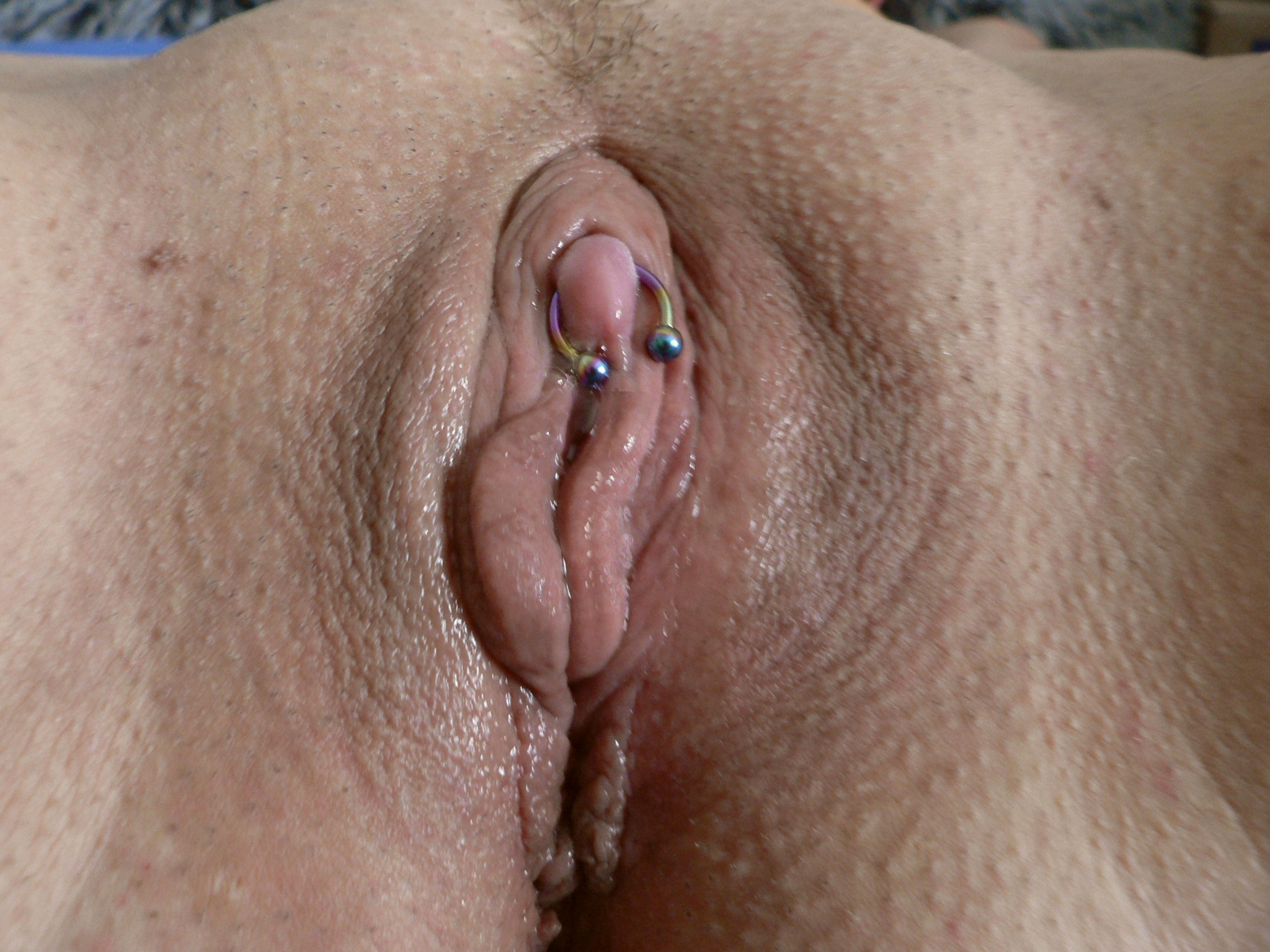
Clitoris piercing

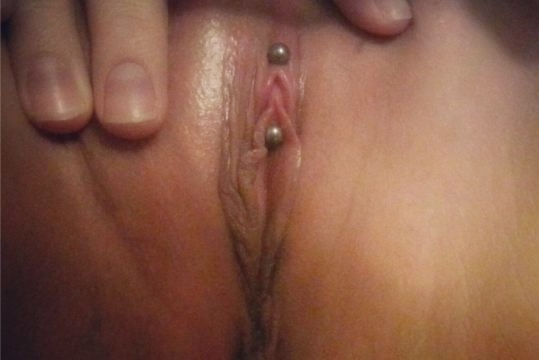
Isabella piercing

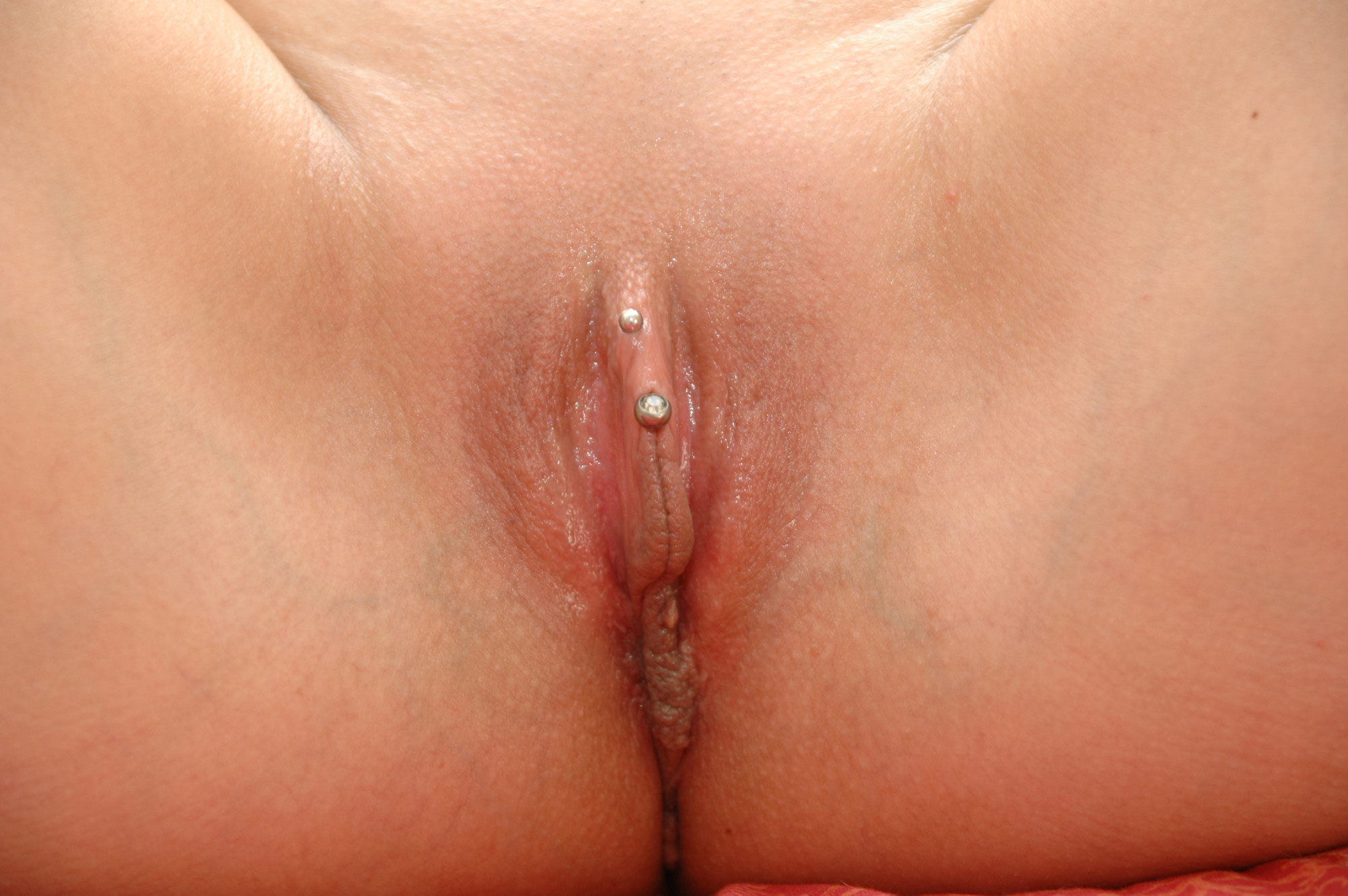
Vertical clitoral hood piercing (VCH)

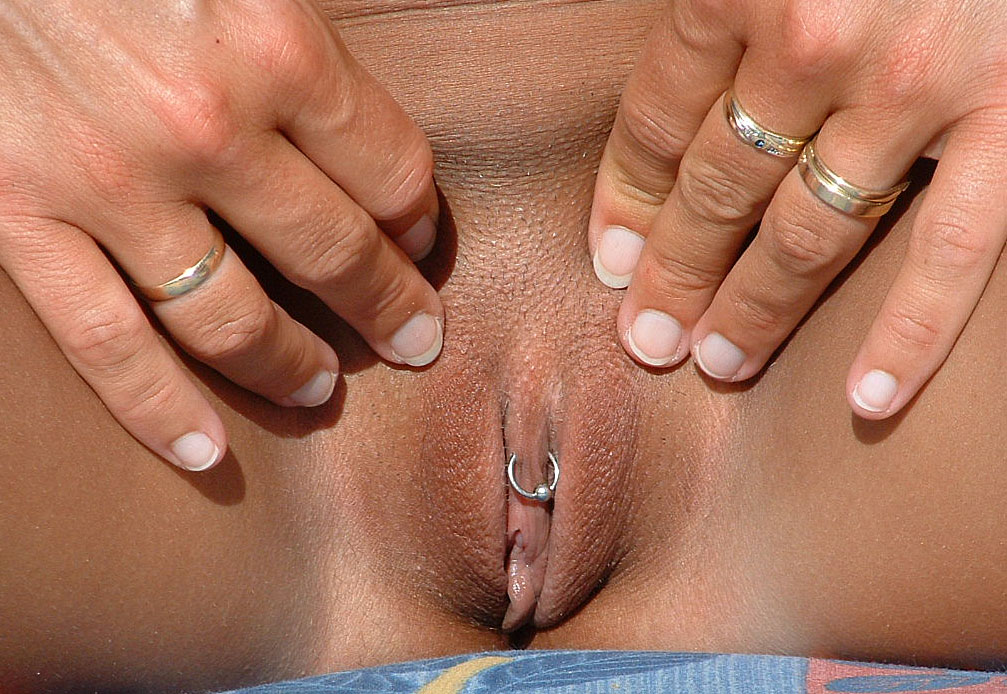
Horizontal clitoral hood piercing (HCH)

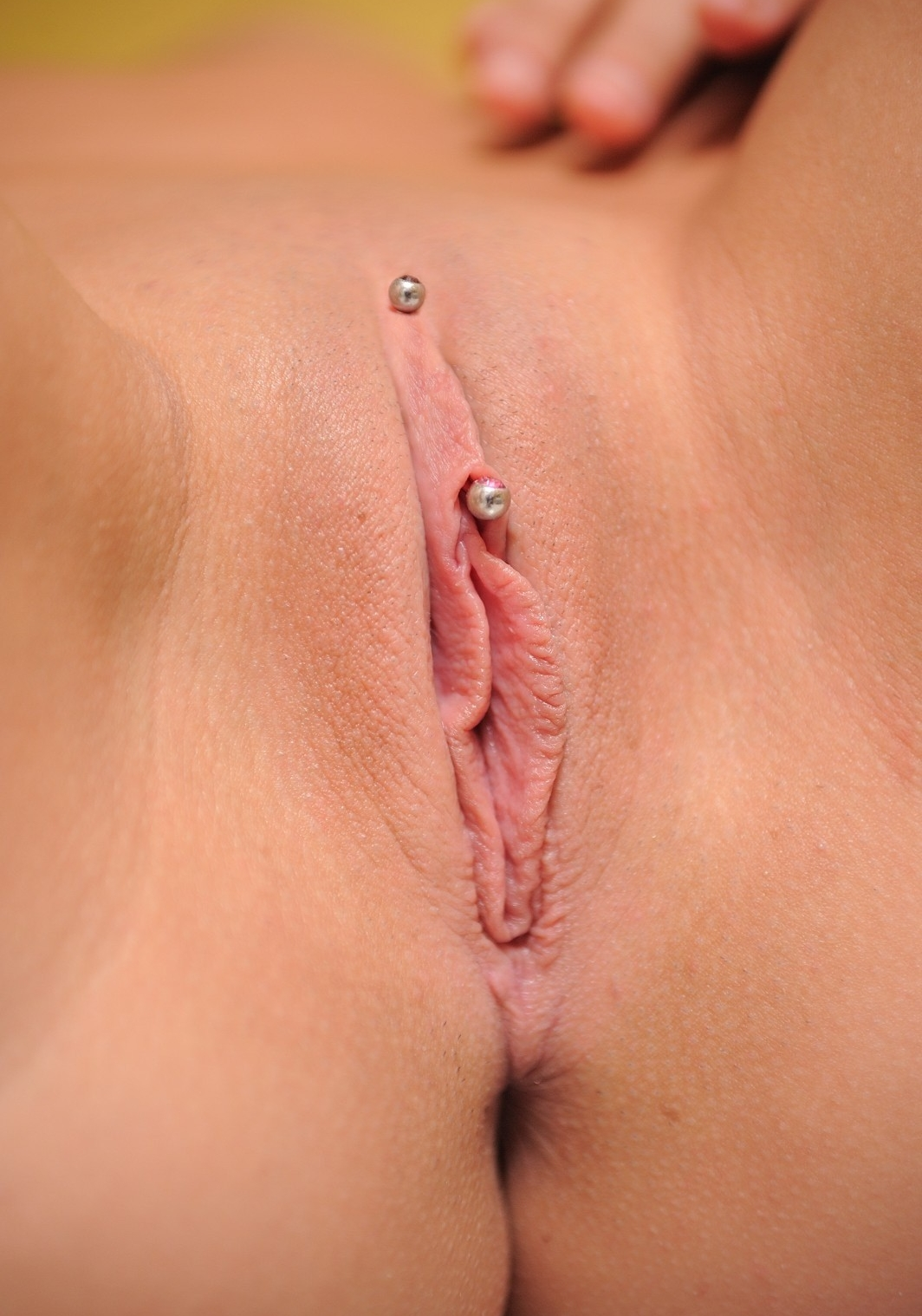
Deep hood piercing

==== Labia and vulval vestibule ====
Labia piercing can be applied to the labia majora or the labia minora. The triangle piercing is located at the ventral end of the labia minora, at the point of transition between labia and clitoral hood. It runs horizontally, partly under the clitoral shaft. The fourchette piercing passes through the dorsal rim of the vulval vestibule. A less common version of the fourchette piercing is the suitcase piercing which can be considered as a deeper version of the fourchette because it enters through the perineum. Also rather uncommon is the Princess Albertina piercing, the female version of the Prince Albert piercing, that passes through the ventral (lower) wall of the urethra.

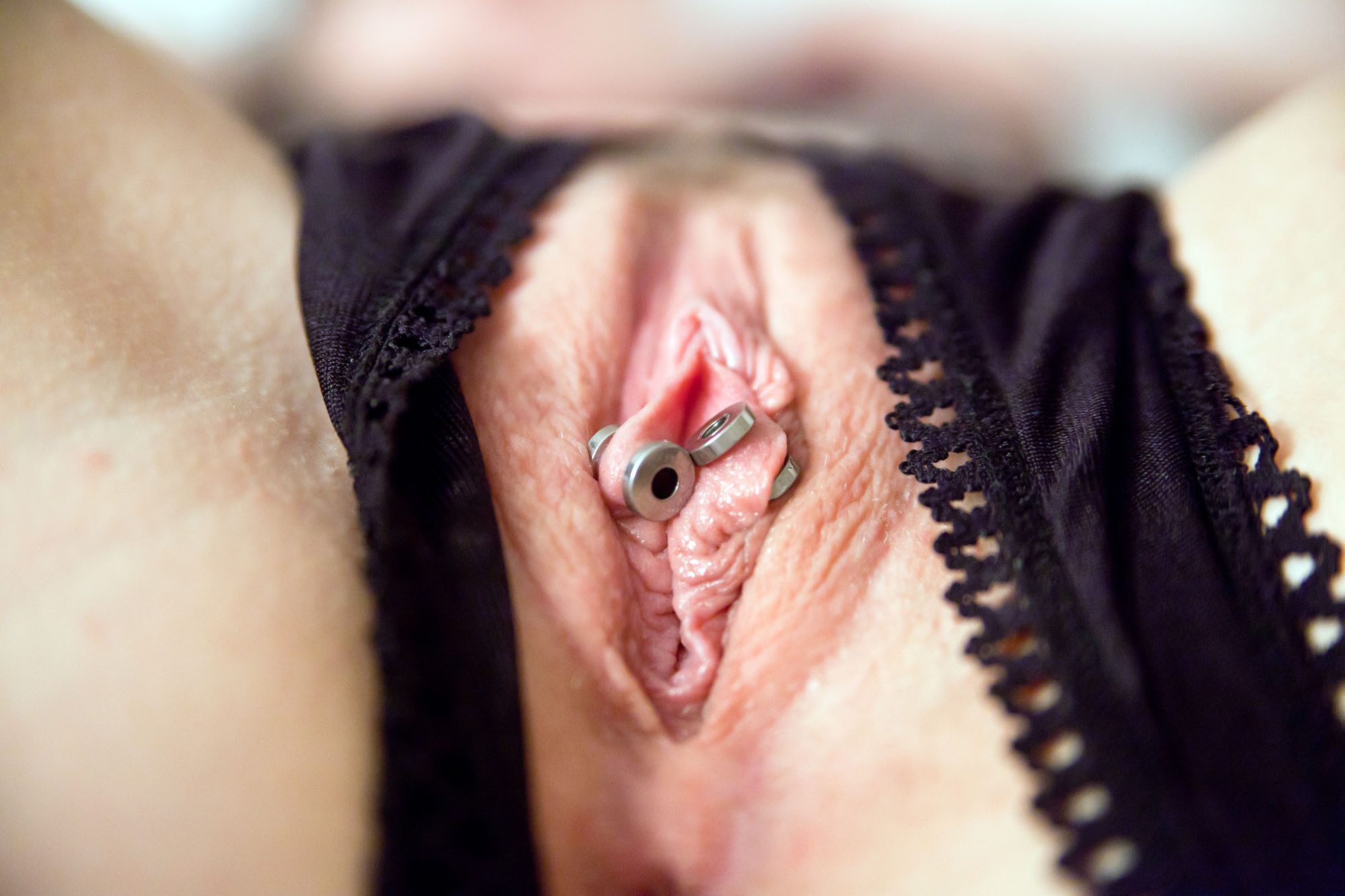
Inner labia piercing

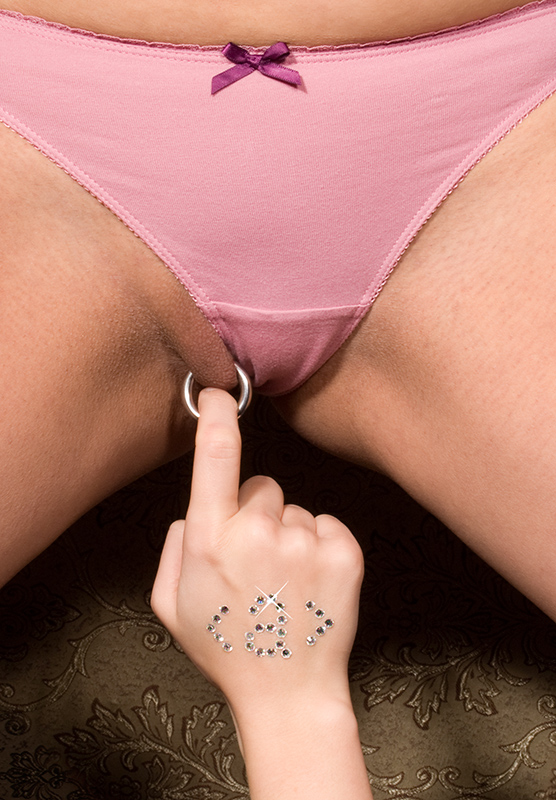
Outer labia piercing

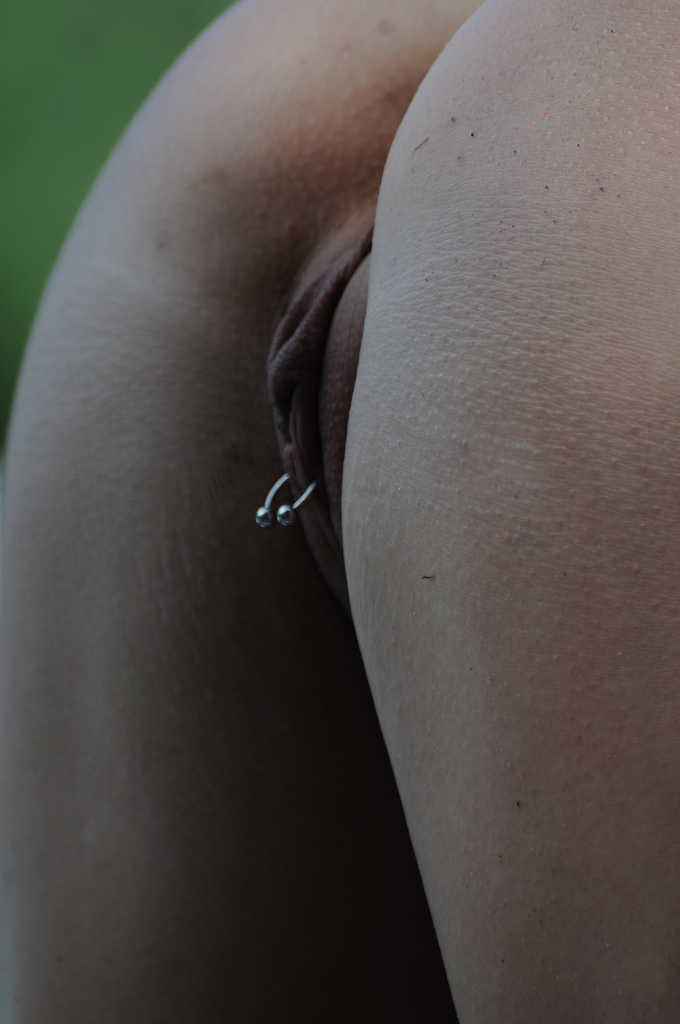
Triangle piercing

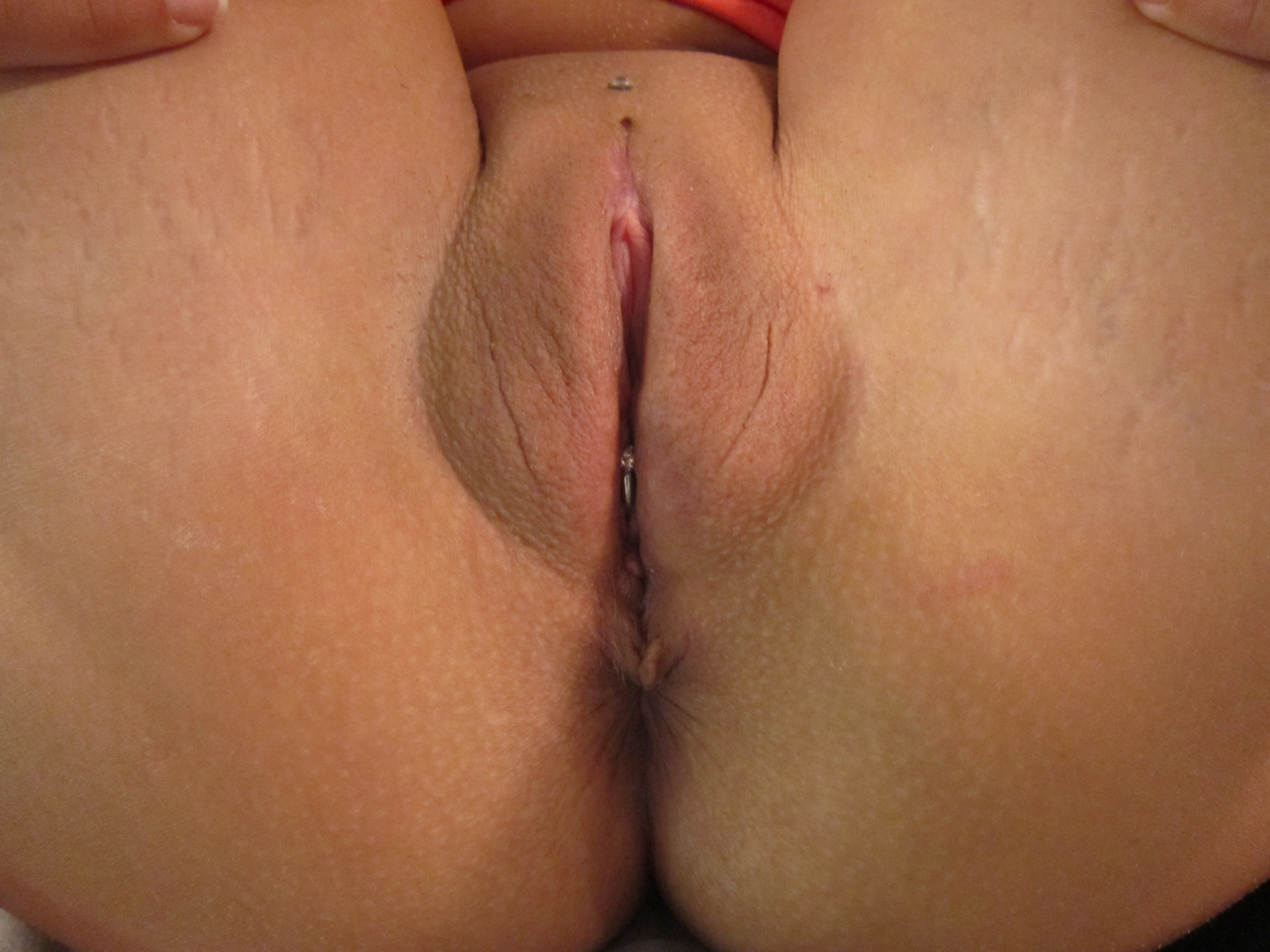
Princess Albertina piercing

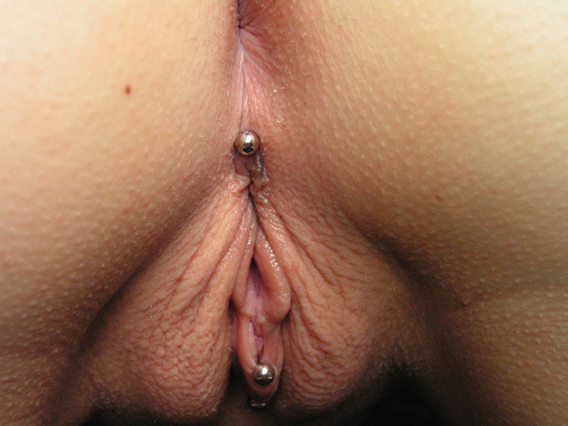
Fourchette piercing

==== Mons pubis ====
The Christina piercing is a surface piercing, situated on the upper part of the mons pubis where the outer labia meet. It is similar to the Nefertiti piercing, that can be seen as a combination between vertical clitoral hood piercing and Christina piercing.

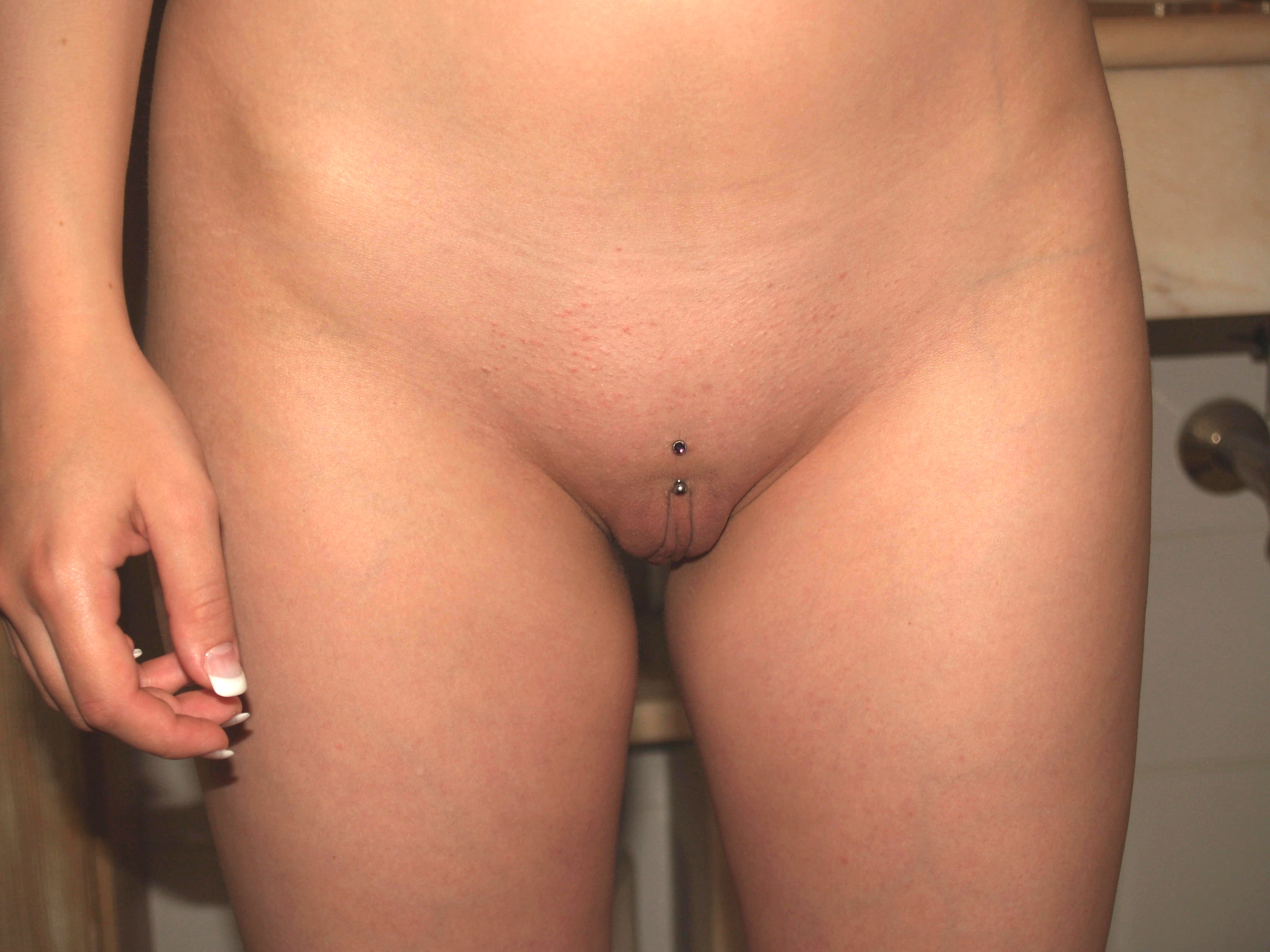
Christina piercing

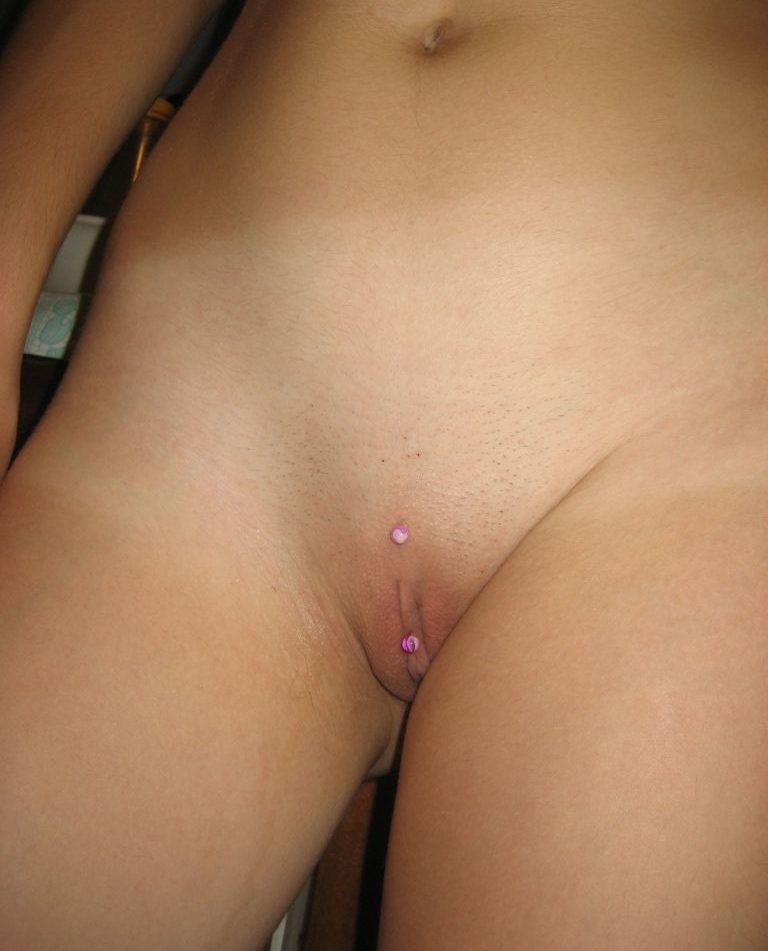
Nefertiti piercing

=== Unisex genital piercings ===
Body piercings that do not involve perforation of genitalia but referred to as "genital piercings" by convention can be worn by both males and females. These include the pubic piercing, which is situated above the penis in males and on the mons pubis in females (comparable to the Christina piercing, but horizontally). The guiche piercing passes horizontally through the perineum while the anal piercing passes through the anus.

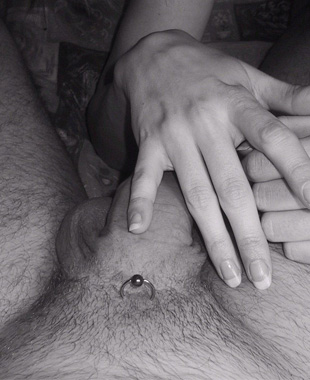
Pubic piercing

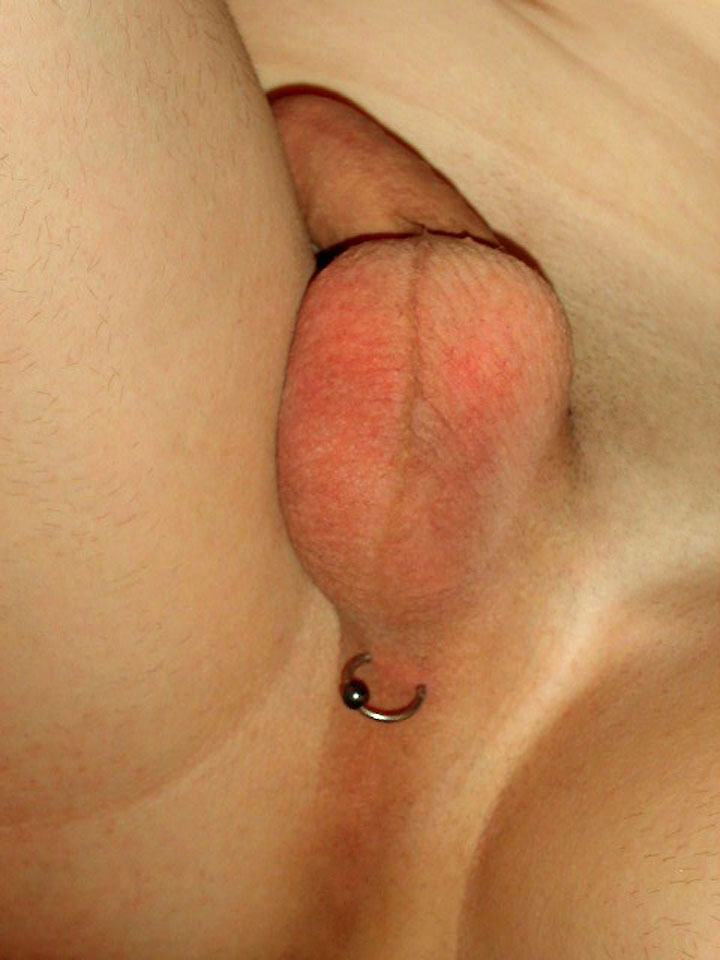
Guiche piercing

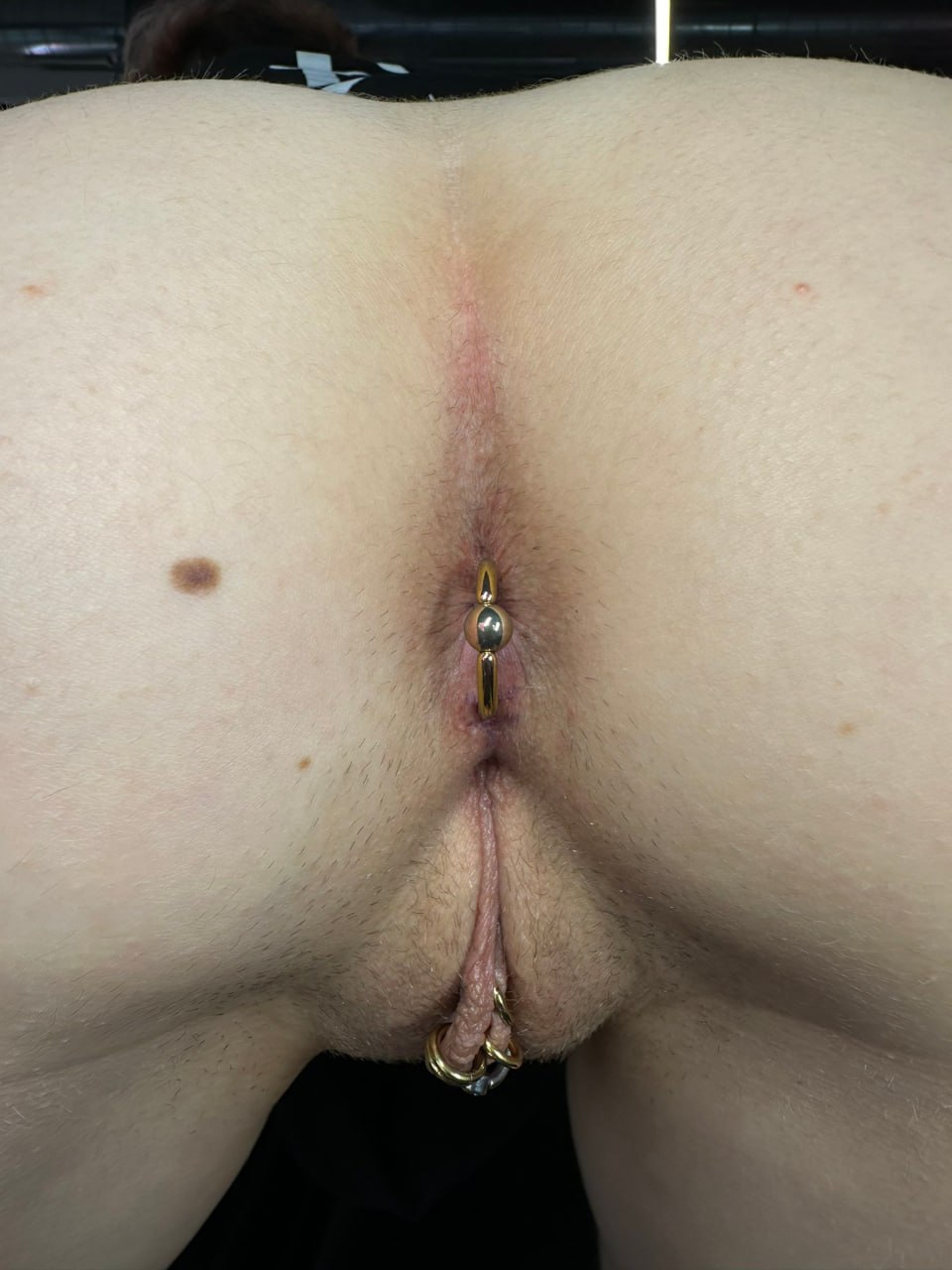
Anal piercing

== See also ==
- Bikini waxing
- Body piercing jewelry
- Chastity piercing
- Cock ring
- Genital modification and mutilation
- Genital tattooing
- Nipple piercing
- Play piercing
- Pubic piercing
- Transdermal implant
- Vajazzle
