= Fourchette =

Fourchette can refer to:

- fr:Fourchette, the French word for fork
- In English, a technical term for
  - a type of dessert fork
  - a component of a glove
- In female human anatomy, the frenulum labiorum pudendi
  - Fourchette piercing

Fourchette supermarket
