= Triangle piercing =

Genital piercing

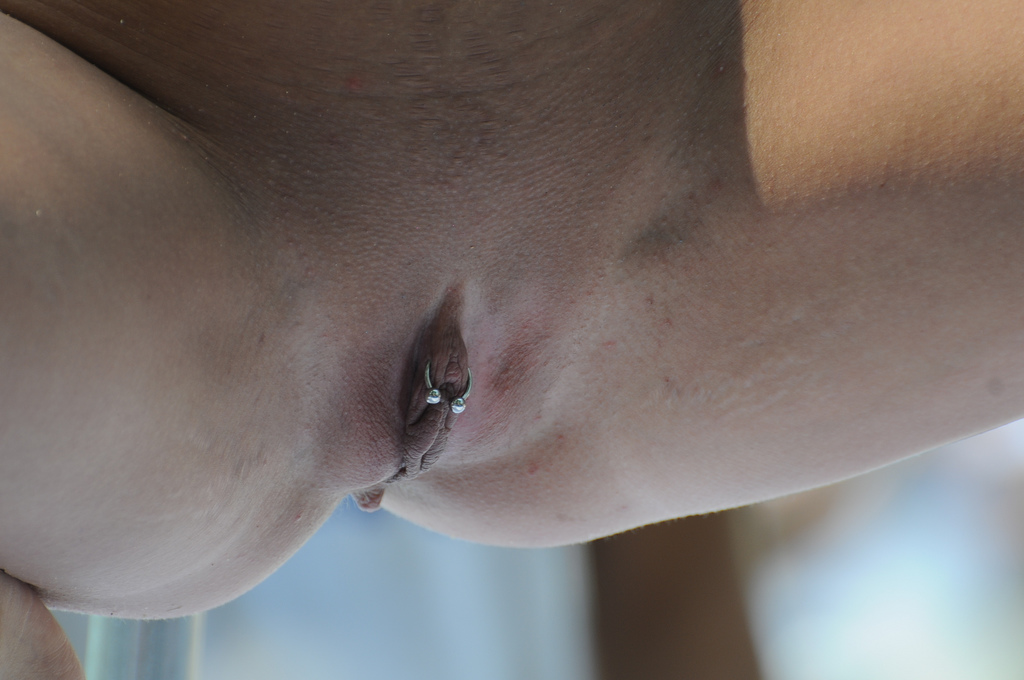
- Location: Base of clitoral hood
- Jewelry: Barbell
- Healing: 12–18 weeks

A triangle piercing is one of several forms of genital piercing applied to the vulva. It is a horizontal piercing that passes from side to side, beneath the base of the clitoral hood tissue where it meets the inner labia and under the clitoris. The name is derived from the tissue where the labia meets the clitoral hood, which looks like a triangle when pinched.

Unlike the vertical clitoral hood piercing which stimulates the clitoris from the front, the triangle piercing can stimulate it from behind, the only genital piercing to do so, although it does not pass through the clitoris or the clitoral shaft. The usual jewellery worn with the piercing is a barbell.

There are a number of anatomical requirements with regard to the vulva. For instance, the clitoral hood has to protrude outwards from the body for sufficient distance. Most vulvas are not suited to the piercing. For individuals where it is suitable, the location of the piercing needs significant precision to prevent it being misplaced. If it is too far back it will not stimulate the clitoris, while if it is too far forward it may penetrate the clitoral body causing pain and damage to the vulva.

According to PFIQ magazine, the first triangle piercing was performed by Lou Duff of the Gauntlet body piercing studio in the early 1990s. It was subsequently developed by Elayne Angel.
