= Reverse Prince Albert piercing =

Type of male genital piercing

Reverse Prince Albert
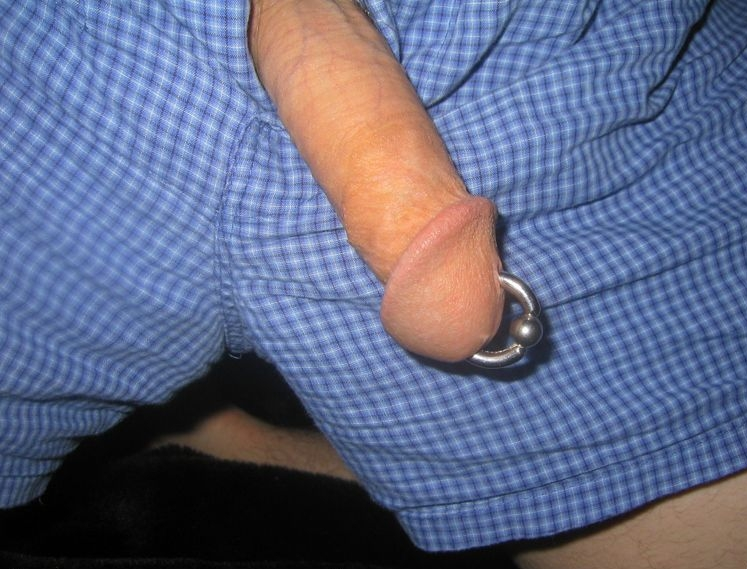
- Reverse Prince Albert piercing
- Nicknames: RPA
- Location: Urethra
- Jewelry: CBR
- Healing: 3 months

Reversed Prince Albert + Ampallang Piercing

The Reverse Prince Albert piercing (RPA) is a form of male genital piercing.

== Characteristics ==
The reverse Prince Albert piercing enters through the urethra and exits through a hole pierced in the top of the glans.

== See also ==
- Prince Albert (genital piercing)
- Genital piercing
