= Ampallang =

Male genital piercing

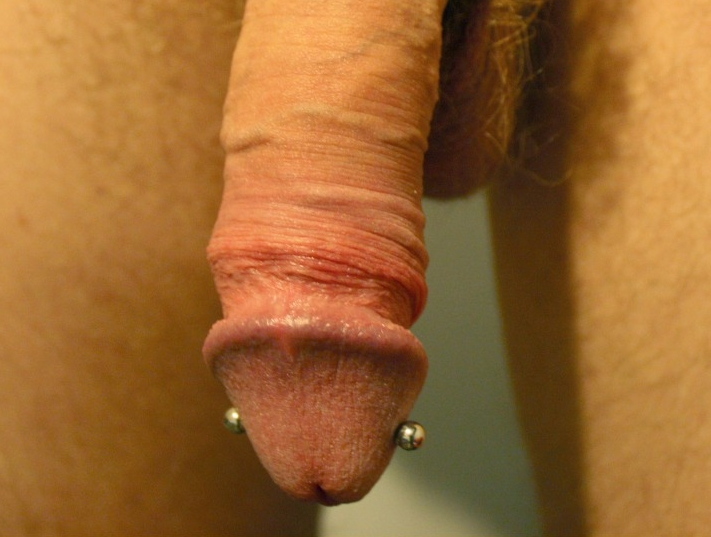
- Location: Glans
- Jewelry: Straight barbell

The palang (Iban: crossbar) or ampallang is a male genital piercing that penetrates horizontally through the entire glans of the penis.

== History ==
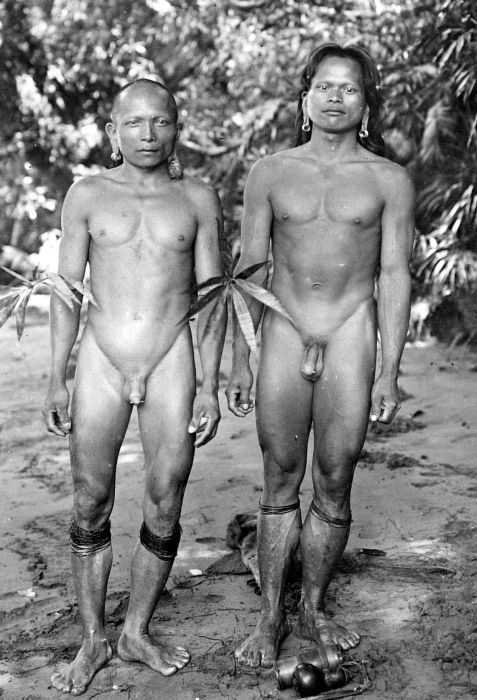
Two Dayak Kenyah men, ca. 1920, wearing ampallang. Photo collection of the Tropenmuseum.

Penis piercings of proto-Malay origin predated European contact with the peoples of Maritime Southeast Asia, including tribes in the Philippines, and in Borneo's Dayak people, among others. Thomas Cavendish claimed in a 16th century work that use in the Philippines was invented by the women to prevent sodomy (where that variant included a spur).

== Types ==
The titular piercing may be transurethral (passing through the urethra), which is termed the European ampallang; the American ampallang is placed horizontally above the urethra, generally back toward the corona. A variant on this piercing is the deep shaft piercing, or "shaft ampallang", which penetrates the shaft of the penis horizontally at any point along its length. The counterpart to this piercing is the apadravya, which penetrates the glans vertically. The combination of an ampallang and an apadravya is sometimes referred to as the magic cross.
