= Apadravya =

Penis piercing

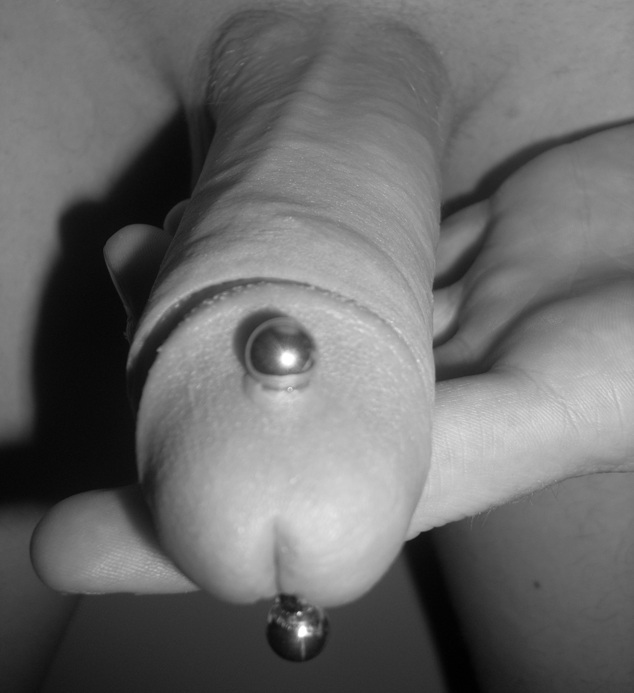
- Location: Glans penis
- Jewelry: Straight barbell

The apadravya, like the ampallang, is a genital piercing that passes through the glans penis. While the ampallang passes horizontally through the glans, the apadravya passes vertically through the glans from top to bottom, almost always placed centrally and passing through the urethra. It can be paired with an ampallang to form the magic cross. Off-center apadravyas are also possible, wherein the piercing is deliberately offset, yet these usually still pass through the urethra. The piercing is often done at a slightly forward angle.

== Terminology ==
Apadravya (Sanskrit: अपद्रव्य) is the generic name used in Kama Sutra for prostheses to increase the size of penis during intercourse, primarily to satisfy a woman classified as hastini (हस्तिनी, 'she-elephant'). Fixing an apadravya by perforating the lingam is mentioned as a peculiarity of the "southern countries." Such definition is supposedly illustrative of a palang ("crossbar" in Iban) and other penis inserts of proto-Malay origins. Indeed, traditional palang design is simply a pin used to accommodate a wooden glans cape extension and, hence, the term apadravya in this context refers to the glans cape extension and not to the palang itself. Nevertheless, it was Doug Malloy in the 1970s who labelled the vertical glans piercing as "apadravya" and the horizontal one as "ampallang".

== Variations ==
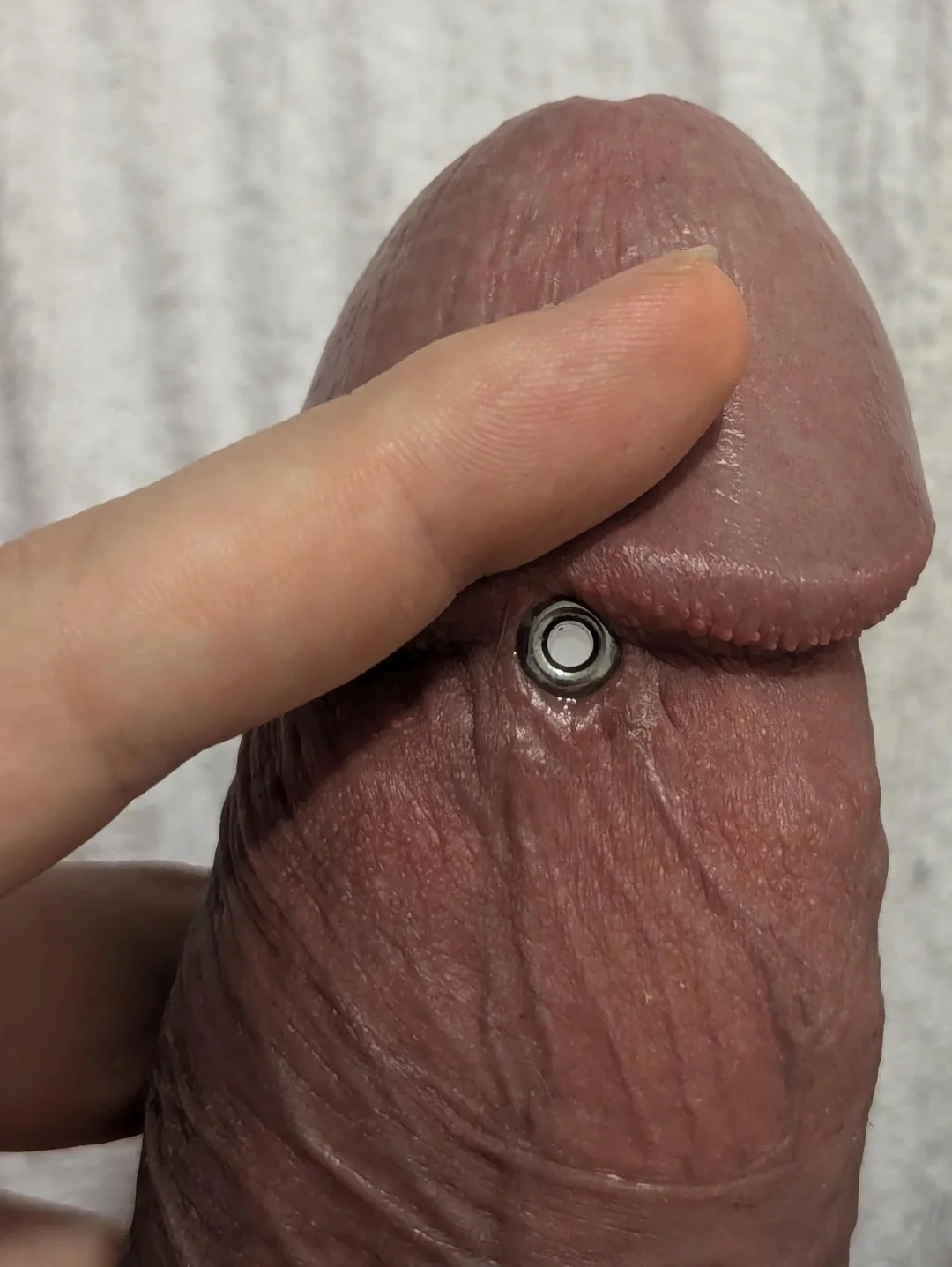
Shaft apadravya with 3 gauge flesh tunnel

Variations include the shaft apadravya, which pierces the shaft (uncommon, and not performed by many piercers); the magic cross, which is a combination of the apadravya and the ampallang; and the apadydoe. If the penis has been subincised or meatotomized, the piercing is called a halfadravya.
