= Dydoe =

Genital piercing

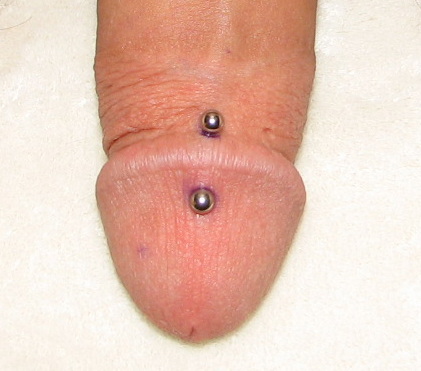
- Location: Glans
- Jewelry: Barbell
- Healing: 4 to 6 months

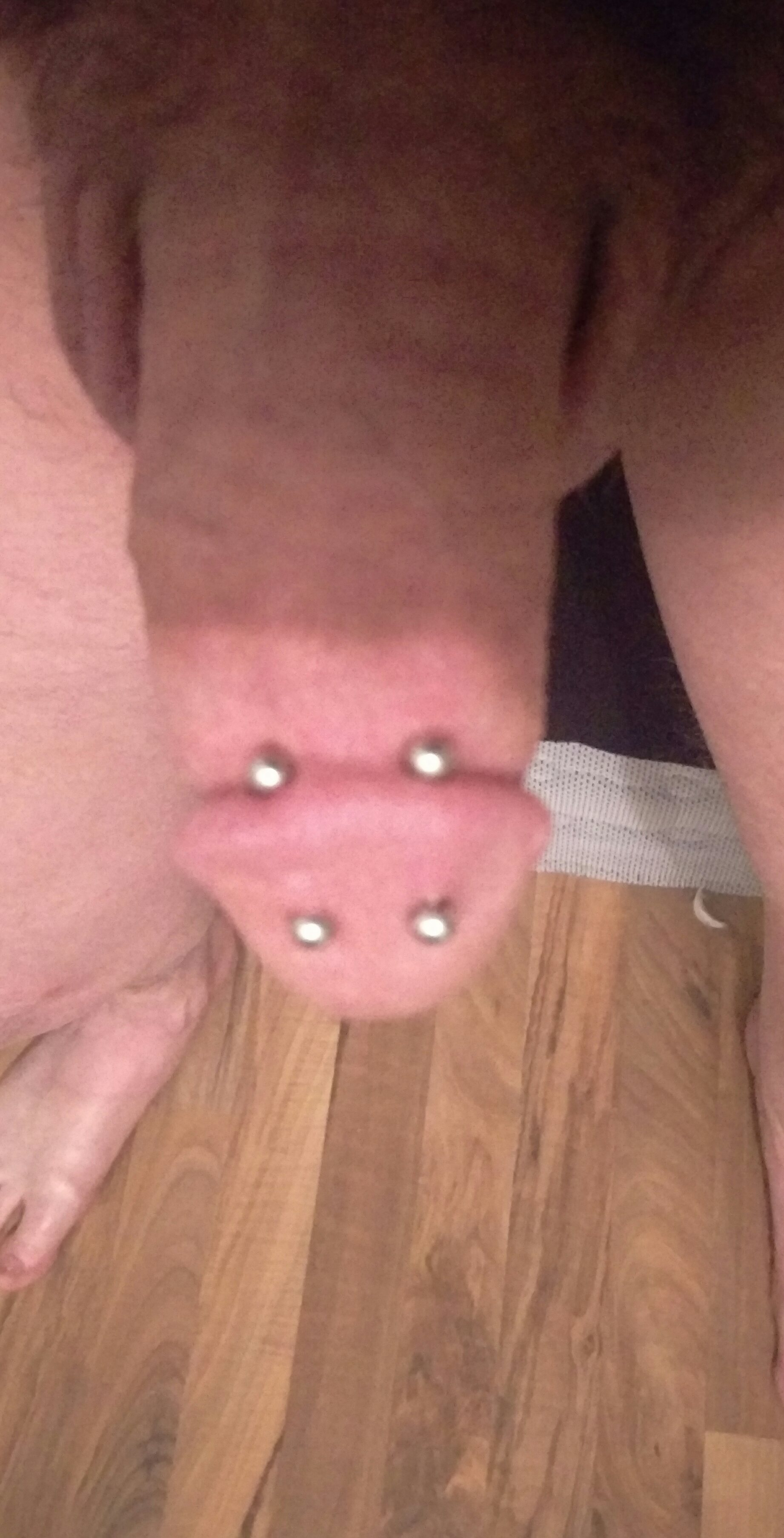
Recently pierced double dydoe

A dydoe is a type of male genital piercing that passes through the ridge of the glans on the head of the penis. They are often done in pairs.

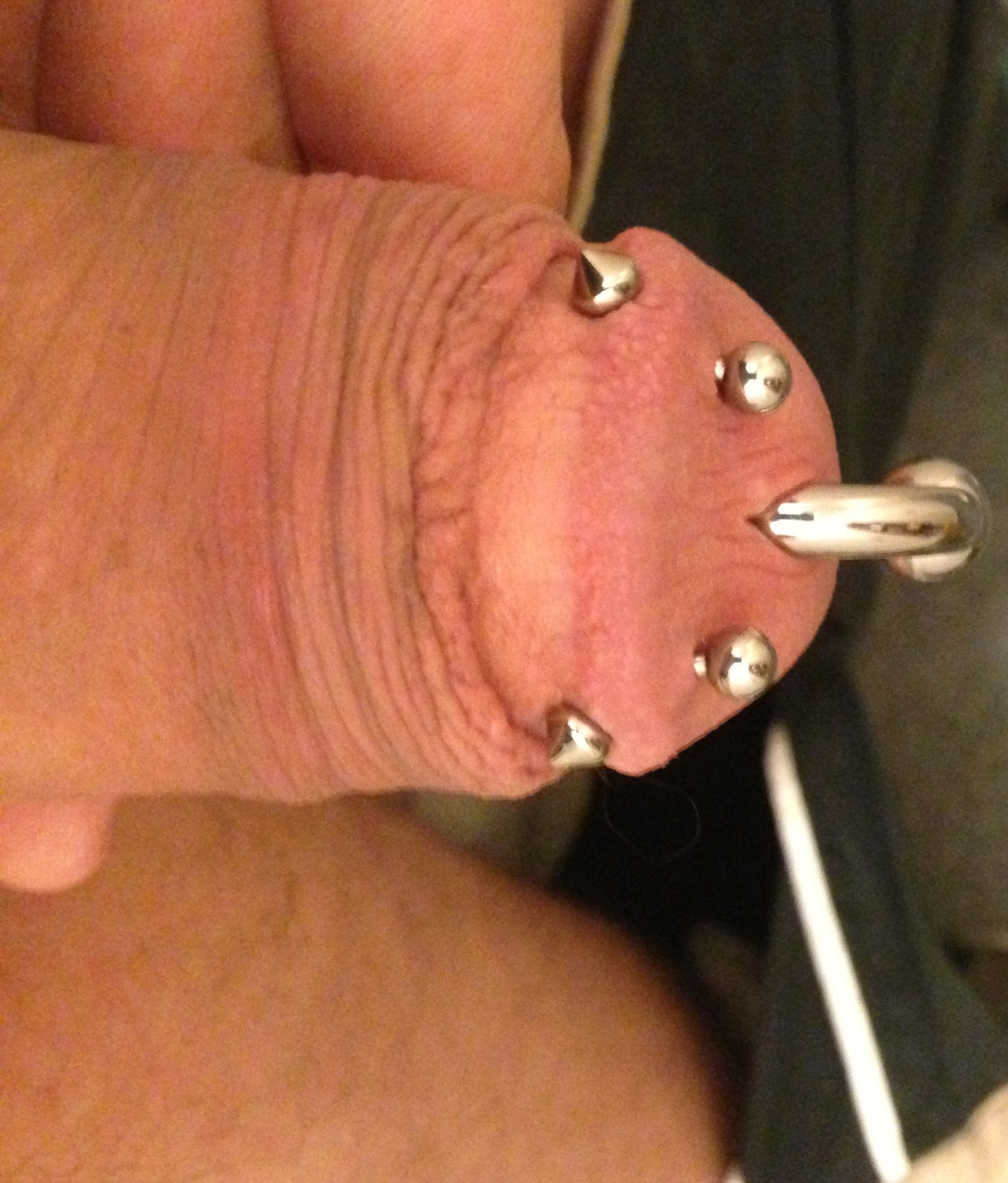
Double dydoe piercings
