= Transscrotal piercing =

Body piercing through the scrotum

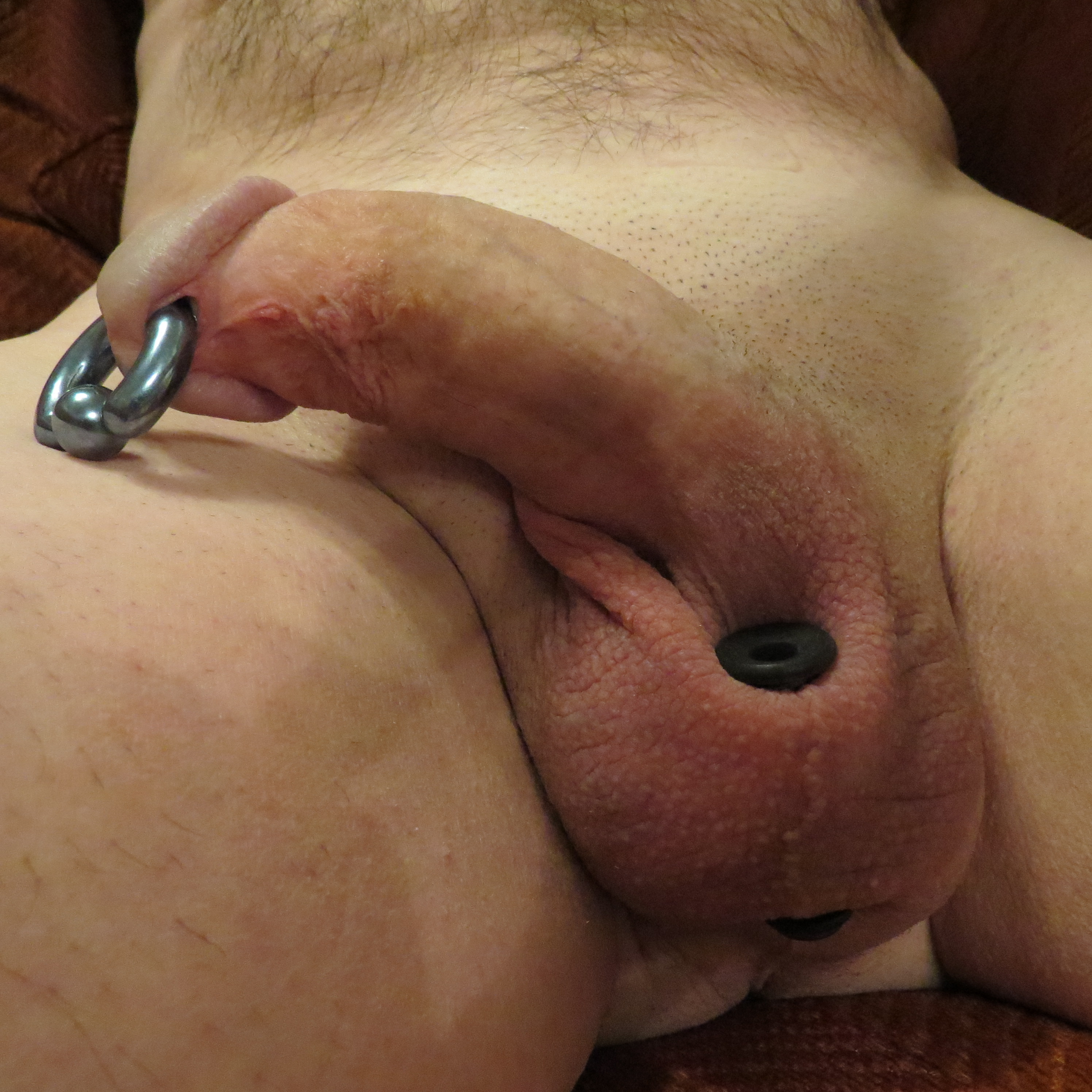
- Location: Scrotum
- Jewelry: Flesh Tunnel

A transscrotal piercing is a body piercing that travels through the scrotum from front to back, or from side to side. It is a high risk procedure.

It is also sometimes spelled transcrotal piercing or referred to as a "scrunnel" (short for scrotal tunnel).
