= Foreskin piercing =

Piercing through the foreskin of the penis

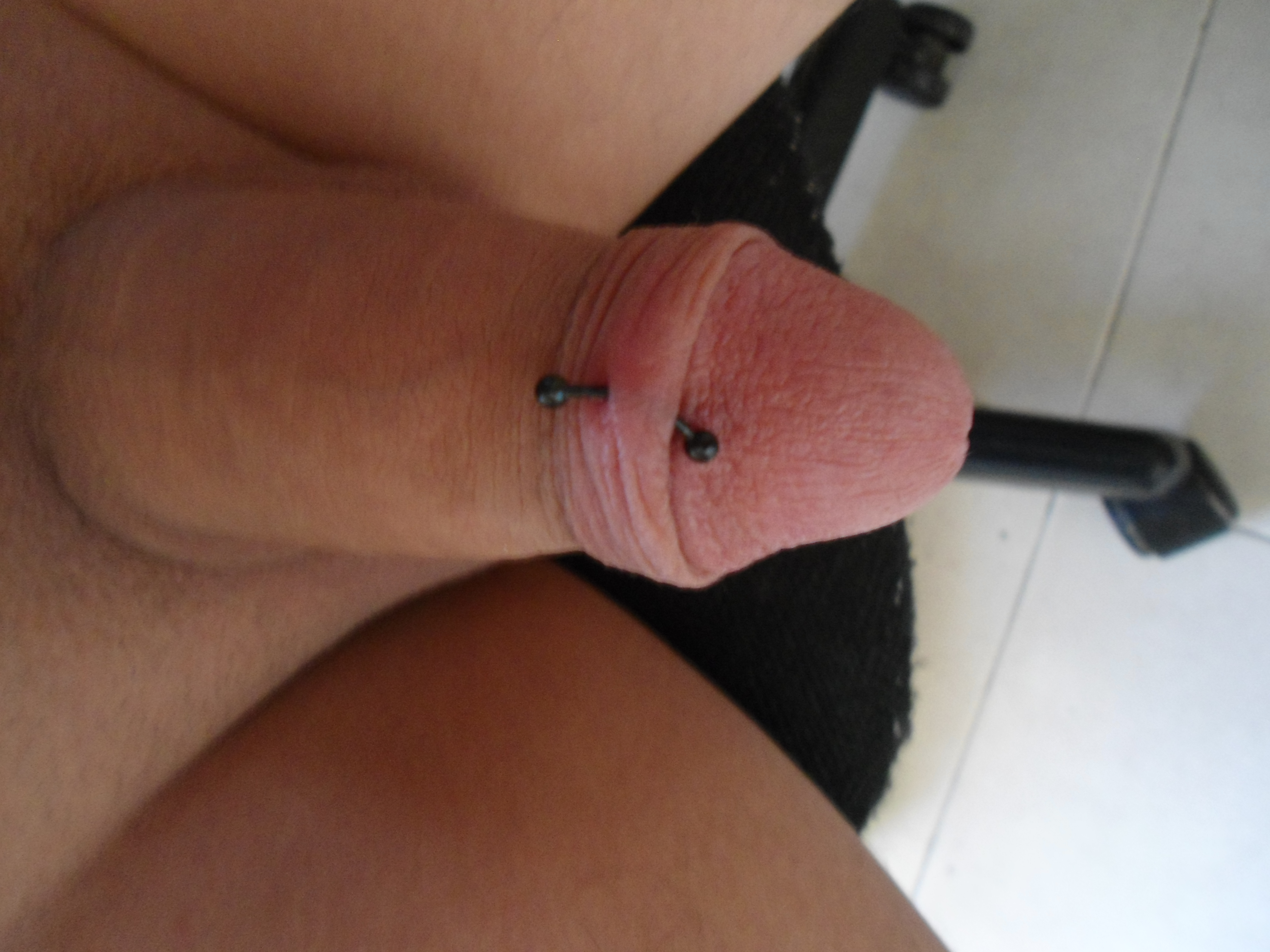
- Location: Foreskin

Foreskin piercing is a piercing that passes through the foreskin of the penis. It is the male equivalent of a clitoral hood piercing in females.

It is a generally fast-healing piercing and involves a relatively simple procedure. The only true requirement is the male must have not been circumcised (or at least have sufficient foreskin left from his circumcision).

Foreskin piercings have been used for male infibulation.

== History ==
Reference to foreskin piercing has been found in ancient writings dating as far back as the first century.

== Kuno piercing ==
A specific type of foreskin piercing that is done under the foreskin end under the glans is referred to as a kuno piercing. Its name is supposedly derived from kynodesme.

== Gallery ==
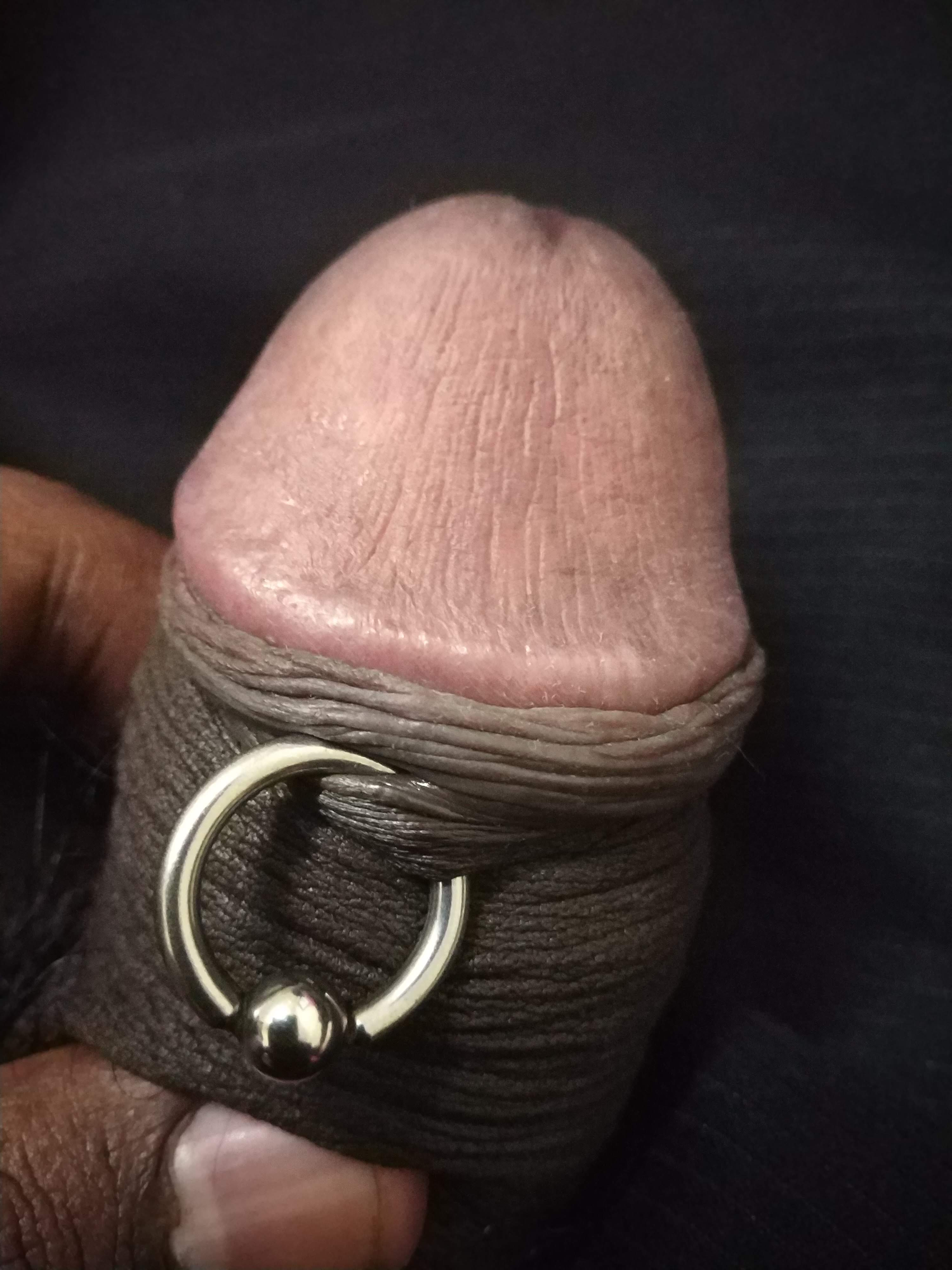
Foreskin piercing with a captive bead ring (also called a BCR or ball closure ring)

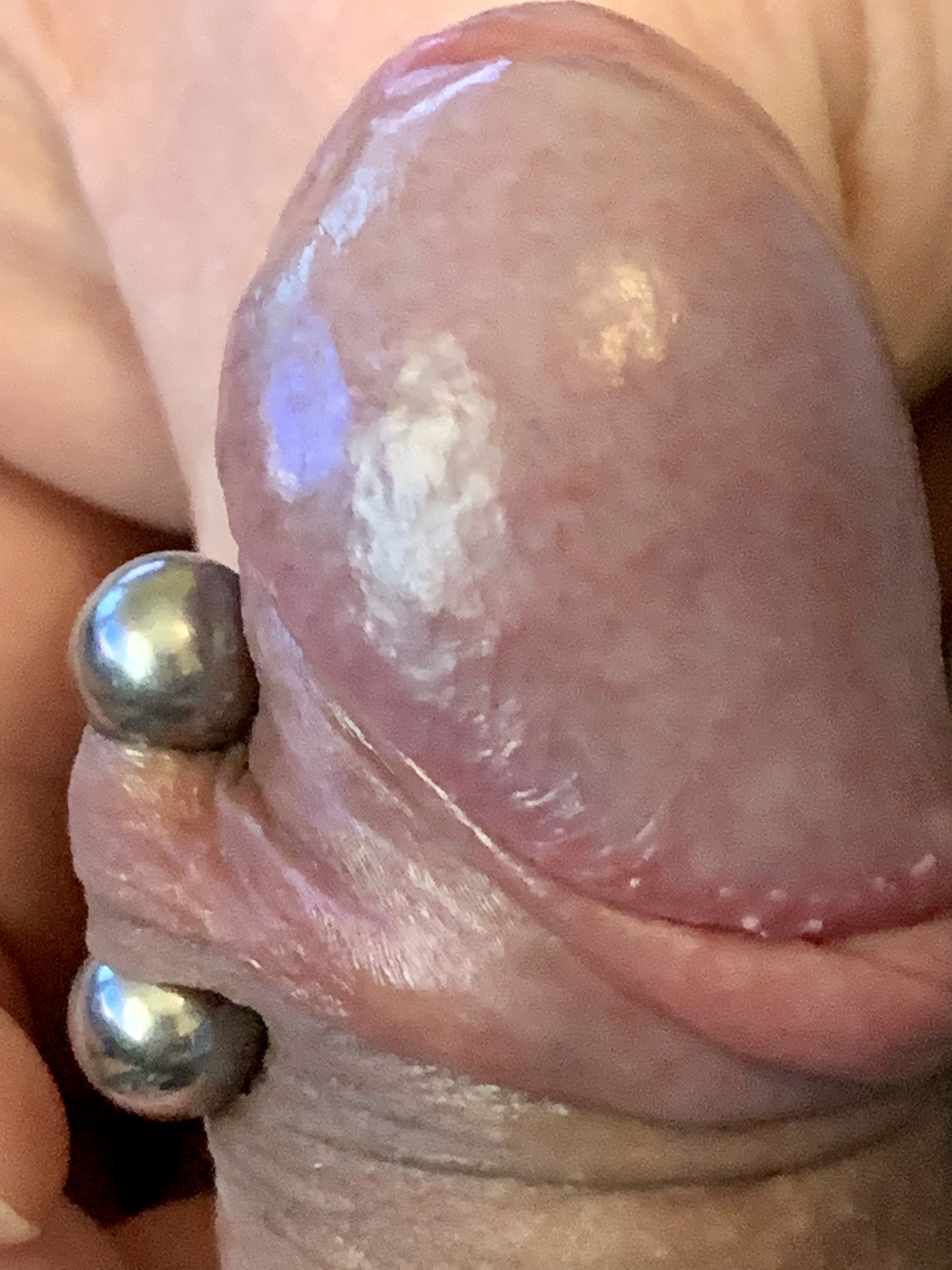
Foreskin piercing with a barbell on the underside of the penis

== See also ==
- Fibula (penile)
