= Fourchette piercing =

Female genital piercing

Fourchette
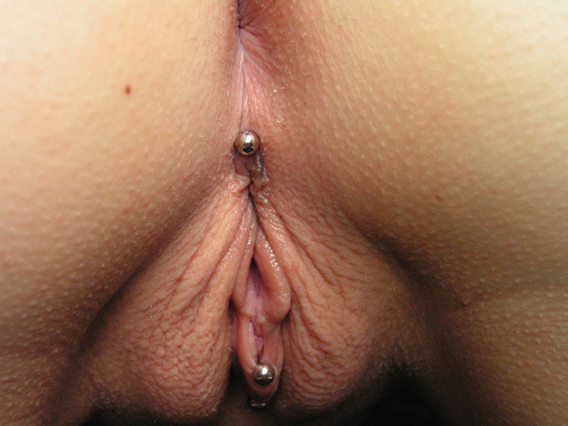
- Location: Frenulum of labia minora
- Healing: 6-8 weeks

A fourchette piercing is a female genital piercing. It is a piercing done at the rear rim of the vulva, in the area of frenulum of labia minora. Many women are not suited for this piercing since they do not have the required flap of skin in the area. Otherwise, placement and piercing tends to be relatively easy although there may be difficulties with aftercare and wear.

== Placement ==
The fourchette piercing is placed at the forward end of the perineum, making it most similar in location to the male guiche piercing. It requires a pinchable flap of skin at the rear rim of the vulva. Piercers should not pierce into the vaginal tissue or vaginal canal as the vaginal tissue often rejects the piercing.

== Piercers ==
Many piercers are not willing to do this piercing. The fourchette is a rare piercing which requires the proper anatomy. Many women do not have the pinchable flap of skin, making the fourchette undoable.

== Healing and aftercare ==
The piercing's proximity to the anus increases the risk of infection. Hygiene is usually a concern, and the wearer must ensure the area is well cleaned following defecation. Healing time is relatively quick, as with all piercings in the genital area. Healing time is usually around four to six weeks.

== Wear ==
Many wearers have reported that this piercing is prone to stretching on its own. Discomfort with sexual intercourse has been reported by some wearers, whereas some may find it quite pleasurable. Migration and rejection of this piercing are fairly common.
