= List of body piercings =

This is a comprehensive list of different types of body piercings.

== Ear piercings ==
- Anti Tragus
- Cat Flap
- Conch
- Contra Conch
- Earlobe
- Faux Rook
- Flat
- Forward Helix
- Helix
- Industrial
- Low Helix
- Mid Helix
- Orbital
- Rook
- Snug
- Stacked Lobe
- Stretched Earlobe
- Surface Tragus
- Tragus
- Daith
- Transverse Lobe
- Vertical conch
- Vertical Helix
- Vertical Industrial
- Vertical Transverse Lobe

== Nose piercings ==
- Austin Bar
- Bridge
- High Nostril
- Mantis
- Nasallang
- Nostril
- Rhino
- Septril
- Septum
- Third Eye

== Facial piercings ==
- Anti-eyebrow, also known as Butterfly Kiss, Crow's Feet, or Teardrop
- Cheek, also known as Dimple(s)
- Cheek Dermal
- Eyebrow
- Horizontal Eyebrow
- Mandible
- Surface Tragus

== Lip piercings ==
- Angel Bites
- Angel Fangs
- Ashley
- Canine Bites
- Cyber Bites
- Dahlia
- Dolphin Bites
- Horizontal Labret
- Jestrum
- Labret
- Lower-Lip Frenulum, also known as Frowny
- Monroe (left side of upper lip)
- Madonna (right side of upper lip)
- Philtrum, also known as Medusa
- Shark Bites
- Side labret, also known as Lateral Labret
- Snake Bites
- Spider Bites
- Upper-Lip Frenelum, also known as Smiley
- Vertical Labret
- Vertical Vermillion, also known as Vampire Bites, Reversed Angel Fangs and Kitty Bites

== Tongue piercings ==
- Frenulum
- Frog Eyes
- Snake Eyes
- Stingray Eyes
- Tongue
- Venom

== Genital piercings ==
- Anal
- Perineum, known as Guiche

=== Male ===
- Ampallang
- Apadravya
- Deep Shaft
- Dydoe
- Foreskin
- Frenum
- Frenum Ladder, also known as Jacob's Ladder
- Hafada
- Lorum
- Magic Cross
- Prince Albert
- Reverse Prince Albert
- Transscrotal

=== Female ===
- Christina
- Clitoral Hood
- Clitoris
- Princess Diana Piercing
- Fourchette
- Isabella
- Labia
- Nefertiti
- Princess Albertina
- Triangle

== Miscellaneous ==
- Achilles Piercing
- Brooch
- Collarbone
- Corset
- Dermal
- Eyeball/Scleral piercing
- Hand Web
- Hip
- Madison
- Nape
- Navel
- Nipple
- Pubic
- Scalp piercing
- Surface Piercing
- Third Nipple
- Uvula
- Wrist
