= Wrist piercing =

Wrist piercings
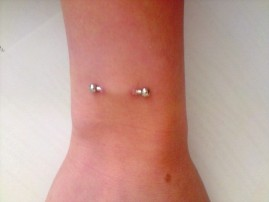
- Location: Wrist
- Jewelry: Barbell, surface bar

A wrist piercing is a piercing through the surface of the wrist, first popularized by Jon Cobb in PFIQ. Wrist piercings are a type of surface piercing. They carry a high rate of rejection and migration, unless they are properly measured and placed. The piercings may be rejected if they are not installed properly; due to the location of the piercings, they are easy to irritate, and regularly catch onto clothing or other objects. Also, wrist piercings can only be done with a special tool (to hook the other side of the surface barbell upside down), and thus, it is of high difficulty for it to be home-made.

== Wrist piercing jewelry ==
As with all surface piercings, wrist piercings require special jewelry to minimize the risk of piercing migration and rejection. Both surface bars and barbells with bars made from flexible material, such as tygon or Teflon, are commonly used as both short and long-term jewelry in wrist piercings. More appropriate is titanium, which is less likely to irritate surrounding skin due to its lack of nickel. A quality piercing is done in two steps with different bars: one with long rises used at the time of piercing to allow for initial swelling, and a second bar with shorter rises and balls a few millimeters from the skin to be inserted months later once healing has taken place. Other jewelry includes specially made and bent barbells.
