= Eyebrow piercing =

Type of body piercing

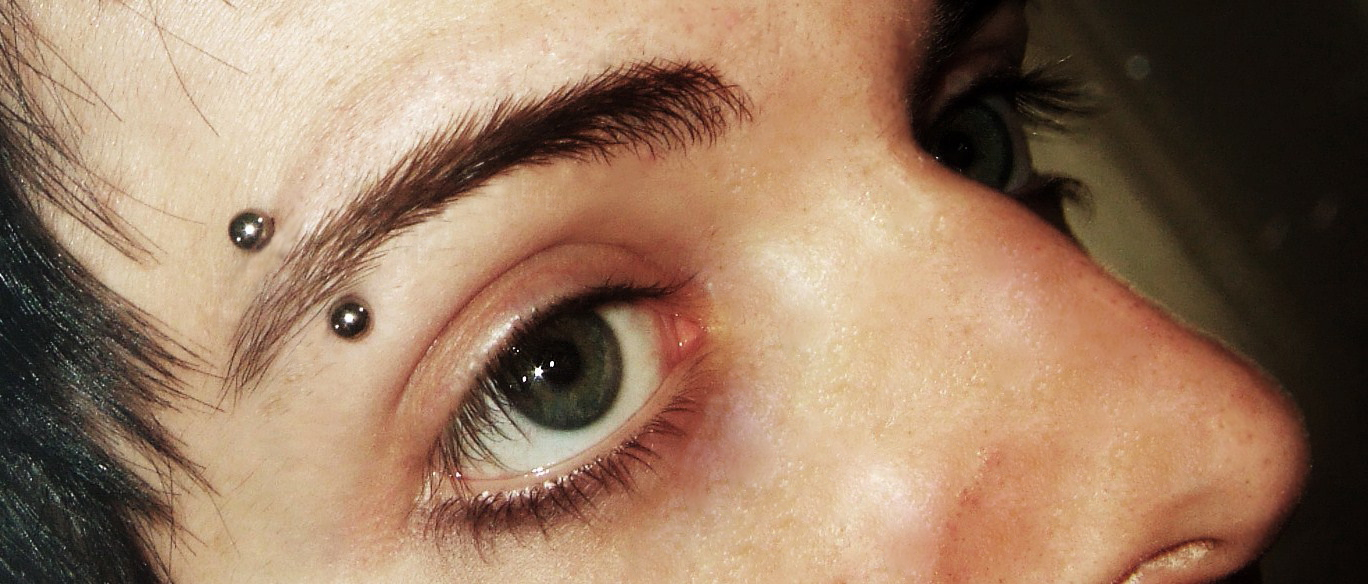
- Location: Eyebrow
- Healing: 6–8 weeks

An eyebrow piercing is a vertical surface piercing, wherein a twelve to eighteen gauge cannula needle is inserted through the bottom of the eyebrow and exits through the top of the eyebrow to permit insertion of jewelry. Those performing the piercing may use a Pennington clamp to better guide the needle through the skin. A curved barbell is the most common jewelry inserted post-piercing.

A piercing of underneath the eye is known as an anti-eyebrow piercing. A horizontal piercing of the eyebrow is known as a horizontal eyebrow piercing.

== Jewelry ==
Barbells, curved barbells and captive bead rings are the common jewelry types worn in eyebrow piercings. Each of these jewelry types put varying degrees of pressure on the piercing, which can cause irritation or piercing migration over time. The larger the gauge used in the piercing, the less likely the piercing is to be rejected or accidentally torn out. Sixteen gauge piercings and jewelry is common.

== Placement ==
The placement of the eyebrow piercing varies according to the will of the one receiving the piercing. The area may be pierced anywhere along the eyebrow from directly above the eye, to the edge of the eyebrow by the temple. Care must be taken if the eyebrow is pierced further in than directly above the eye, because of the presence of supra-orbital nerves. Piercing the eyebrow is safe.

== Healing ==
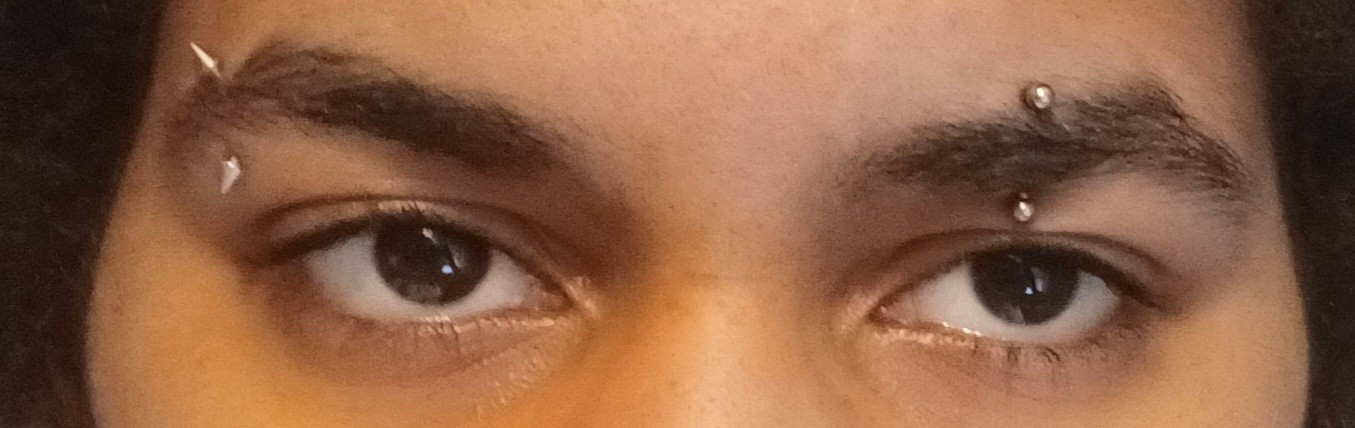
A double eyebrow piercing

After the piercing is completed, the healing process takes a minimum of six weeks to eight weeks for the wound to close properly around the piercing, and it may be six months to a year before the jewelry can be removed for any length of time without the hole closing. It is common for an eyebrow piercing to produce a sticky white discharge or a crust around the jewelry during the healing process. Complications, when reported, are usually fixed with a short-term round of antibiotics. A light bruise is common, due to the high amount of capillaries in the eyebrow and the proximity to the surface of the skin. Sudden pain in the area of the piercing could be a potential sign of infection, and should be checked by a professional immediately.

== History and culture ==
Body piercing has been performed in many cultures for millennia, usually as part of a rite of passage or to identify a person as courageous, strong, or worthy. Eyebrow piercing, however, has a short history. It was introduced by the punk subculture in the 1970s as a fashion statement. Eyebrow piercings were also commonly sported by members of nu metal and post-grunge bands of the mid-1990s and early 2000s, Jonathan Davis of Korn and Aaron Lewis of Staind both having pierced eyebrows.

== See also ==
- Anti-eyebrow
