= Body piercing jewelry =

Jewelry manufactured specifically for use in body piercing

Body piercing jewelry is jewelry manufactured specifically for use in body piercing. The jewelry involved in the art of body piercing comes in a wide variety of shapes and sizes in order to best fit the pierced site. Its shape, dimensions and material vary according to the location of the piercing and the wearer's anatomy. Jewelry may be worn for fashion, cultural tradition, religious beliefs, personal symbolism, and many other reasons.

== History ==
Body piercing ornaments have a long history in different cultures. Among the Alutiiq people of Alaska, decorative plugs known as labrets were worn in piercings below the lips or in the cheeks. Archaeological evidence from the Kodiak Archipelago dates the use of labrets to approximately 2,500 years ago. Their size and decoration could communicate an individual's social standing and personal identity. In Aztec society, ornamental labrets could also signify political authority. Gold lip ornaments, including examples shaped like serpents, were worn by rulers and members of the nobility. A surviving Aztec serpent labret dating from approximately 1300-1521 is held by the Metropolitan Museum of Art in New York.

Originally, hardly any jewelry other than circular earrings were used in modern Western body piercing. As the body piercing became more of a fashion, a vast amount of specially crafted jewelry became available to the public. In the United States, the production of specialized body piercing jewelry expanded during the 1970s alongside the development of the modern body piercing industry. Jim Ward established Gauntlet in 1975, producing jewelry designed for body piercings, including rings and barbells.

Common forms of body piercing jewelry include barbells, captive bead rings, labret studs, curved barbells, plugs and spirals. Different designs are used according to the placement and anatomy of the piercing. Materials used for production have grown from traditional gold and silver to widespread use of surgical steel as well as titanium, niobium, glass, and several kinds of plastics (PTFE, Tygon, bioplast, nylon). Wood, horn, amber, stone, bamboo, silicone, fossilized ivories, tusks, bones, and porcelain can also be used to craft body piercing jewelry.

== Design features ==
The Association of Professional Piercers recommends that jewelry used in initial body piercings be internally threaded, adding that "the part of the jewelry that passes through your skin is smooth, and the threads are on the removable end(s), such as balls, gems, or spikes" On body jewelry pieces, the surfaces and ends must be smooth, free of nicks, scratches, burrs, polishing compounds and metals must have a consistent mirror finish.

== Gallery ==
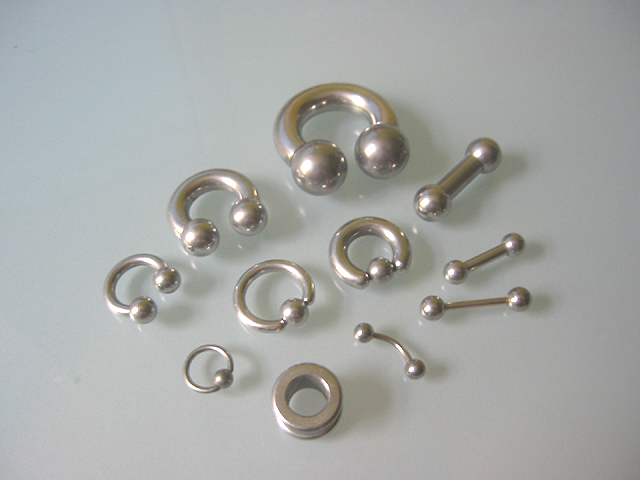
Variety of body piercing jewellery

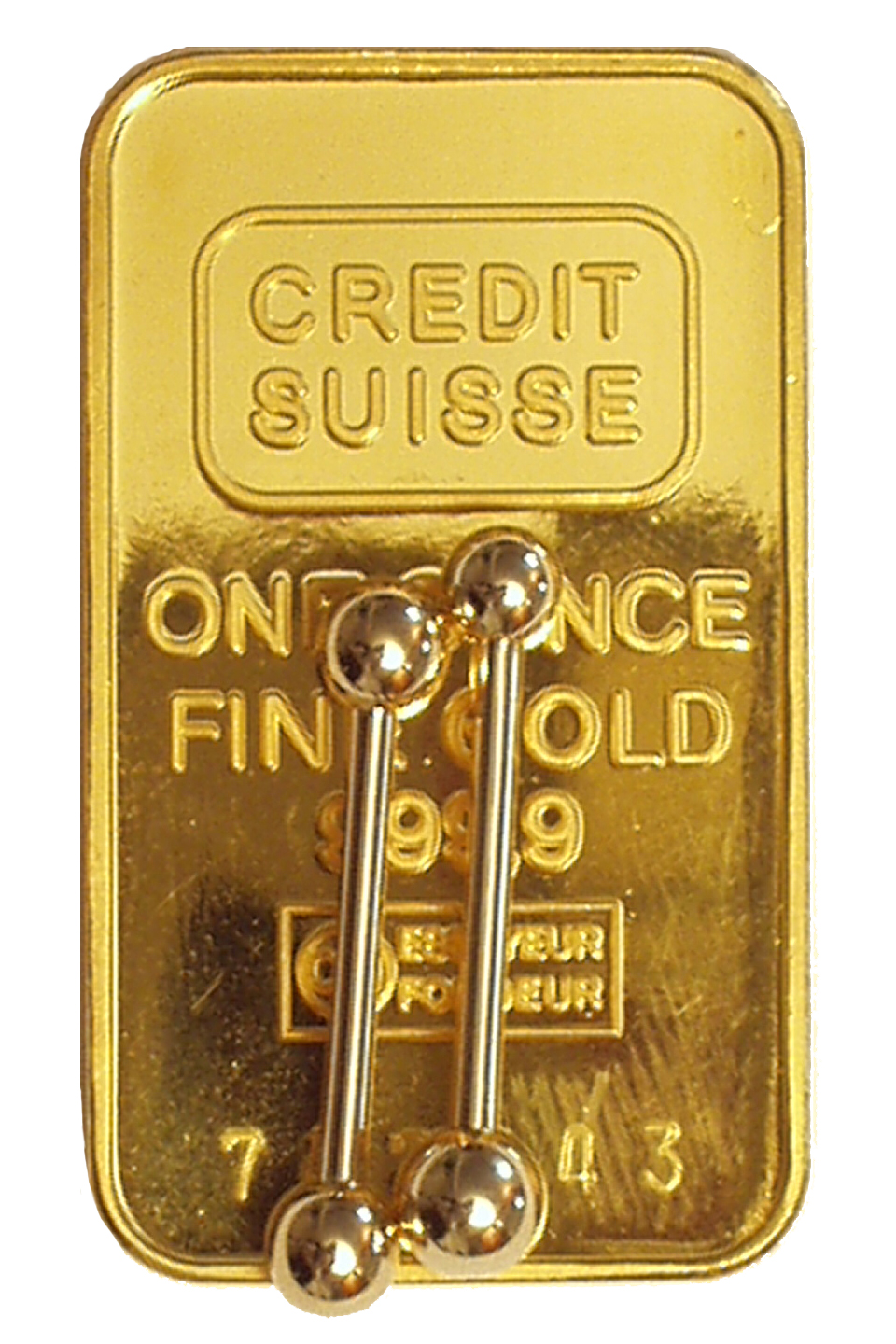
14K gold barbells in front of 24K gold for color comparison

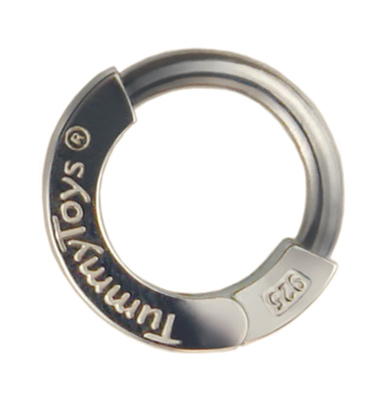
Belly button ring that snaps closed

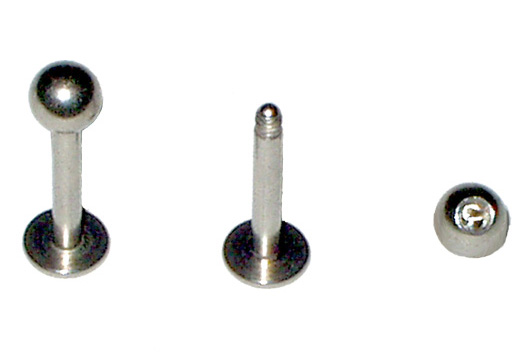
A labret stud is commonly used for piercings through the cheek, such as labret, madonna, monroe, and dimple piercings. It can also be used for other piercings, such as tragus or conchs. Shown with external screw threads.

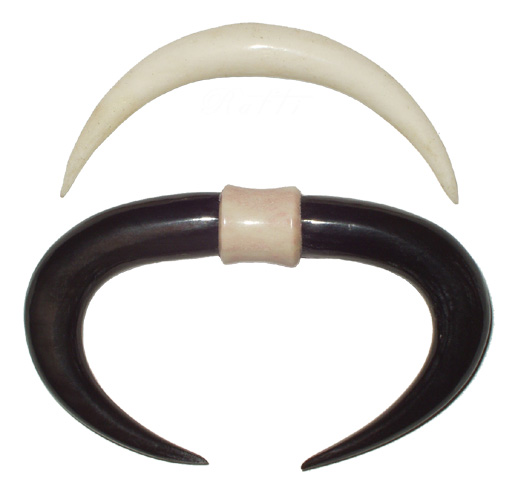
Hand carved tusks made out of horn, normally worn in nasal septum piercings

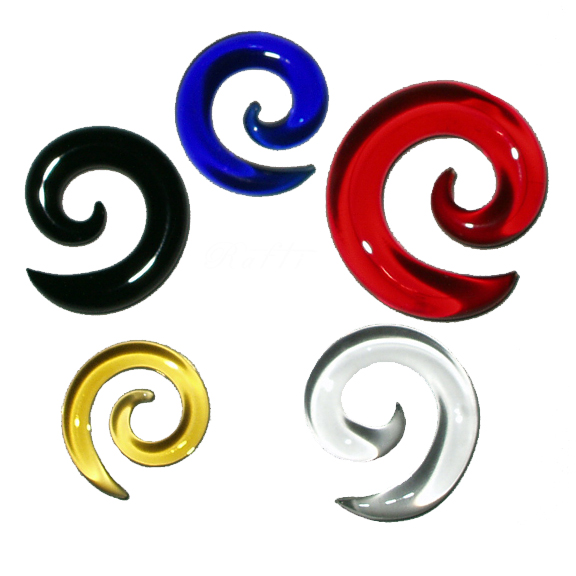
Ear spirals made out of glass

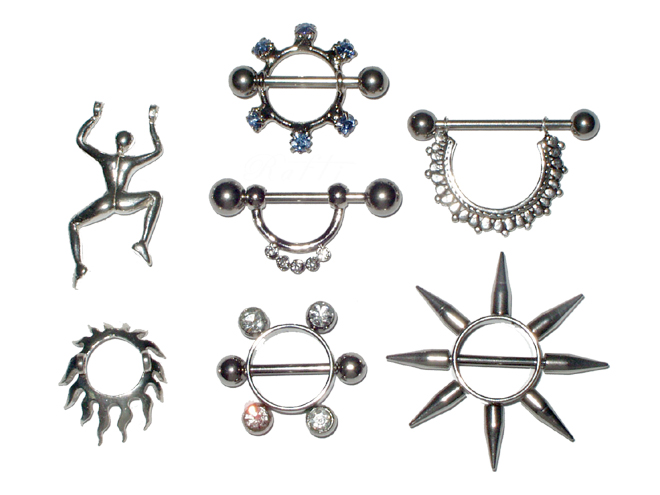
Nipple shields attached to barbells for use in nipple piercings

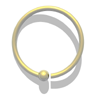
Captive bead ring

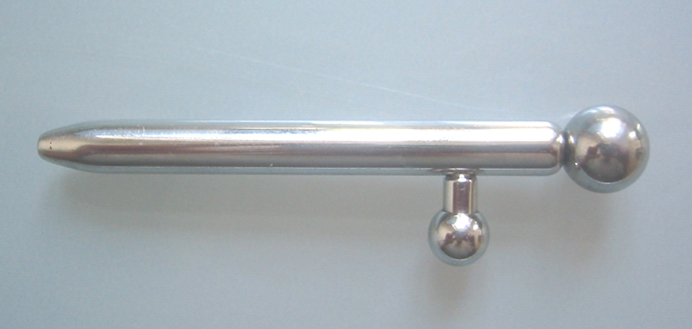
Prince's wand

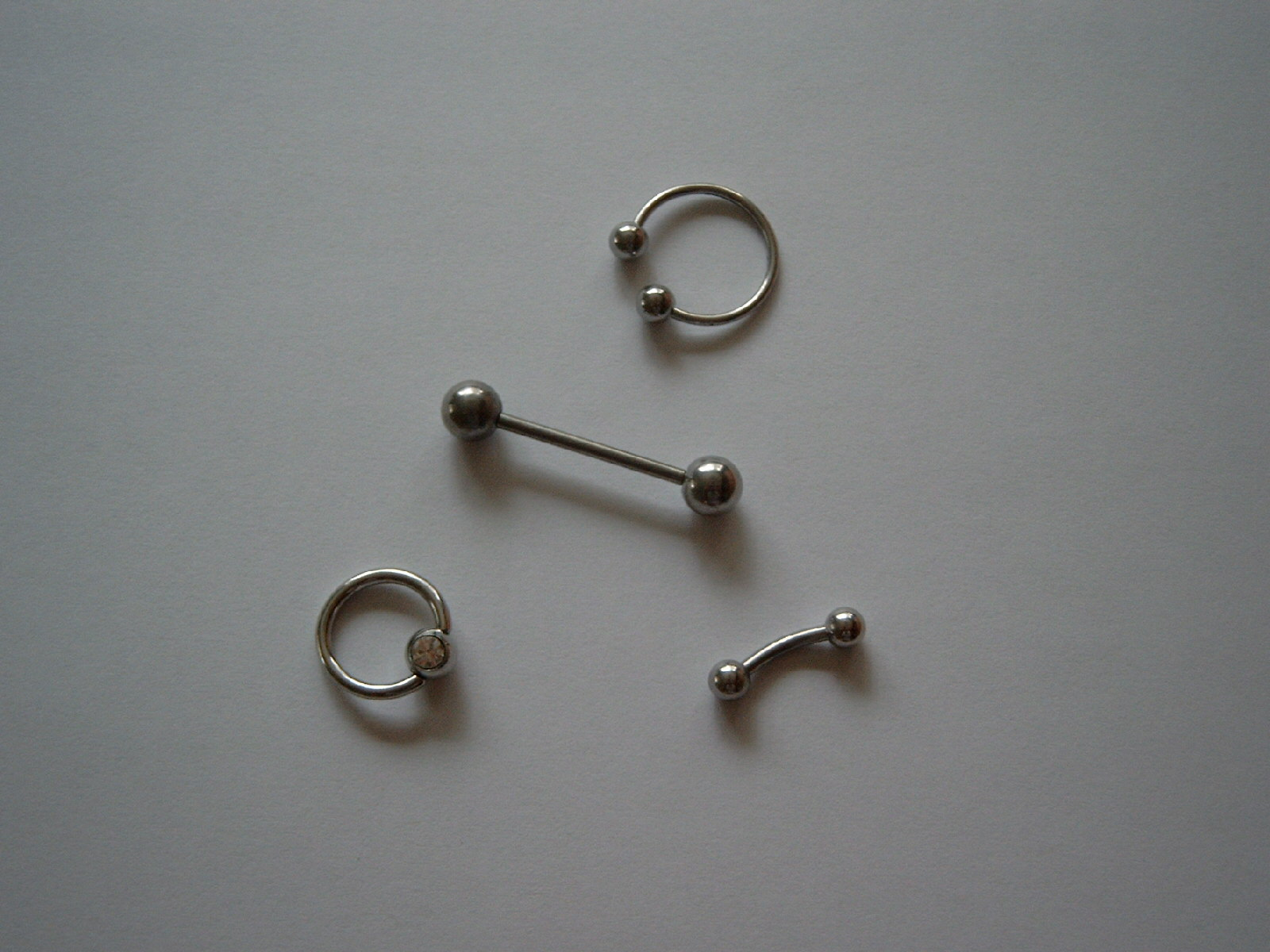
Circular barbell, barbell, ball closure ring and curved barbell

== See also ==
- Body jewelry materials
- Body piercing jewelry sizes
- Barbell
- Captive bead ring
- Claw
- Prince's wand
- Spiral
- Stud
- Flesh tunnel
