= Bridge piercing =

Facial piercing through the skin on the nasal bridge

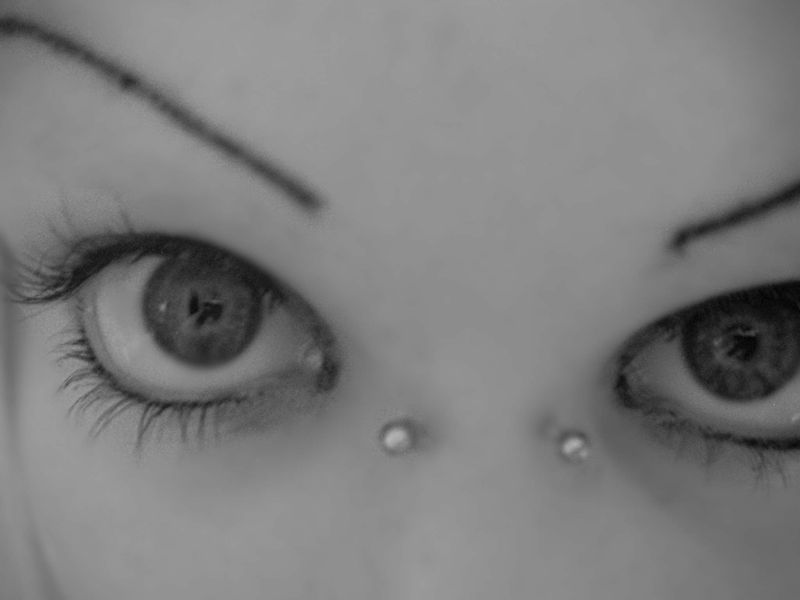
- Nicknames: Erl, Earl
- Location: Nasal bridge
- Jewelry: Straight barbell, surface bar, captive bead ring

A bridge piercing is a facial piercing through the skin on the bridge of the nose, usually directly between the eyes of the wearer. A variation on this piercing, the vertical bridge piercing is a surface piercing, with all of the risks or potential complications related to surface piercings.

== History ==
The bridge piercing is a relatively modern body modification practice. Unlike septum or nostril piercings, which have roots in ancient cultures, the bridge piercing has no known historical or indigenous origins. It is believed to have emerged in the late 20th century with the rise of the contemporary body modification movement.

Body piercer Erik Dakota is often credited with popularizing the bridge piercing, reportedly coining the term "Erl" piercing in the 1980s after a client named Erl Van Aken, who was one of the first individuals to wear it regularly*. The piercing gained traction in alternative and punk subcultures throughout the 1990s, becoming more widely recognized due to increased visibility in body modification publications and online communities*.

As body piercing became more mainstream in the early 2000s, the bridge piercing remained a niche choice due to concerns about rejection and migration, which are common with surface piercings [(Larratt, Shannon, *BME Encyclopedia*, 2008)]. Despite this, it continues to be a distinctive form of self-expression among body modification enthusiasts today.

The risk of rejection is quite high for this piercing, as it is a surface piercing. There is also a high risk of scarring when the jewelry is removed.

Besides decorative jewelry, bridge piercings can hold spectacles.

== Jewelry ==
Bridge piercings are most commonly pierced with straight barbells, although curved barbells and surface bars are also possible initial jewelry. Once the piercing is healed, it is possible to wear a captive bead ring in it, although depending on the placement of the piercing, a D-ring styled ring may be necessary to prevent migration caused by the pressure exerted by the shape of a ring.

Like many other facial piercings, there are many misconceptions about bridge piercings. Some involve eye problems, such as involuntary eye crossing. Other beliefs have to do with infections from piercings spreading to the brain, via the sinuses.
