= Madison piercing =

Type of piercing located at the front of the neck

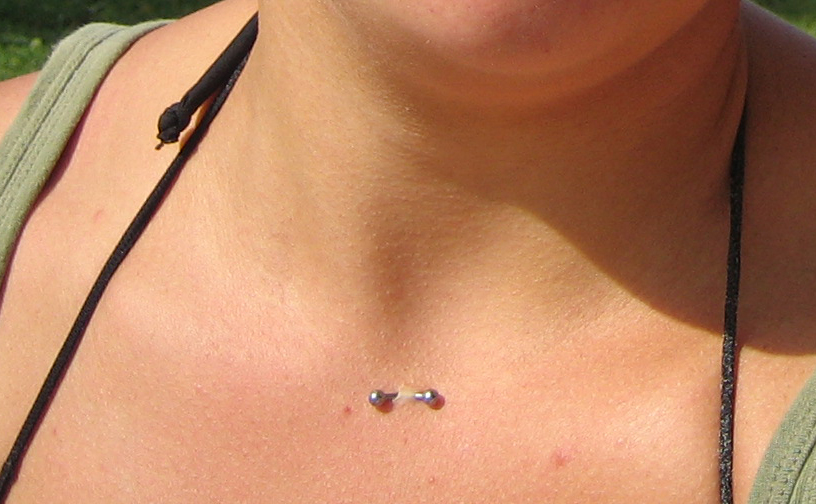
- Location: Surface of neck
- Jewelry: Surface bar

A Madison piercing is a body piercing going through the skin at the front of the neck. They are surface piercings, and have a high rate of migration and rejection. They have a long healing period, if they heal at all. The Madison piercing is named after the first person publicly associated with it, the porn star Madison Stone.

== Health issues ==
The vast majority of Madison piercings will reject or migrate. In a three-year, informal study by the Association of Professional Piercers, out of twelve participants with Madison Piercings, nine were removed due to migration during the first year and the remaining three had not healed. At the end of the three-year study, only one piercing had healed and was still worn. Poorly healed, migrating or rejected piercings can cause scarring. Initial jewelry for a Madison Piercing is usually a surface bar, although flexible barbell style jewelry may also be used. It is not unheard for these piercings to be performed with captive bead rings, although this will almost always lead to migration and rejection.
