= Uvula piercing =

Body piercing through the uvula

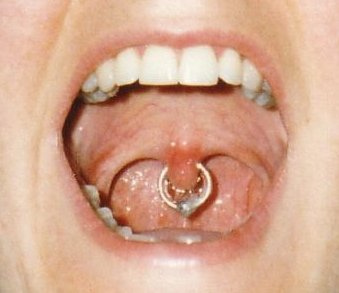
- Location: Uvula
- Jewelry: Captive bead ring

A uvula piercing is a body piercing through the uvula, the projection of the soft palate between the tonsils. This is a rare piercing. Captive bead rings or other small rings are the most commonly seen jewellery in uvula piercings.

== Health issues ==
The piercing is rare due to the gag reflex, which makes it difficult to administer or receive it. Should jewelry pierced through the uvula come loose, it may be swallowed or even inhaled, which would require surgery to remove.

As with tongue piercings, there is a risk of crush injury during the piercing, swelling, and infection. The jewelry will also pull the uvula down during sleep, reducing the diameter of the nasal airway and increasing the chance of sleep-related breathing disorders such as snoring. Uvula piercings may migrate leading to bisection of the uvula, which is harmless.

== History and culture ==
As the piercing is not usually visible, motivations for receiving it are usually personal.
