= Pubic piercing =

Piercing at the base of the penis or mons pubis

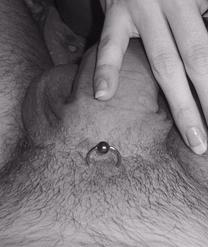
- Location: Mons pubis or base of penis
- Jewelry: Captive bead ring
- Healing: 10 to 12 weeks

A pubic piercing is a body piercing in the pubic area, done either at the base of the penis or the mons pubis (pubic mound). In the latter case it is known as a Christina piercing.

Healing times are typically around 3–4 months. As this is essentially a surface piercing, the rejection rate is higher than more conventional piercings, such as the nose piercing, ear piercing, or tongue piercing.

Some people have this piercing because it can offer direct stimulation to the clitoris during sexual intercourse. Standard placement is horizontal, at the bottom of the mons pubis and the top of the base of the penile shaft. Curved barbells are the most common initial jewellery, although a ring may be an option and many wearers replace their starting jewellery with rings once the piercing has healed.

== Healing ==
A healing time of 10–12 weeks can be expected. As with other types of surface piercing, migration and rejection are common.

Pubic piercings of various types
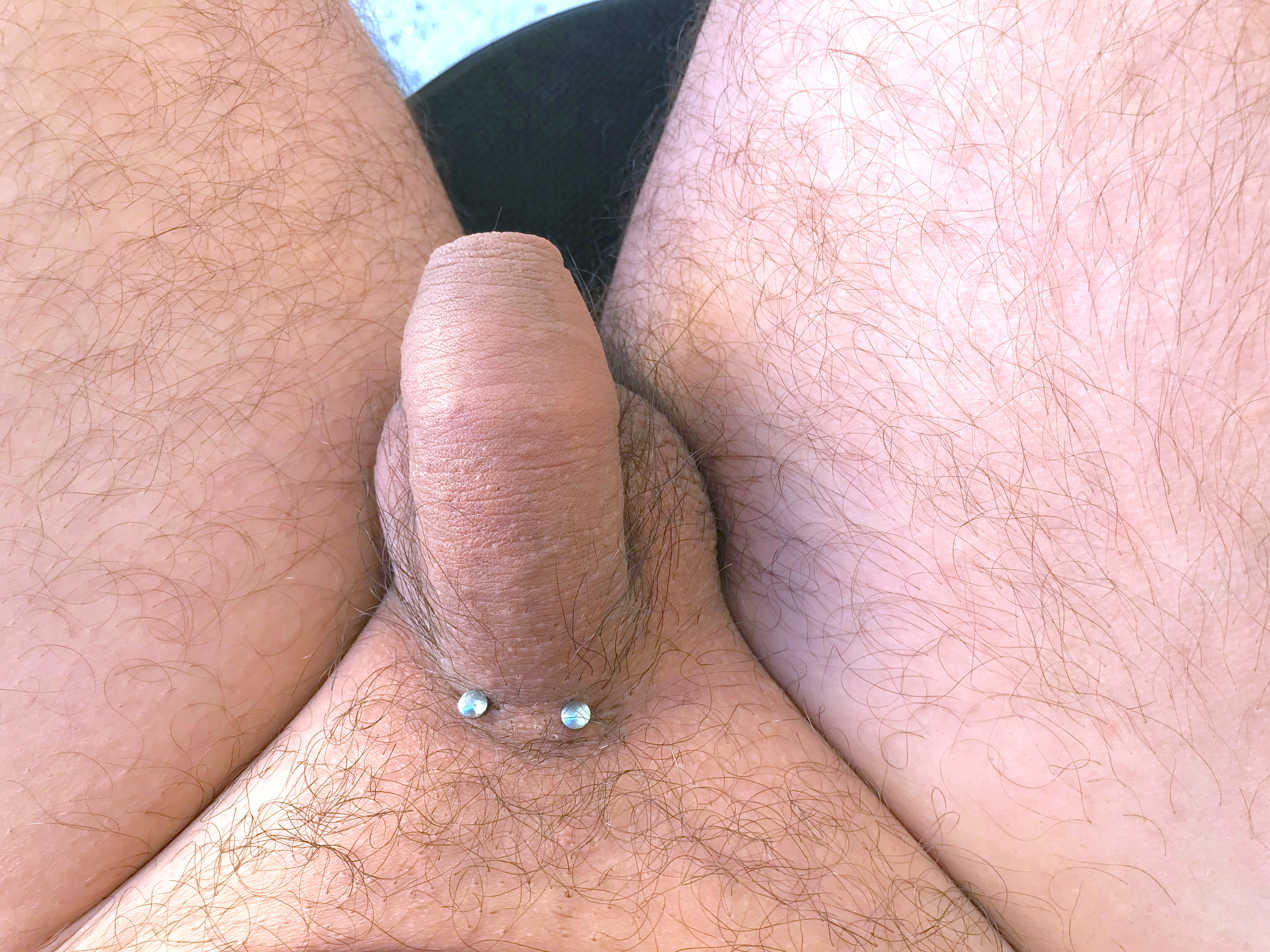
20 mm piercing

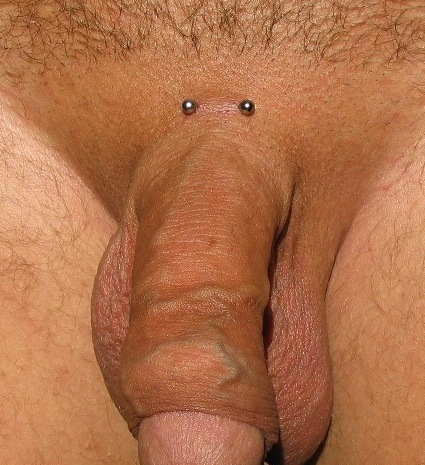
Modified banana barbell

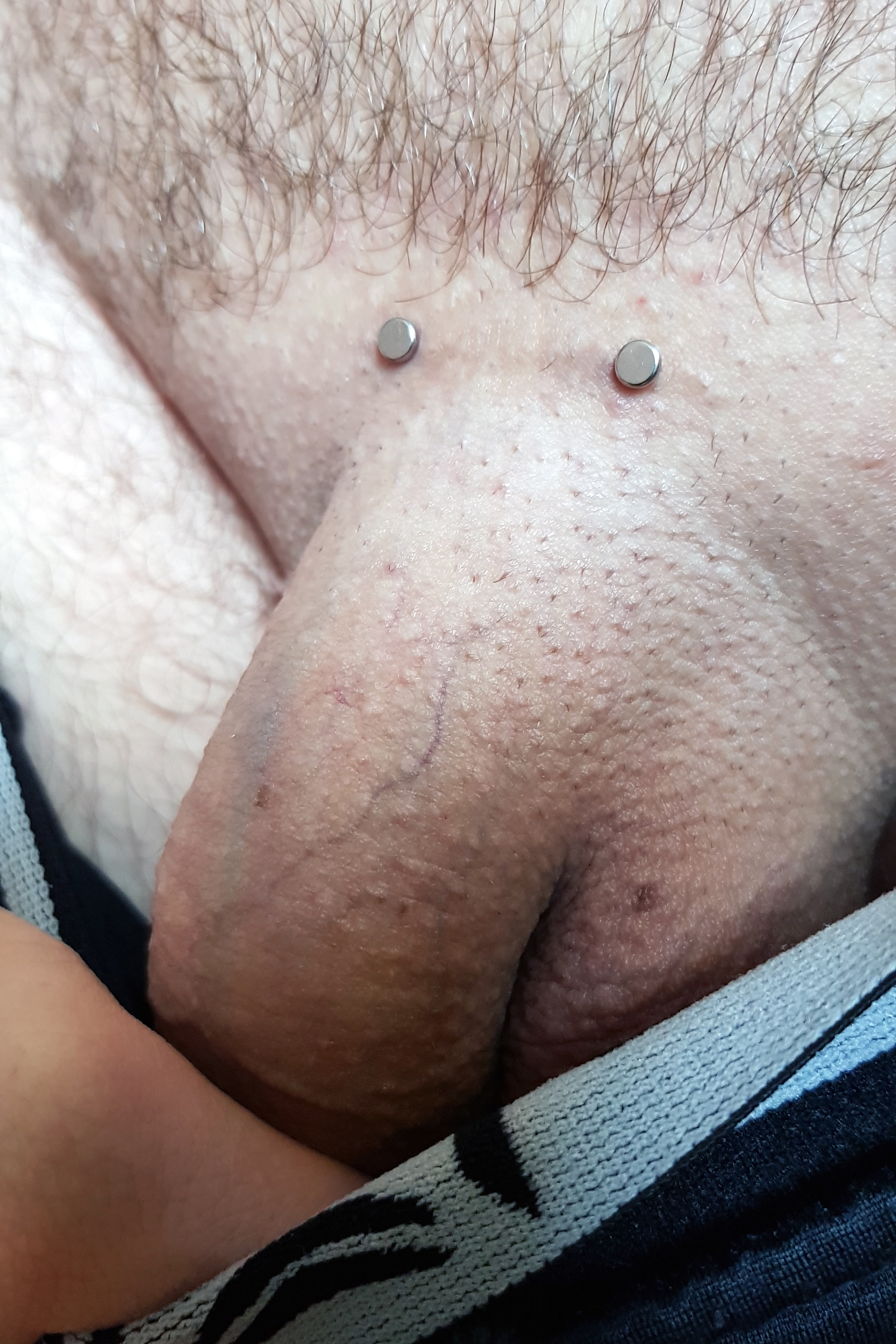
22 mm surface piercing, internally threaded 1.5 mm, discs
