= Neck piercing =

Type of body piercing

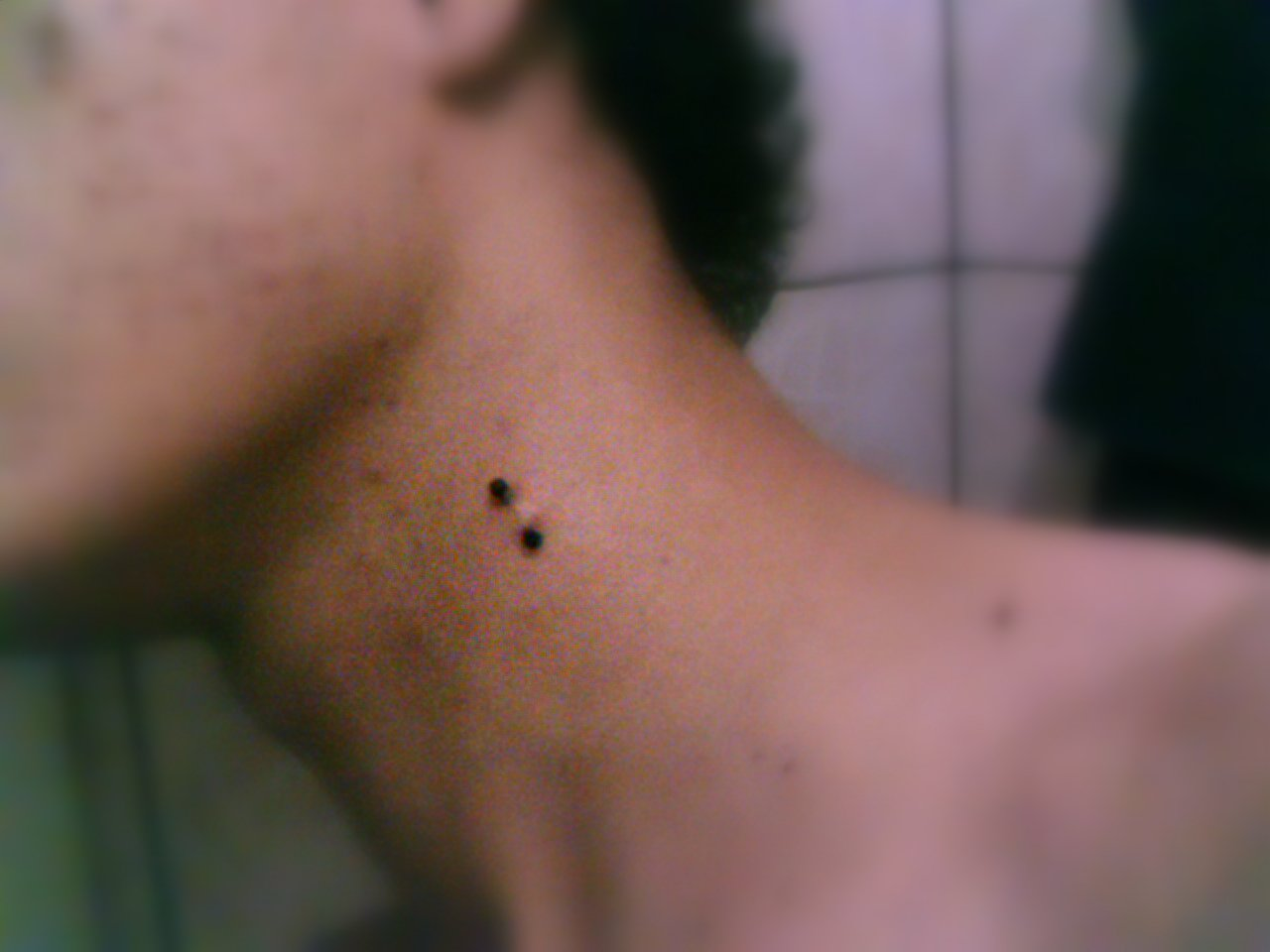
- Nicknames: Vampire Bites
- Location: Surface of neck
- Jewelry: Surface Bar

A neck piercing is a series of surface piercings done to emulate the appearance of a bite on the side of a person's neck. A barbell is placed in the skin of the side of the neck.

Straight barbells will, in almost every case, cause a surface piercing to be rejected. Surface bars are the most suitable jewelry for vampire bite piercings, though curved barbells, U-turn barbells, and dermal anchors also work.

This piercing is also commonly done through the loose flesh on the back of the neck and is called a nape piercing.

Shortly after the piercing is performed, the surrounding area is prone to swelling and bleeding. The neck will continue to stay swollen for the next few days, and the skin around the ends of the piercing will be red and inflamed.
