= Hip piercing =

Type of body piercing

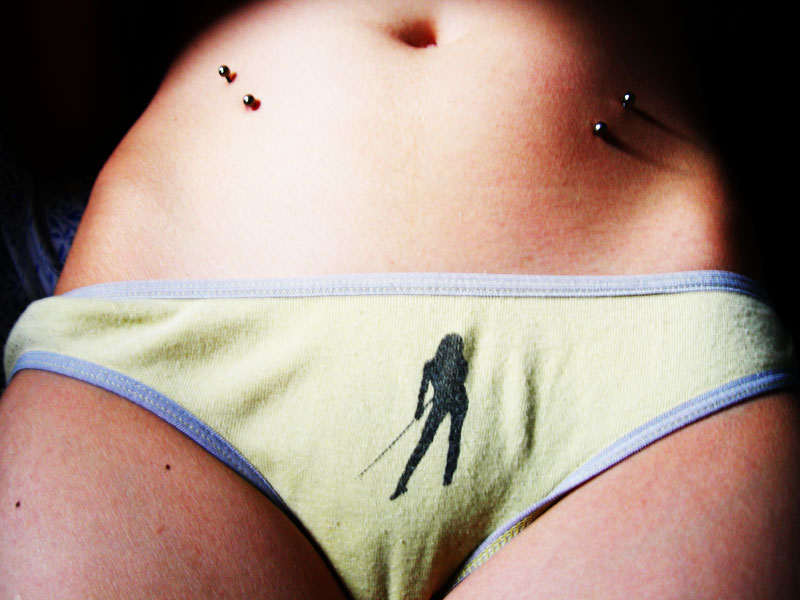
- Location: Hip
- Jewelry: Barbell
- Healing: Approximately 1 year

A hip piercing is a piercing in the pelvic area through the skin near the hip bone. Hip piercings are often done in couplets with one on each hip, but it is not unusual to see only one. Hips piercing is a type of surface piercing. Microdermals or skin divers can be implanted in the hip area to give a similar appearance.

== Jewelry ==
This piercing is generally fitted with a surface barbell. This type of jewelry is usually surgical steel or titanium, with two 90-degree angles that can be shaped in various ways to better fit the anatomy of the piercing. Some artists also use Tygon jewelry. This is a type of plastic that is said to reduce stress on the piercing because the long surface bars are better. This is because more skin is pierced and the piercing is less superficial which reduces the risk of rejection. Skin divers and dermal anchors are becoming more common in hip piercings due to their slightly lower rejection rate and higher longevity than surface bars. Hip piercings heal within six weeks, through the dropout process.

== Procedure ==
For microdermal implants, there are two ways to pierce the skin. One way is with a needle, and the other is with a dermal punch. With the needle, the area which is going to be pierced is first sterilized with a surgical scrub. The area is then pierced, however, unlike other conventional piercings, the needle punctures the skin in an L shape rather than a straight puncture. This pouch is where the plate and anchor of the dermal piercing will be placed. This jewelry is inserted into the skin via surgical tweezers and/or pincers called forceps. The jewelry is then screwed into the plate. For the dermal punch, the process is similar to the needle, however, rather than making the L shape in the skin by separation of the skin, the punch removes skin and tissue to create the space. Using the dermal punch is also more protective because it prevents the piercing from going too deep into the skin. This method is more common because it is quicker and less painful than the difficult needle puncture.

For surface piercings, the process is completely different. Rather than puncturing one piece of jewelry into the skin at a time, a surface piercing sends a barbell (piercing) through a hollow tunnel right under the surface of the skin. Just like the micro dermal piercing, there are two methods to this process. One includes the use of a needle, and the other utilizes a scalpel. With a needle, the surface piercing of the hip is done just like any other place on the body such as a nose piercing, or ear piercing. Pinching the skin together allows for a quick puncture through the skin on the hip. This process is less popular because of the higher rejection rate due to the jewelry being less optimal than the dermal jewelry. The second procedure, using a scalpel, creates a pocket under the skin for the jewelry to reside. This process will reduce stress on the piercing and has a lower rejection rate.

== Risks ==
The biggest risk that comes with a hip piercing is rejection or piercing migration. This is a result of the body recognizing a foreign object and pushing it out. Rejection rates vary depending on the person’s skin, the activities a person partakes in that may create tension in that area, and the jewelry or procedure used. Sitting down for a consultation with a professional piercer is highly recommended before this type of piercing. Another risk includes tissue damage, which is the damaging of blood vessels or nerves in the dermis or dermal layer. This is more likely to happen when the piercing is done by someone who is not a professional. If the piercing is too deep, the skin layers may pull together, resulting in embedding. Shallow piercings will result in migration or rejection. The last risk is bacterial infection, which occurs when the equipment used is not sterilized, or the piercing is not well cared for during the healing process. Pus and inflammation may develop if the piercing becomes infected, however, careful cleaning and aftercare can avoid this risk.

== History and culture ==
Hip piercings are considered contemporary in origin.
