= Hand web piercing =

Piercing through the web of the hand

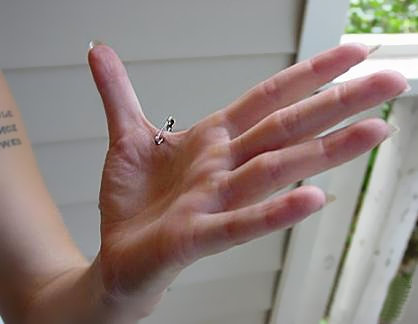
- Location: Skin between fingers
- Jewelry: barbell, captive bead ring

A hand web piercing is a piercing through the web of the hand (Interdigital Fold) between two digits, such as between the fore-finger and middle-finger or fore-finger and thumb. This piercing has a high rate of rejection because of the nature of the tissue and how dynamic or mobile the area is. Risk of infection is also higher due to it being on the hand, (hands touch surfaces with bacteria and viruses).
