= Play piercing =

Temporary body piercing experience

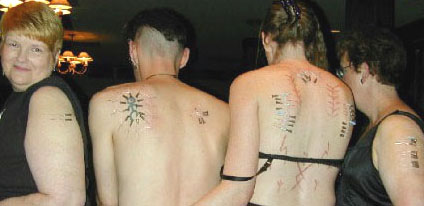
4 Piercees at the Death Equinox '99 convention

Play piercing, needle play, or recreational acupuncture is body piercing done as a recreational, short-term activity rather than to produce a permanent body decoration. Needles and other tools used in play piercing are removed from the body when the activity is complete, allowing the wounds to heal. Those who engage in play piercing may do so for self-expression, spiritual self-discovery, sexual pleasure, or entertainment.

Play piercing risks the transmission of bloodborne diseases (due to needlestick injuries, for example) or puncture wounds.

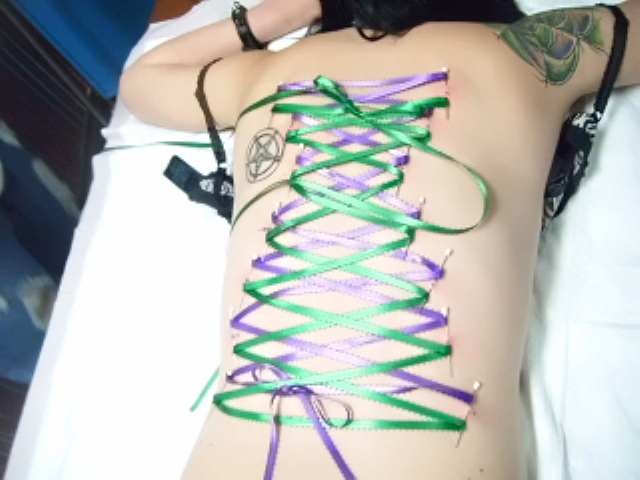
Corset piercing on a woman's back

Needles may be arranged in aesthetically pleasing configurations such as a smiley face, may be laced together like a corset, or may be used to sew on temporary decorations such as bells using sterile thread to result in a different type of sensation.

A more extreme form of play piercing is flesh hook suspension where a person is suspended vertically or horizontally by one or more hooks through their flesh. This practice is done in some cultures as a rite of passage or as part of a BDSM performance. There are also dance rituals in which flesh hooks attached to several people are attached together.

== See also ==
- Acupuncture
- Genital piercing
- Modern primitive
- Body modification
- Risk-aware consensual kink (RACK)
- Suspension (body modification)
