= Nasal bridge =

Bony part of the nose, overlying the nasal bones

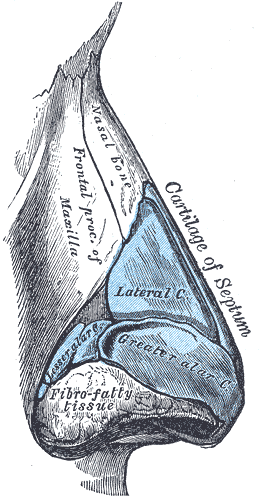
Nasal bridge is the bony part of the nose, overlying the nasal bones, above the part in blue labeled "Cartilage of Septum".

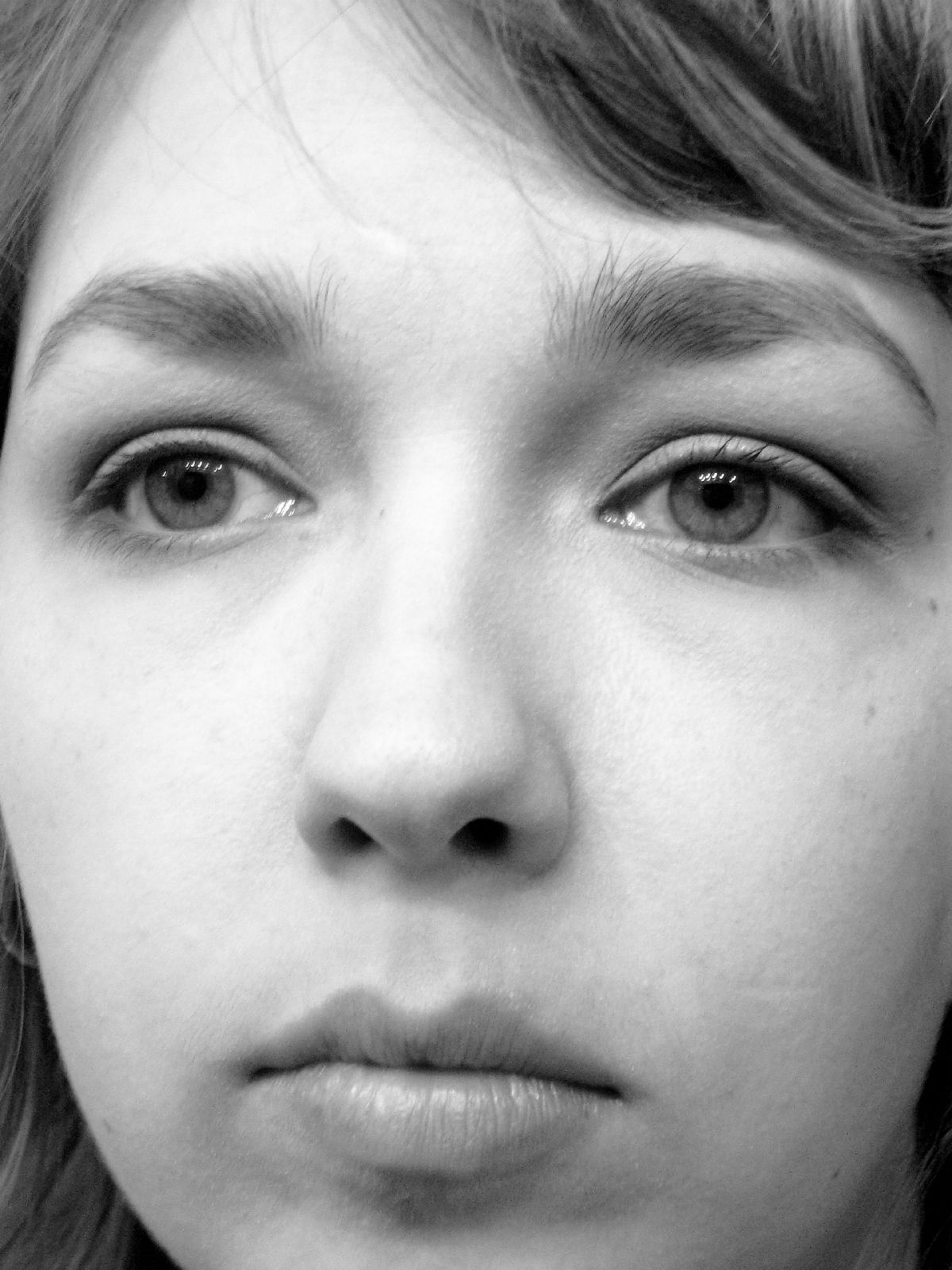
The bridge is between the eyes, and just below them. The lower half of the nose is below the bridge.

The nasal bridge is the upper part of the nose, where the nasal bones and surrounding soft tissues provide structural support. While commonly discussed in human anatomy, nasal bridges exist in various forms across many vertebrates, particularly mammals. The shape, size, and function of the nasal bridge are influenced by evolutionary adaptations, playing a key role in respiration, sense of smell, and thermoregulation.

== Anatomy ==
=== Humans ===
In humans, the nasal bridge is the elevated region of the nose between the eyes. It is primarily formed by the two small, oblong nasal bones, which meet at the midline to form the internasal suture. The nasal bridge extends from the nasal root, where the nose meets the forehead, to the lower edge of the nasal bones. Laterally, it reaches the inner canthi, the medial corners of the eyes, creating a saddle-shaped contour across the upper nose.

The height and shape of the nasal bridge vary among individuals and populations, reflecting genetic diversity and environmental adaptations. A high nasal bridge, often associated with a proportionally elongated nasal passage, is observed with greater frequency in populations indigenous to cold climates. This morphology is hypothesized to enhance the conditioning of inhaled air through increased surface area for heat and moisture exchange, which mitigates the physiological stress of frigid, desiccating atmospheric conditions. By contrast, a lower nasal bridge is more prevalent in populations originating from warm, humid environments, where airflow efficiency may be prioritized. However, this morphology is a polygenic trait shaped by complex genetic, developmental, and environmental factors, leading to substantial variation within and between populations.

The procerus muscle, a small pyramidal muscle in the glabella, creates horizontal wrinkles on the nasal bridge. It is involved in facial expressions such as frowning and those associated with attentional control, and it indirectly helps shield the eyes from bright light. Because it contributes to wrinkle formation, it is often targeted in non-surgical facial rejuvenation treatments, such as botulinum toxin injections.

=== Animals ===
The nasal bridge, or its analogies, varies widely across animal species. In canines, the nasal bridge is typically elongated, supporting extensive nasal passages, though brachycephalic breeds exhibit a notably shortened structure due to selective breeding. In birds, the nasal bones are often fused with the skull.

== Association with epicanthic folds ==
Low-rooted nasal bridges are closely associated with epicanthic folds. A lower nasal bridge is more likely to cause an epicanthic fold, and vice versa.

== Dysmorphology ==
A lower or higher than average nasal bridge in humans can be a sign of various genetic disorders, such as fetal alcohol syndrome. A flat nasal bridge can be a sign of Down syndrome (Trisomy 21), Fragile X syndrome, 48,XXXY variant Klinefelter syndrome, or Bartarlla-Scott syndrome. A broad nasal bridge can be a sign of Snijders Blok–Campeau syndrome.

An appearance of a widened nasal bridge can be seen with dystopia canthorum, which is a lateral displacement of the inner canthi of the eyes. Dystopia canthorum is associated with Waardenburg syndrome.

== See also ==
- Aquiline nose – Human nose with a prominent bridge
- Bridge piercing – Facial piercing through the skin on the nasal bridge
