= Anti-eyebrow =

Type of facial piercing

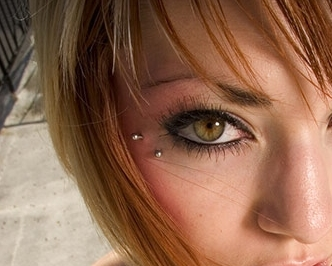
- Nicknames: Upper cheek, tear, teardrop, butterfly kiss, crows feet.
- Location: Above cheek bone, below eyebrow
- Jewelry: Surface bar
- Healing: 4 to 6 months

An anti-eyebrow is a facial piercing that is placed above the cheek bone or below the eyebrow. Normally it is done with a small surface bar. This piercing can be vertical or horizontal, depending on the person's preference. Though it is a surface piercing, with proper care, placement, and jewelry, it can be a viable long-term piercing. Long-term viability is best with proper surface bars, and significantly reduced when barbells, or curved barbells are used. Often reputable piercers will refuse to do surface piercings, instead preferring sub-dermal implants.

Anti-eyebrows are also known as upper cheek piercings, tears, and teardrops or butterfly kiss.
