= Philtrum piercing =

Piercing in the vertical groove in the middle area of the upper lip

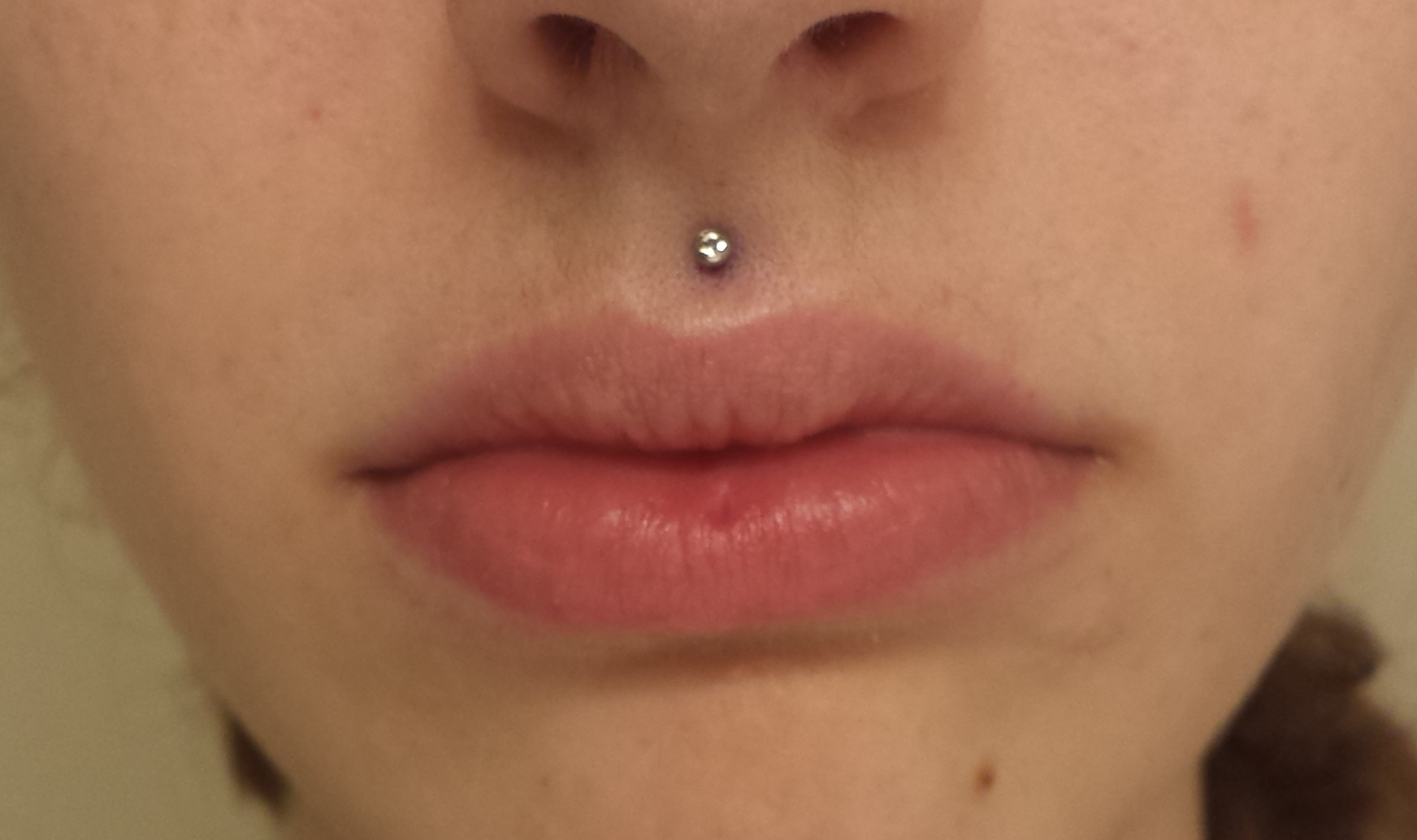
- Nicknames: Medusa
- Location: Philtrum

A philtrum piercing, nicknamed a medusa piercing, is an upper lip piercing placed in the philtrum, directly under the septum of the nose. It is typically pierced using a labret stud as jewelry, with the ball sitting outside the mouth in the dip of the top lip.

A variation of the philtrum piercing is a jestrum, where the piercing is placed vertically through the lip using a curved barbell so both beads are visible. The other variation is called double because it features two pierced spots in a line.
