= Jestrum piercing =

Upper lip piercing

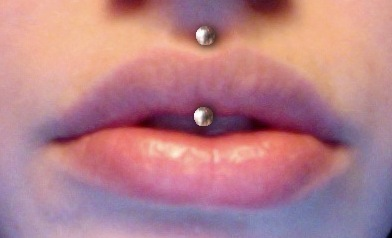
- Nicknames: Vertical medusa
- Location: Philtrum

A jestrum piercing, also known as a vertical medusa or vertical philtrum, is an upper lip piercing that is very similar to a labret piercing, or more specifically a vertical labret piercing. It is placed in the philtrum of the upper lip, directly under the nasal septum. Unlike the similar medusa piercing, a jestrum piercing uses a curved bar-bell, and both ends of the piercing are visible externally with the lower part of the bar-bell curving around the underside of the upper lip. Sometimes it is combined with a lower labret piercing to form a symmetrical look.
