= Surface piercing =

Type of piercing

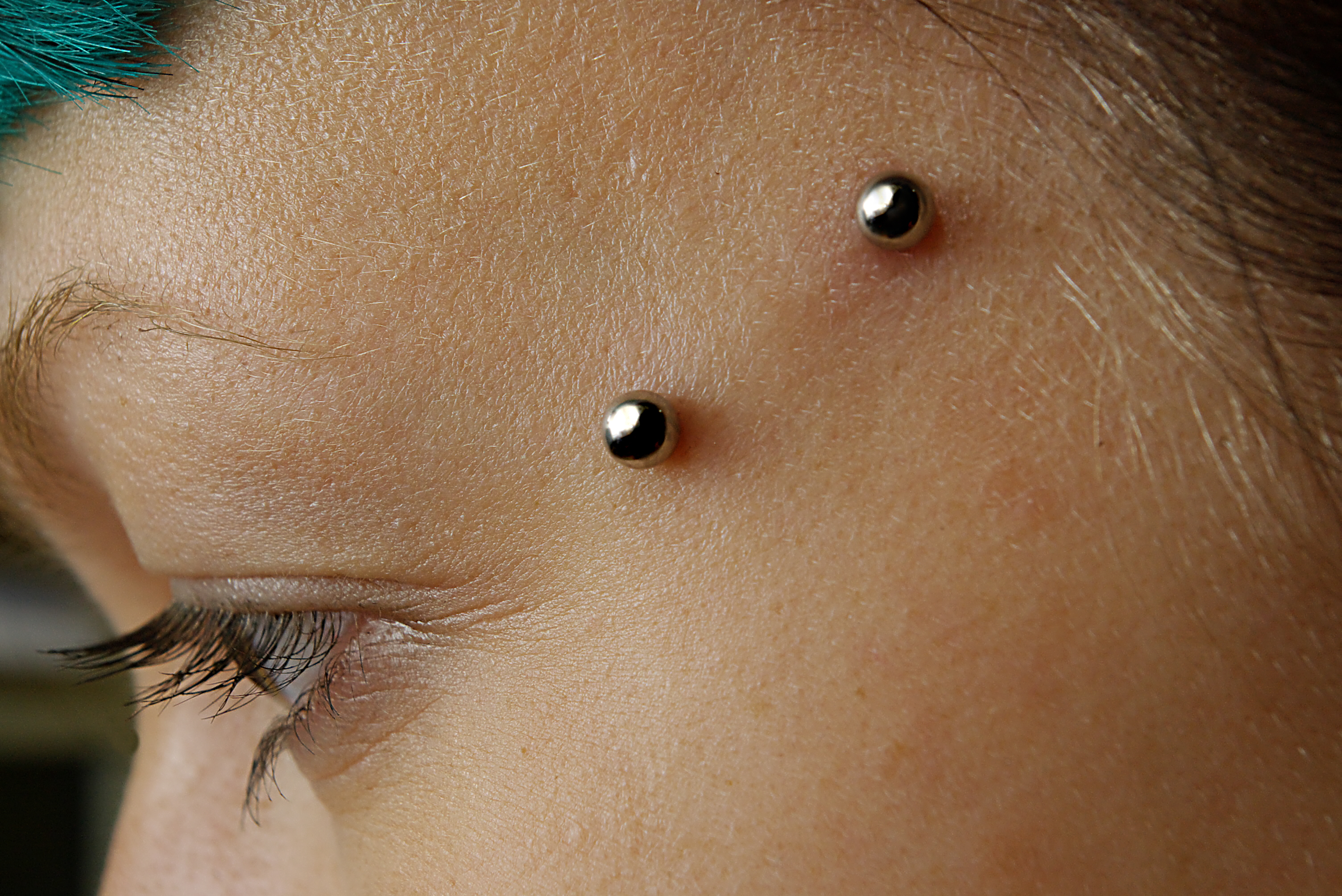
This anti-eyebrow piercing is an example of a surface piercing

Surface piercings are piercings that are found on flat parts of the body, giving a double-pierced look that sits flat against the skin. A surface bar follows the plane of skin, while a standard piercing is pierced through the plane. Standard piercings have an entrance hole with an exit hole that is usually directly behind the entrance hole, whereas with a surface piercing the entrance and exit holes are next to each other on the skin surface.

== Types ==
Some examples of surface piercings:

- Corset piercing: a series of bilaterally symmetrical piercings, normally done on the back, intended to be laced like a corset.
- Christina piercing: located at the mons pubis.
- Madison piercing: a horizontal piercing located just above the collarbone, at the base of the neck.
- Nape piercing: located on the back of the neck.
- Neck piercing: located on the side of the neck. It is also called "Vampire Bites".
- Hip piercing: located on or beside the hips (on the pelvis near the hips bones).
- Wrist piercing: located on or near the wrist, generally on the upper side.
- Anti-eyebrow: located under or beside the eye.
- Bridge piercing: located horizontally at the bridge of the nose.
- Pubic piercing: located in the area/ pubic bone for both men and women.
- Belly button piercing: located around or through a part of the navel
- Eyebrow piercing: this goes through the eyebrow or through the skin around the eyebrow.

== Rejection and migration ==
Surface piercings can be difficult to heal. They are the most likely to be rejected as they only break through small amounts of skin. This leaves less skin to keep the piercing secure. The body will push it to the surface of the skin causing it to "grow out". Proper placement and jewelry selection by an experienced body piercer can help alleviate this problem. A healed surface piercing can last from a few months to a lifetime.
