= Cheek piercing =

Type of body piercing

Cheek Piercing
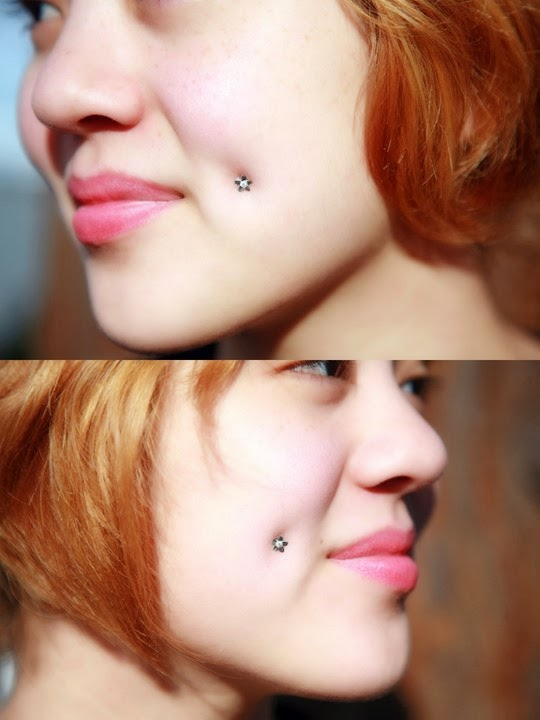
- Jewelry: Labret
- Healing: 6 months minimum; can take up to a year.

Cheek piercing (also known as a dimple) is a facial body piercing through the cheek. The most common variation of the cheek piercing penetrates the facial tissue into the oral cavity. The usual placement is symmetrical on either side of the face, either penetrating (and enhancing) or imitating dimples.

The piercing can cause nerve damage and may leak or secrete lymph fluid, which has a saliva-like texture and can create an unpleasant odor. An alternative is microdermal implants, placed in the intended dimple location. This method avoids drawbacks of full cheek piercings. Though microdermals do have a slightly larger chance to leave a scar than a piercing, they will heal eventually and be almost unnoticeable. The rate of infection is also lower in the long run. Because the piercing does not penetrate the cheek completely, there is little to no chance of tooth or gum damage. Microdermals are like a 'one hole' piercing, where the 'foot' of the jewelry sits below the skin and the decorative jewel or flat disc is above the skin.

== Jewelry ==
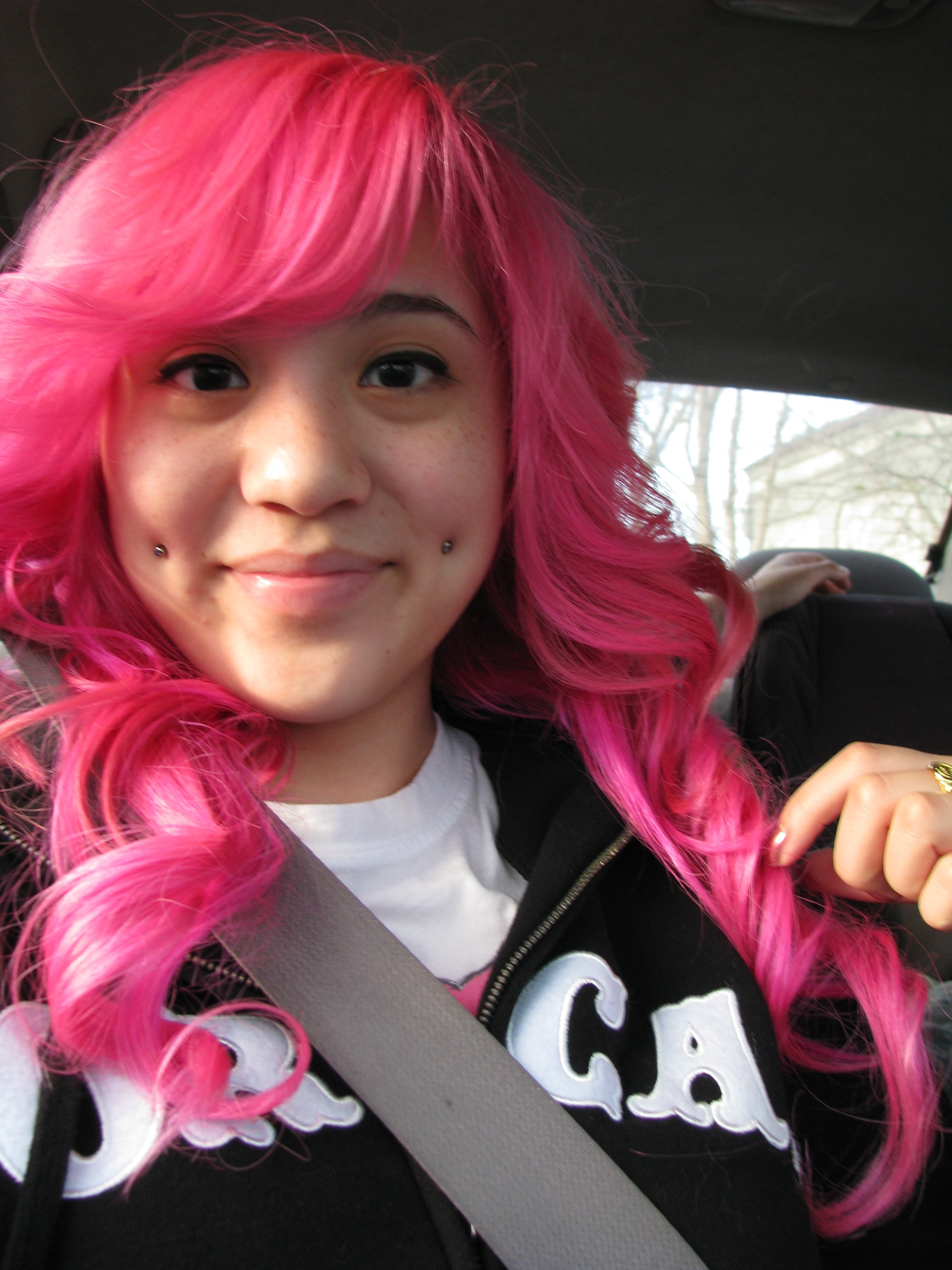
Deep artificial dimples

Cheek piercings are sometimes pierced with 1.6mm flat backed labret studs, but is mostly done with a regular barbell so the cheek tissues do not grow over the back of the jewelry. Also, so the wearer doesn't accidentally break/crack the jewelry by means of unintentional biting. The flat back provides comfort and lessens the chance of the jewelry damaging the teeth and gums of the wearer. However it proves problematic during the healing process because the cheek will likely heal over the flat back if the bar's length is too short. In this case, the piercer will have to cut the barbell out from the inside of the mouth. The cheek is pierced with a 22 – 24 mm labret/barbell during the procedure. This will accommodate for swelling. After the piercing is healed, shortened jewelry further reduces the chance of damage to the teeth from unintentional biting.

== History and culture ==
Cheek piercing at a ritual in Qionghai, Hainan, China

Permanent cheek piercing appears to be of primarily contemporary origin.

Ritual cheek piercings were and are common throughout the world in both primitive and modern cultures. Perhaps the most well known of these rituals is the annual vegetarian festivals in Phuket, Thailand where "mediums" (both lay people and monks) pierce their cheeks with an array of objects in varying sizes, while in an altered state.
