= Nape piercing =

Piercing through the back of the neck

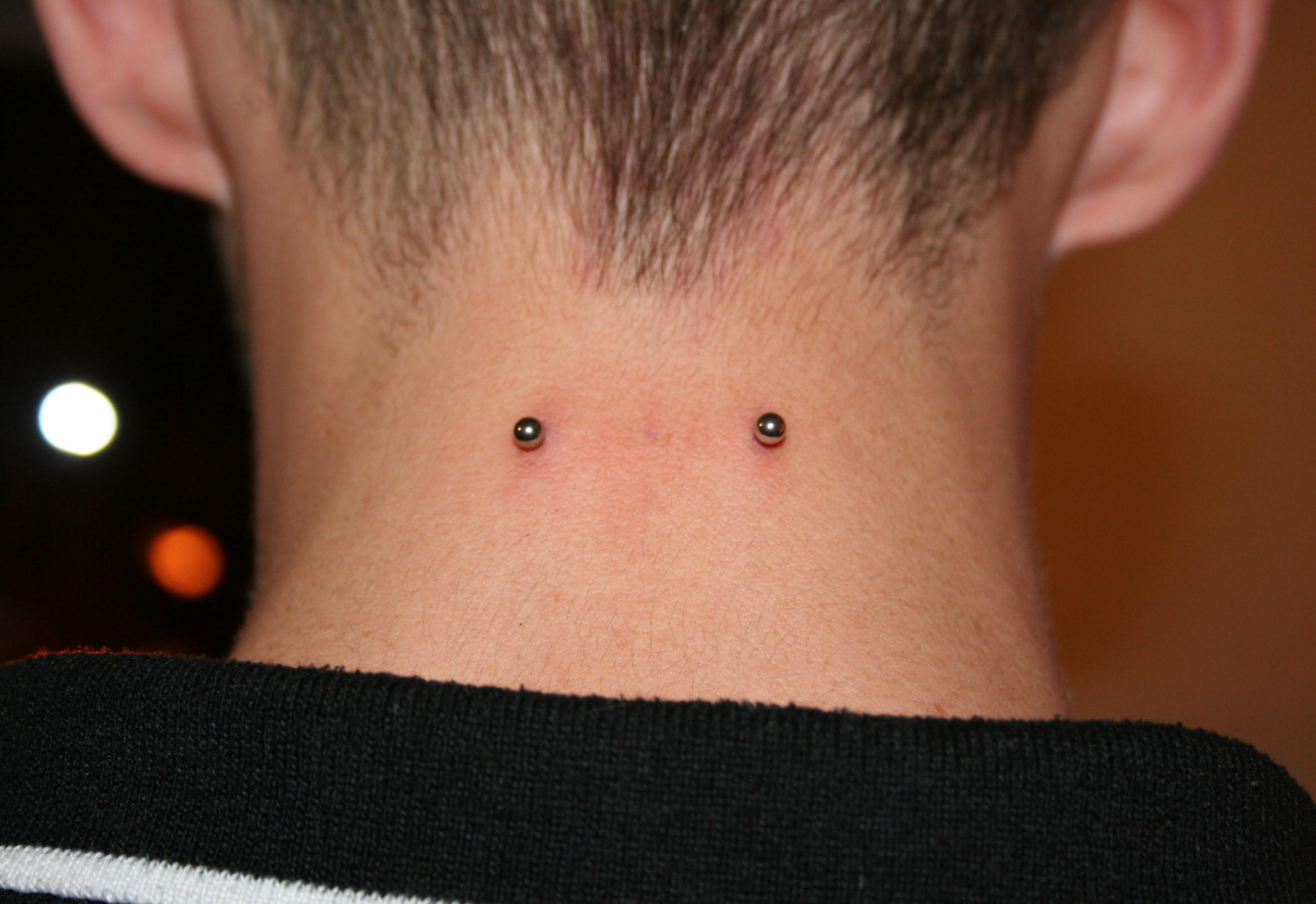
- Location: Nape of the neck
- Jewelry: Barbell, surface bar
- Healing: 3 Months to a year

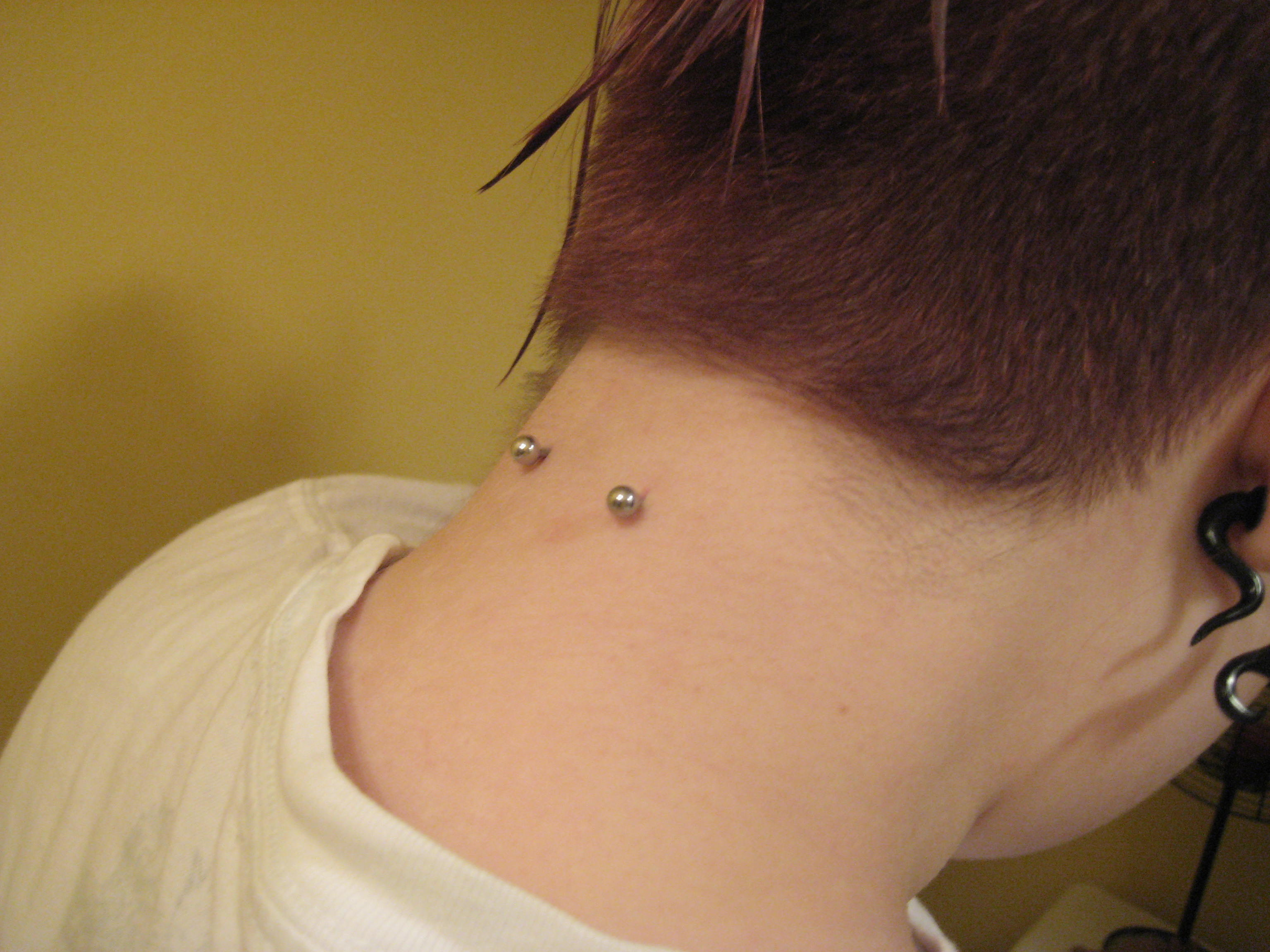
A nape piercing

A nape piercing is a piercing through the surface of the nape (back part) of the neck. Nape piercings are a type of surface piercing. They carry a high rate of rejection and migration, unless they are properly measured and placed. They may reject if they are not pierced properly, as they are in a part of the body that moves constantly and are easy to irritate, catching on clothing or other objects.

Being surface piercings, nape piercings require special jewelry to minimize the risk of piercing migration and rejection. Both surface bars and barbells with bars made from flexible material, such as tygon or teflon, are commonly used as both initial and long term jewelry in nape piercings. More appropriate is titanium, which, due to lack of nickel, is less prone to irritation of surrounding skin. For most surface nape piercings, a quality piercing is done in two steps with different bars, one with long rises (used at time of piercing) to allow for initial swelling, and the second bar (shorter rises with balls a few mm from skin) to be inserted months later once most (if not all) healing has taken place. Other similar jewelry include specially made and bent barbells.

Somewhat less common are surface anchors, commonly made from surgical implant-grade titanium. A surface anchor has two parts: a base or foot which is inserted under the dermis during the piercing process and which incorporates a stem exposed to the surface, and a decorative disc or ball of jewelry which typically appears flush with the surface of the skin. Surface anchor nape piercings are most commonly found placed symmetrically on either side of the spine at the nape.

== History and culture ==
Nape piercings, like most surface piercings, are of completely contemporary origin. Numerous urban legends and popular culture myths associate nape piercings with a potential for spinal or nerve damage, due to their location. Nape piercings do not interact with nerve tissue more or less than any other surface piercing, and there is no risk of nerve damage associated with nape piercings.
