= Navel piercing =

Type of piercing located in, or around, the navel

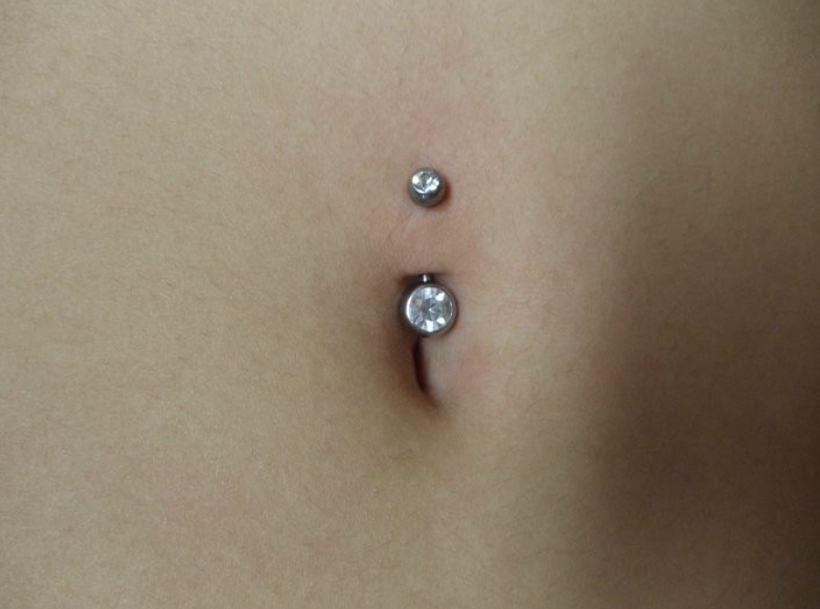
- Nicknames: Belly button piercing; belly piercing
- Location: Navel
- Jewelry: Barbell; captive bead ring
- Healing: 6–12+ months

A navel piercing, also referred to as a belly button piercing, is a type of body piercing that penetrates the skin of the navel. It is typically done by piercing the rim of skin around the navel. It is one of the most common piercings among young people and teenagers, particularly women. A navel piercing typically heals in 6–12 months (one of the slowest healing piercings). However, health conditions such as being overweight or diabetes can affect the healing time.

== History ==
The history of navel piercing has been misrepresented, as many of the myths promulgated by Doug Malloy in the pamphlet Body & Genital Piercing in Brief continue to be reprinted. For instance, according to Malloy's colleague Jim Ward, Malloy alleged that navel piercing was popular among ancient Egyptian aristocrats and was depicted in Egyptian statuary, an allegation that is widely repeated. However, other sources deny that the historical record supports the allegation.

The navel piercing first became popular in the early 1970s among the punk subculture, who were beginning to experiment with piercing parts of their bodies. The first pierced navels most likely belonged to men and were adorned with masculine jewelry such as plugs or barbells.

== Present ==
Once taboo, the navel piercing is one of the most prevalent body piercings today. Pop culture has played a large role in the promotion of the piercing. The navel piercing first hit the mainstream when models Christy Turlington and Naomi Campbell revealed their recently pierced navels at a London fashion show in 1993. The popularization of the piercing, however, is accredited to the 1993 Aerosmith music video for their song "Cryin' ", wherein Alicia Silverstone has her navel pierced by body piercer Paul King.

A screenshot of Alicia Silverstone's character getting a navel piercing in the music video for Aerosmith's "Cryin' "

While the popularity of the navel piercing increased during the 1990s, Britney Spears also contributed to the prevalence of navel piercings after prominently displaying the piercing in her album ...Baby One More Time and at the 2001 MTV Video Music Awards. This is demonstrated by a 2005 survey of 10,503 people in the United Kingdom where 33% of the respondents had navel piercings making it the top body piercing site.

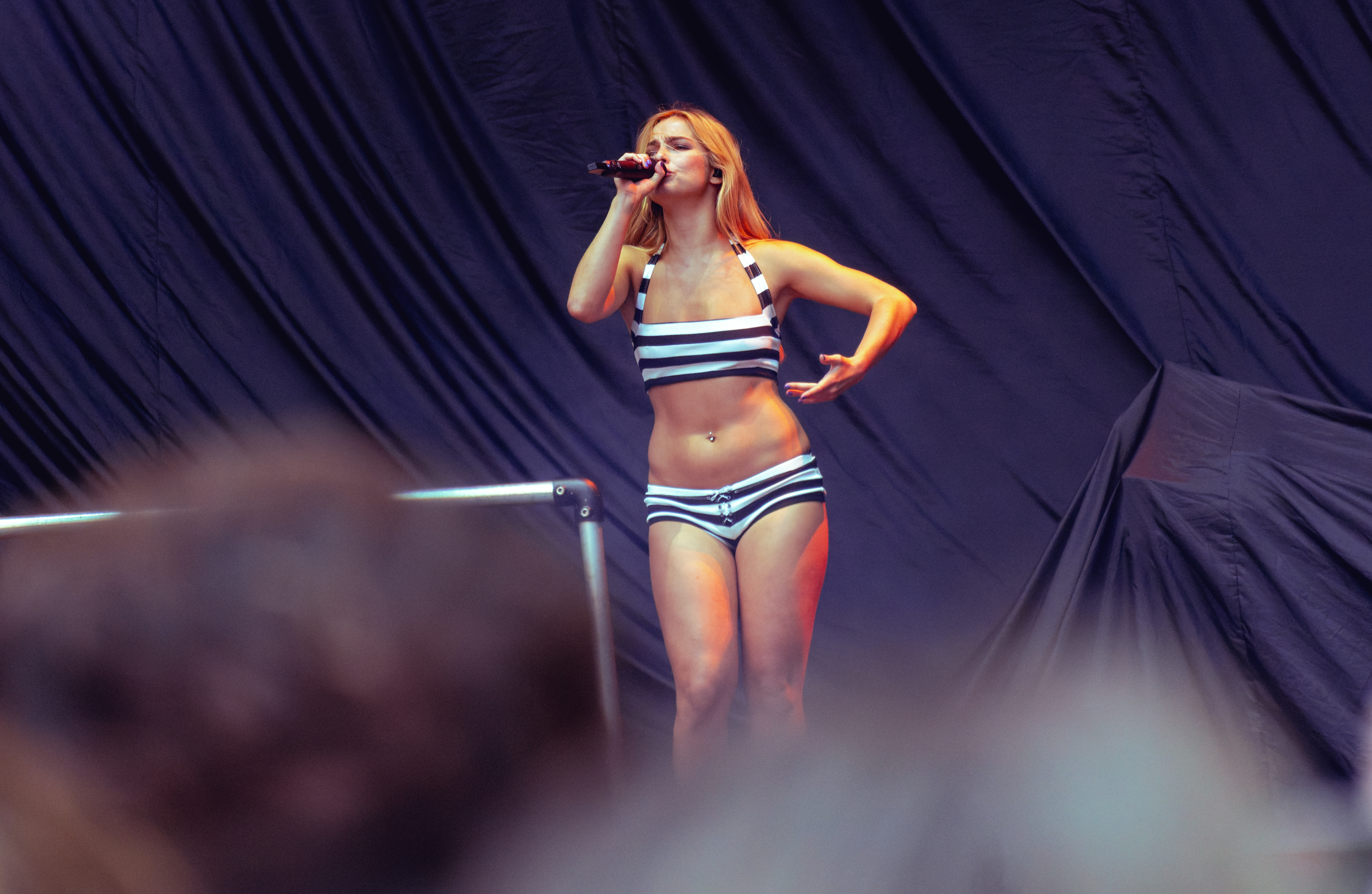
Addison Rae wearing a navel piercing at the Wembley Stadium in July 2025

Navel piercings subsequently declined in popularity in the 2010s, however, Generation Z celebrities including Addison Rae, Doja Cat, Tyla, Normani, Dua Lipa and Billie Eilish have helped to revitalize navel piercings in the 2020s. While Millennial celebrities such as Vanessa Hudgens and Miley Cyrus continued to wear their navel piercings, a comeback of the piercing was also signaled by Kim Kardashian who re-pierced her navel in 2024.

A 2022 study found that women are primarily motivated to pierce their navels due to a desire to enhance body image and that a navel piercing can, in turn, significantly improve bodily self-perception. The study further found that navel piercings become strongly, and beneficially, integrated into women's bodily self-image and that the piercing may be seen as an expression of care that can help reduce self-harming thoughts and behavior.

== Jewelry ==
The jewelry used in navel piercing is commonly called "belly rings". Belly rings are a midriff version of earrings.

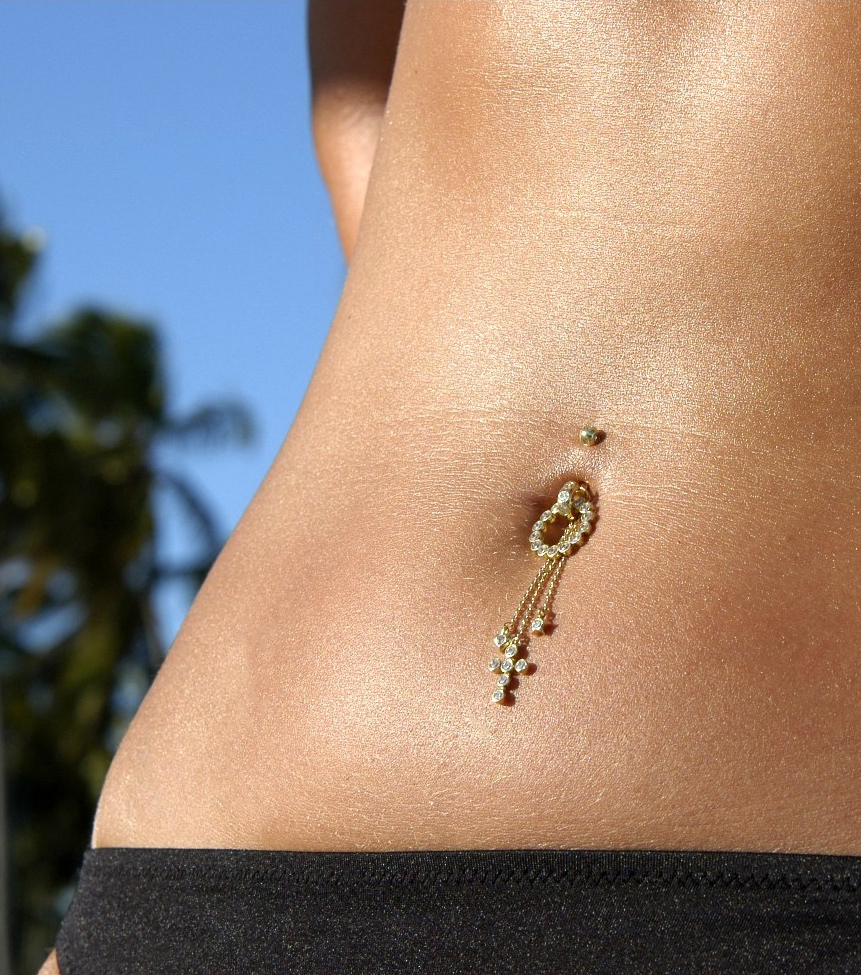
Dangle navel jewelry

Many new designs, such as the ancient Bali jewelry designs, have been added to modern navel cultures. Curved barbells remains the most commonly used jewelry, although captive bead rings, and other rings are popular as well, but due to the amount of movement in this area and the common complication of swelling, they are not recommended. The world's first huggy was designed and patented by TummyToys belly rings. Vogue published an article in 2015 about the circular captive bead belly rings and TummyToys snap lock clasps becoming the latest trend for navel piercings. Most kinds of ring or bar jewelry can be worn in a navel piercing. Navels are most often pierced with a 14g curved barbell, which is recommended to be worn until the piercing has completely healed, the healing time is typically anywhere between 6–12 months. A wide variety of embellished jewelry is available for navels – simple curved barbells, captives, TummyToys huggies, flexible PTFE and deluxe long length styles with dangling pendants. Currently, real diamond and solid gold belly rings are also available in a wide range of styles. Most kinds of ring or bar jewelry can be worn in a navel piercing, both for top and bottom piercings.

There has been a special standard established for navel barbells (also called "bananabells" or "bananabars", a reference to their curved shape). The standard barbell is 1.6 mm (1/16 in) thick and 9.5 mm (3/8 in) or 11 mm (7/16 in) long and is most commonly referred to as a 14-gauge post. The silver caps on the barbell post usually measure 5 mm (3/16 inch) in diameter for the upper and 8 mm (5/16 inch) in diameter for the lower.

Although navel bananabells are different from full rings, such as captive bead rings, which can also be worn in navel piercings, online body jewelry retailers and wholesalers tend to refer to these barbells as "belly rings".

A new version of navel jewelry is on the market for those without pierced navels, which is based on the idea of clip-on earrings.

== Risks ==
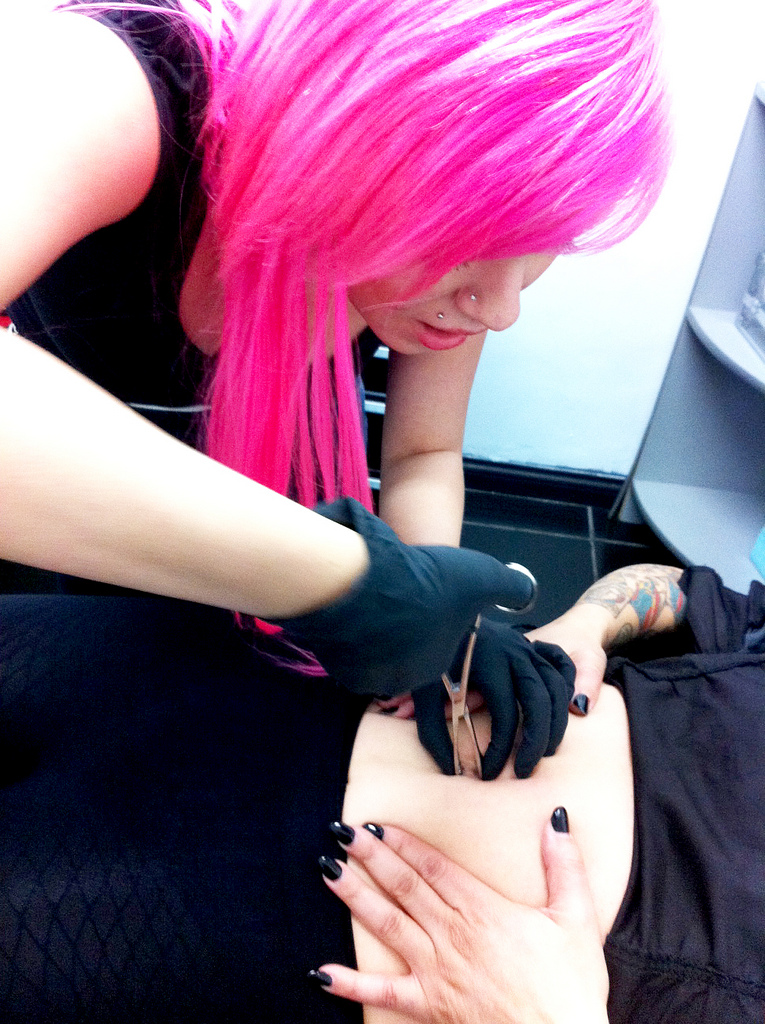
Piercing process with clamp

Navel piercings can be one of the slowest piercings to heal, with healing times ranging from six months to two years.

Navel piercings carry several risks, including:

- Infection: A new piercing may take up to 6–12 months to heal completely, during which time sweat, bacteria, and friction may lead to infection. A piercer cannot diagnose whether a piercing is infected but can give advice and recommend medical care when needed. Infected navel piercings can result in sepsis and possibly death.
- Scarring: Skin tissue rarely heals to match the surrounding tissue. It heals in varying thickness and size. It is likely that any piercing worn for a significant time (months to years) will leave a scar if removed.
- Rejection: Rejection is when the body pushes out a piercing in order for the wound to properly heal. This can happen even if the wearer takes very good care of the navel piercing. There is no way to stop rejection, as it is just the body's natural healing process. It can be prevented, though, by maintaining proper aftercare, preventing it from getting pulled at or tugged on, and being pierced in the correct spot by a reputable piercer. If rejection occurs, the jewelry should be removed as soon as feasible to minimize the scarring.
- Migration: Migration can happen due to a variety of reasons. It may be due to the amount of movement in the area which pushed the piercing to a spot where it would be easier to heal. Trauma from pulling or tugging on the piercing could have added excess scar tissue, or it was improperly pierced, making the body push it to a more comfortable spot.

== Type of navel piercings ==
Navel piercings come in all colors and various types, including;

- Lower Navel Piercing: This is done in the skin fold below the navel; It is less common and usually done when a moderately large jewelry piece is desired.
- Double Navel piercing: This is a combination of the lower and upper navel piercings.
- Side Navel Piercing: It is done on both sides of the navel.
- Quad Navel Piercing: This is the piercing of the 4 hemispheres of the navel
- Diagonal Navel Piercing: It is done diagonally
- True Navel Piercing (or Outie Piercing): This is a rare piercing, as only 2% of the world's population has an external navel. It is performed on the existing protruding navel. It should be done by a professional and entails risk.
- Dangle Belly Ring: The added weight can cause complications.

== Types ==
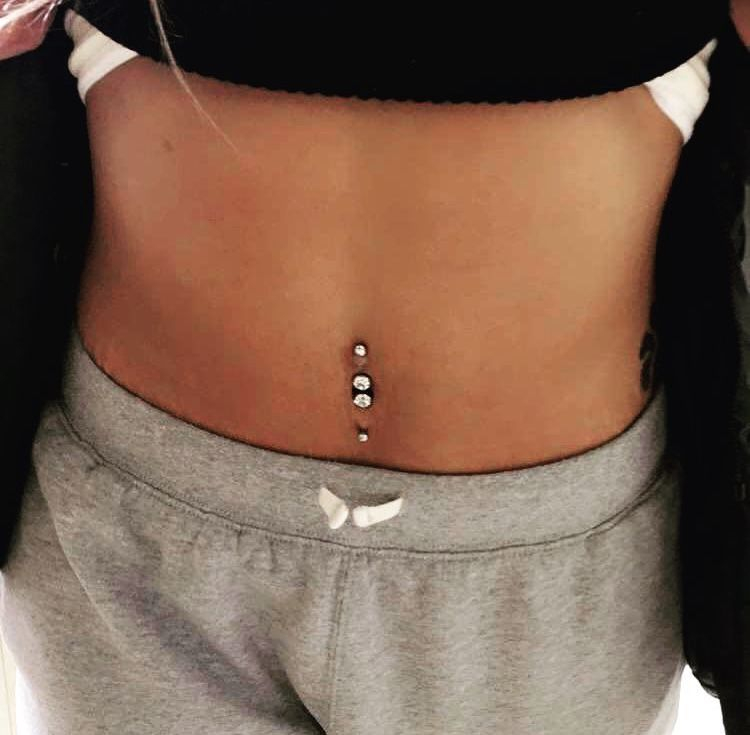
Double Navel Piercing

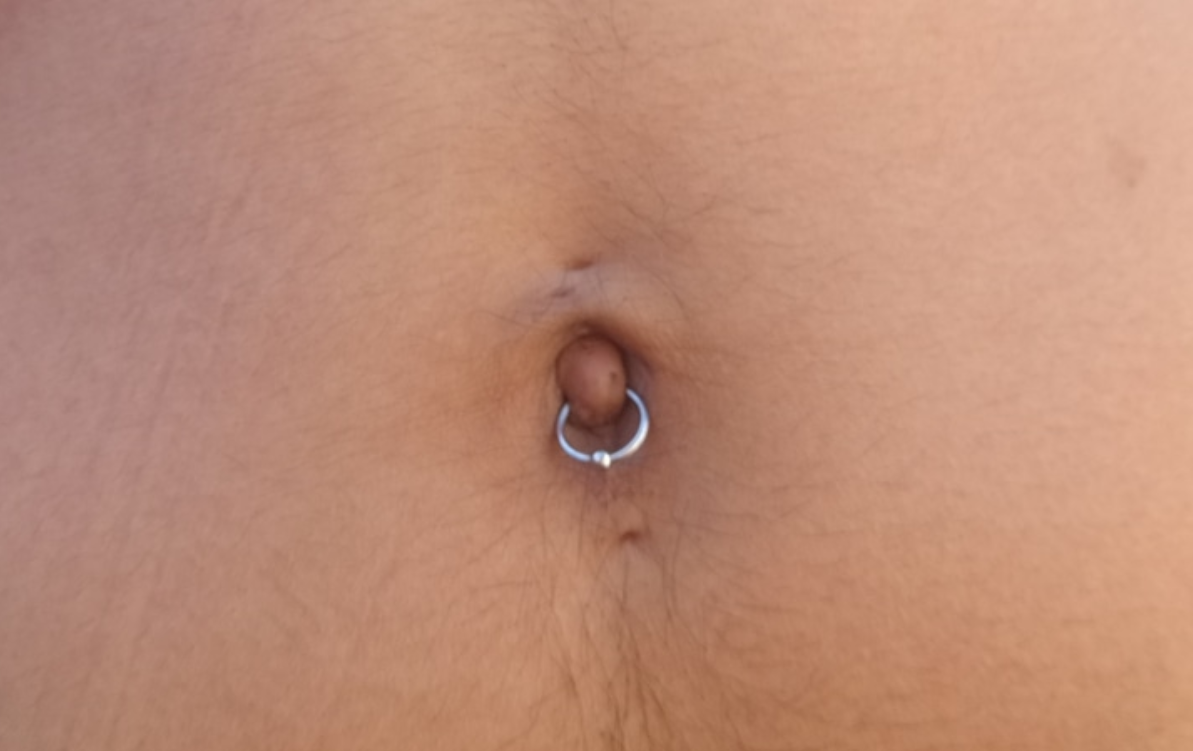
True Navel Piercing

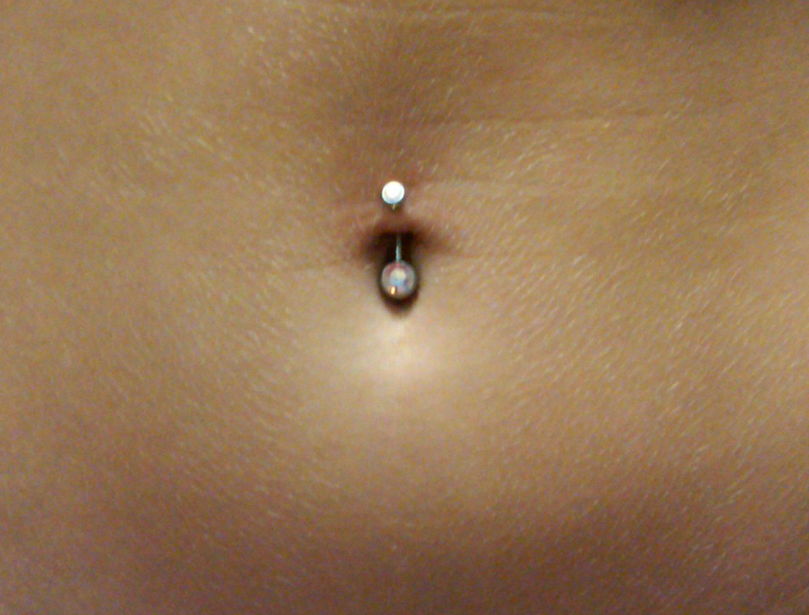
Standard Navel Piercing

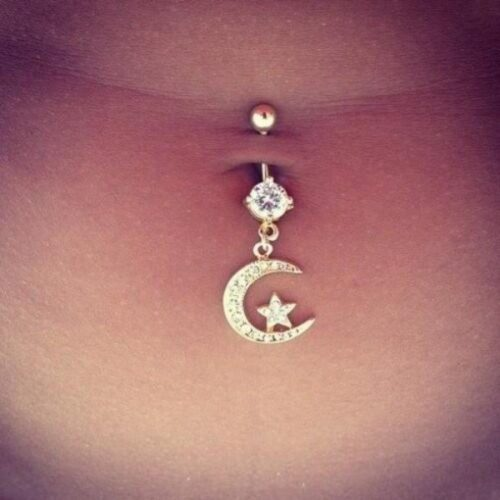
Navel with dangle

== Bibliography ==
- Bone, Angie; Fortune Ncube; Tom Nichols; Norman D Noah (June 21, 2008). "Body Piercing in England: a Survey of Piercing at Sites Other than Earlobe". British Medical Journal. 336 (7658): 1426–1428. doi:10.1136/bmj.39580.497176.25. PMC 2432173. PMID 18556275.
- Miller, Jean-Chris (2004). The Body Art Book. Penguin. ISBN 0-425-19726-3.
