= Tygon tubing =

Family of flexible polymer tubing

Tygon logo

Tygon is a brand name for a family of flexible polymer tubing consisting of a variety of materials to be used "across a range of specialized fluid transfer requirements". The specific composition of each type is a trade secret. Some variants have multiple layers of different materials. Tygon is a registered trademark of Saint-Gobain Corporation. It is an invented word, owned and used by Saint-Gobain and originated in the late 1930s. Tygon products are produced in three countries, but sold throughout the world. Tygon tubing is used in many markets, including food and beverage, chemical processing, industrial, laboratory, medical, pharmaceutical, and semiconductor processing. There are many formulations of clear, flexible, Tygon tubing. The chemical resistance and physical properties vary among the different formulations, but the tubing generally is intended to be "so resistant to chemical attack that it will handle practically any chemical", whether liquid, gas, or slurry. While largely non-reactive, Tygon has been reported to liberate carbon monoxide and is listed among carbon monoxide-releasing molecules.

== Formulations and applications ==
=== Food and beverage applications ===
Tygon B-44-3, Tygon B-44-4X, Tygon B-44-4X I.B., and Tygon Silver (antimicrobial) were widely used in the food and beverage industry, in particular in: beverage dispensing, dairy processing, soft-serve dispensing, vitamin and flavor concentrate systems, cosmetic production, and water purification systems. These formulations each meet U.S. Food and Drug Administration 3-A and NSF International 51 criteria but they do not comply with European Directives (European Directive 2002/72/EC of 6 August 2002 relating to plastic materials and articles intended to come into contact with foodstuffs as modified in particular by Directive 2007/19/EC of 2 April 2007).

=== Class VI approved ===
Several formulations of Tygon are USP class VI approved and can be used in either surgical procedures or pharmaceutical processing.

==== Medical ====
Tygon Medical/Surgical Tubing S-50-HL — Characterized to the latest ISO 10993 standards and U.S. Food and Drug Administration (FDA) guidelines for biocompatibility. This material is non-toxic, non-hemolytic, and non-pyrogenic. This formulation is used in minimally invasive devices, dialysis equipment, for bypass procedures, and chemotherapy drug delivery.

Tygon Medical Tubing S-54-HL was introduced in 1964 for use in medical applications. This material can be used in catheters, for intravenous or intra-arterial infusion and other surgical uses. Tygon S-54-HL can also be fabricated into cannulae or protective sheath products using thermoforming and flaring techniques.

==== Pharmaceutical ====
Tygon LFL (Long Flex Life) pump tubing is non-toxic clear tubing with broad chemical resistance. It is often used in product filtration and fermentation and surfactant delivery.

Tygon 2275 High Purity Tubing is a plasticizer-free material that is often used in sterile filling and dispensing systems and diagnostic equipment. This formulation is also considered to have low absorption/adsorption properties, which minimizes the risk of fluid alteration.

Tygon 2275 I.B. High-Purity Pressure Tubing is plasticizer-free and is reinforced with a braid for use with elevated working pressures.

=== Peristaltic pumps ===
Many formulations of Tygon can be used in peristaltic pumps, including the following:

Tygon R-3603 Laboratory Tubing is commonly used in chemical laboratories. It is often used in incubators and as a replacement for rubber tubing for Bunsen burners. This material is produced in vacuum sizes and can withstand a full vacuum at room temperature. It is a thermoplastic PVC-based material with plasticizer.

Tygon R-1000 Ultra-Soft Tubing is used in general laboratory applications. It is the softest of the Tygon formulations with a durometer hardness of Shore A 40 (ASTM Method D2240-02). Because of the low durometer of this material it is often used in low-torque peristaltic pumps.

Tygon LFL (Long Flex Life) Pump Tubing, Tygon 3350, Tygon S-50-HL Medical/Surgical Tubing, Tygon 2275 High Purity Tubing, and Tygon 2001 Tubing are also used in peristaltic pump applications.

=== Plasticizer-free/non-DEHP ===
Tygon tubing is available in Plasticizer-free/non-DEHP (non-Phthalate)-formulations. These formulations have a high degree of chemical resistance and do not release any hazardous material when properly incinerated. Tygon 2275 High Purity tubing, Tygon Ultra Chemical Resistant Tubing 2075, and Tygon Plasticizer Free Tubing 2001 are all plasticizer-free. "ND-100 series" products are non-DEHP and use a non-Phthalate plasticizer.

Tygon Silver Tubing has a plasticizer-free inner bore and a silver-based compound on the inner surface to decrease bacterial growth and protect against microbes.

=== Industrial use ===
There are several formulations of Tygon that are used in industrial applications.

- Tygon Fuel and Lubricant Tubing F-4040-A is translucent yellow for positive identification and flow monitoring. It is used in small engine fuel lines, recreational vehicles, and lubrication lines.
- Tygon LP1100 is a low permeation EPA and CARB certified fuel line also used in small engines.
- Tygon R-3400 UV Resistant Tubing is black in color and opaque. It remains flexible in ultraviolet (UV) environments and is often used for electrical insulation, ink, and adhesive dispensing, and fertilizer and pesticide dispensing. Because it is resistant to UV light, ozone, and weathering, it is commonly used in outdoor applications.
- Tygon 2075 Ultra Chemical Resistant Tubing is a plasticizer-free material that is known for its high degree of chemical resistance. It can be used in ink and printing fluid dispensing, paint and solvent production, and is resistant to MEK and other chemicals. When properly incinerated it releases only carbon dioxide and water.
- Tygon 2375 Ultra Chemical Resistant Tubing is now replacing Tygon 2075.
