= Barbell (piercing) =

Type of piercing

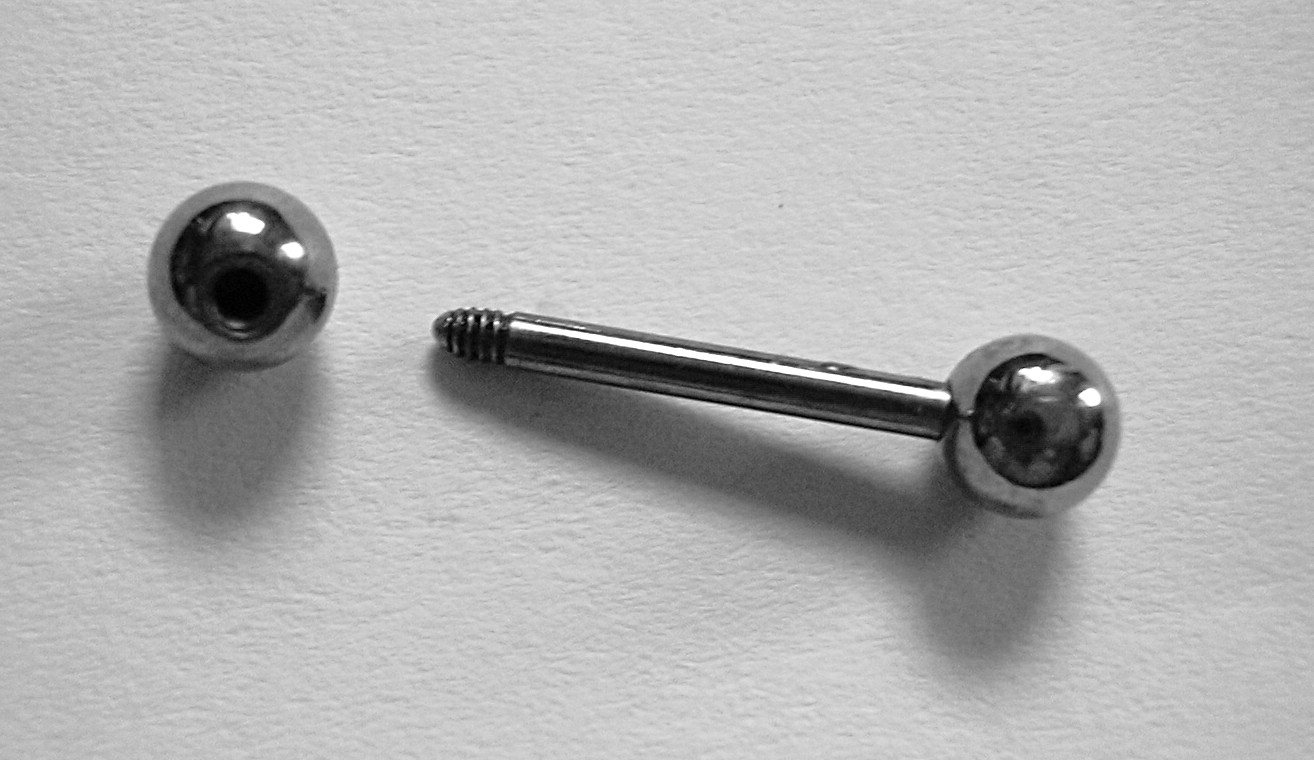
Externally threaded barbell

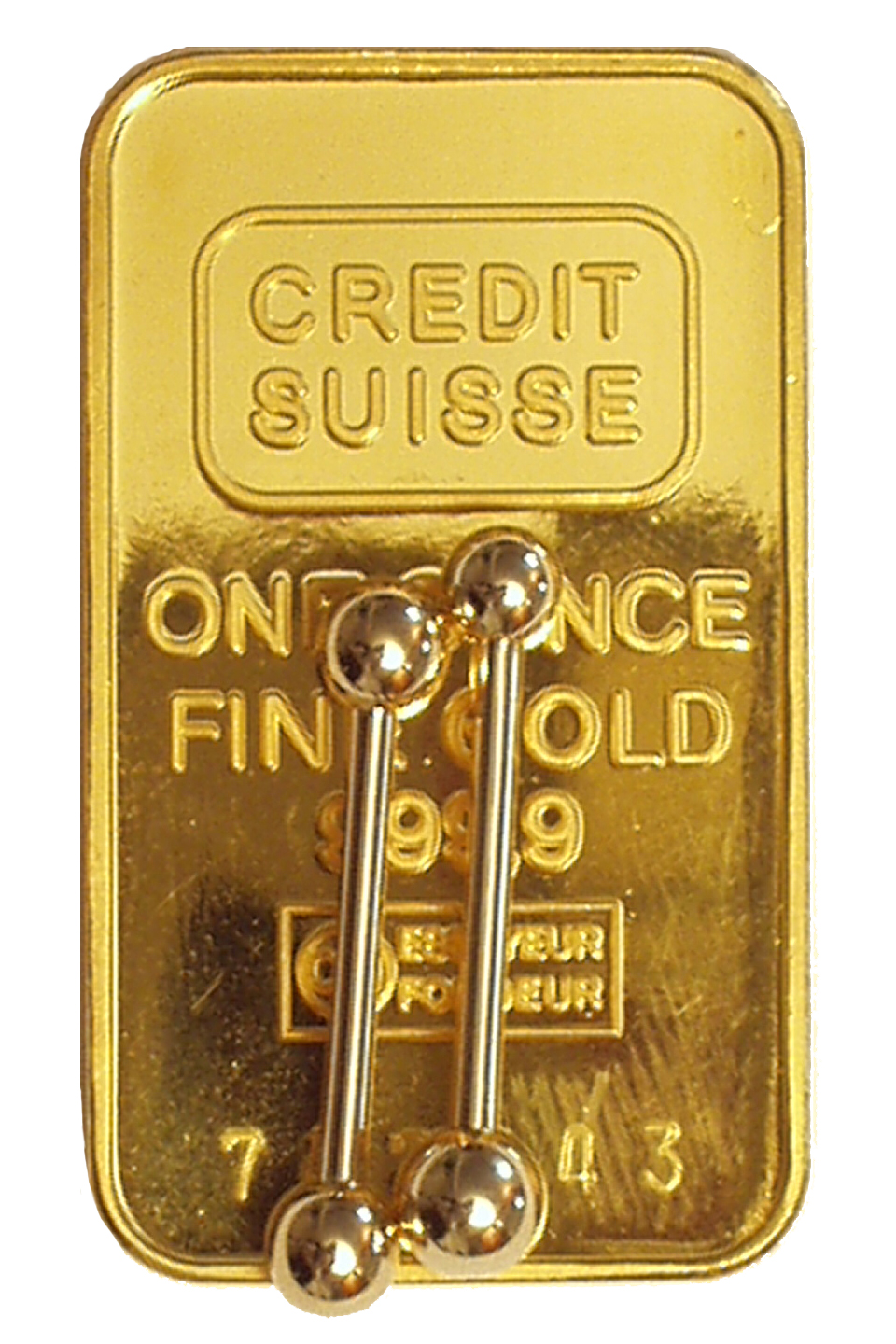
14K gold barbells in front of 24K gold for color comparison

Barbell style piercing jewelry is composed of a straight bar with a bead on each end, one or both beads unscrewable for removal and/or changing of the beads. Often one of the beads is fixed, either via epoxy or welding, so that only one bead is used to install or remove the jewelry. Barbell threads are usually right-handed.

They are so named because they resemble the barbells that are used in weightlifting.

== Types of barbells ==
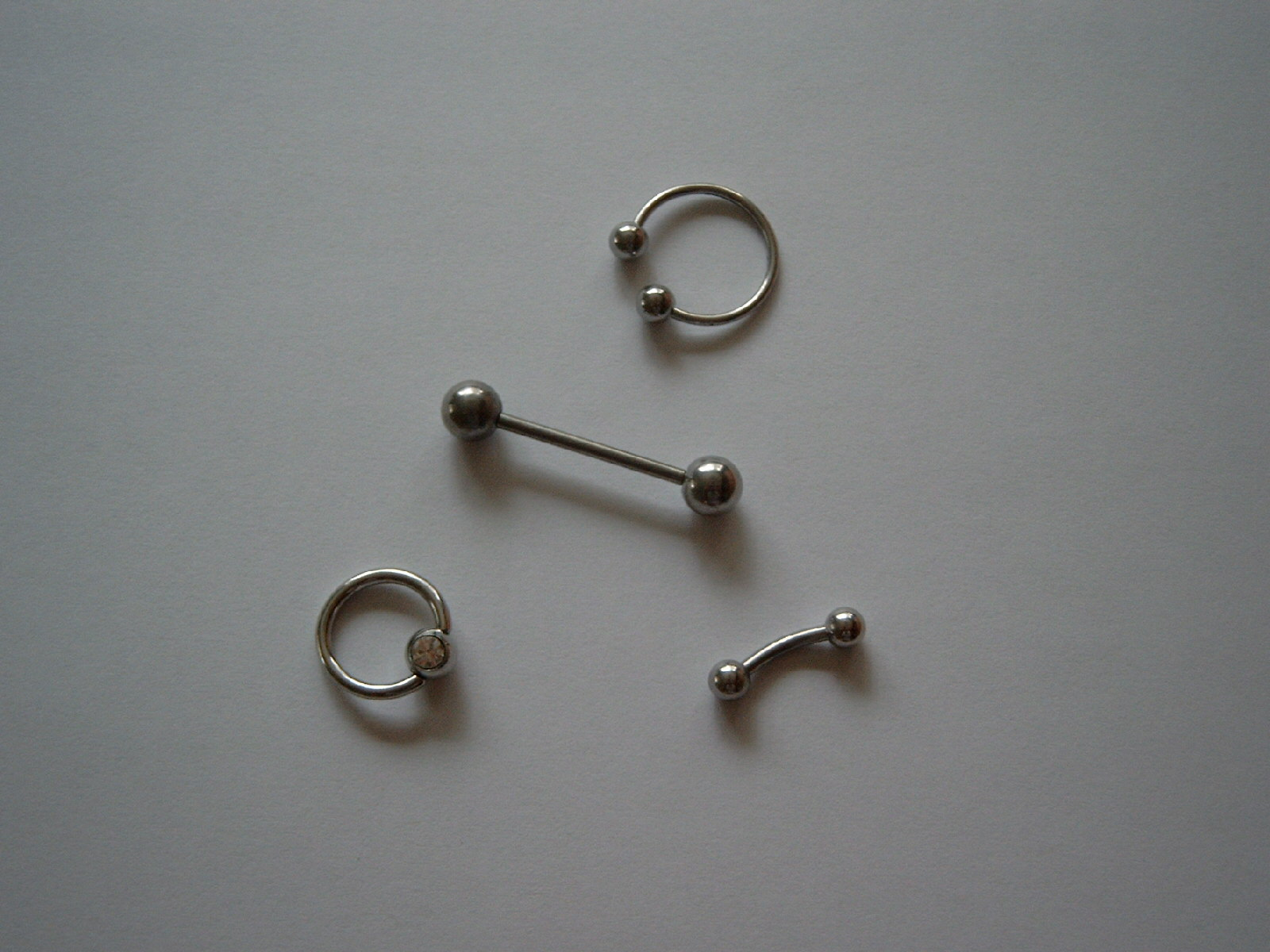
Circular barbell, barbell, captive bead ring and curved barbell

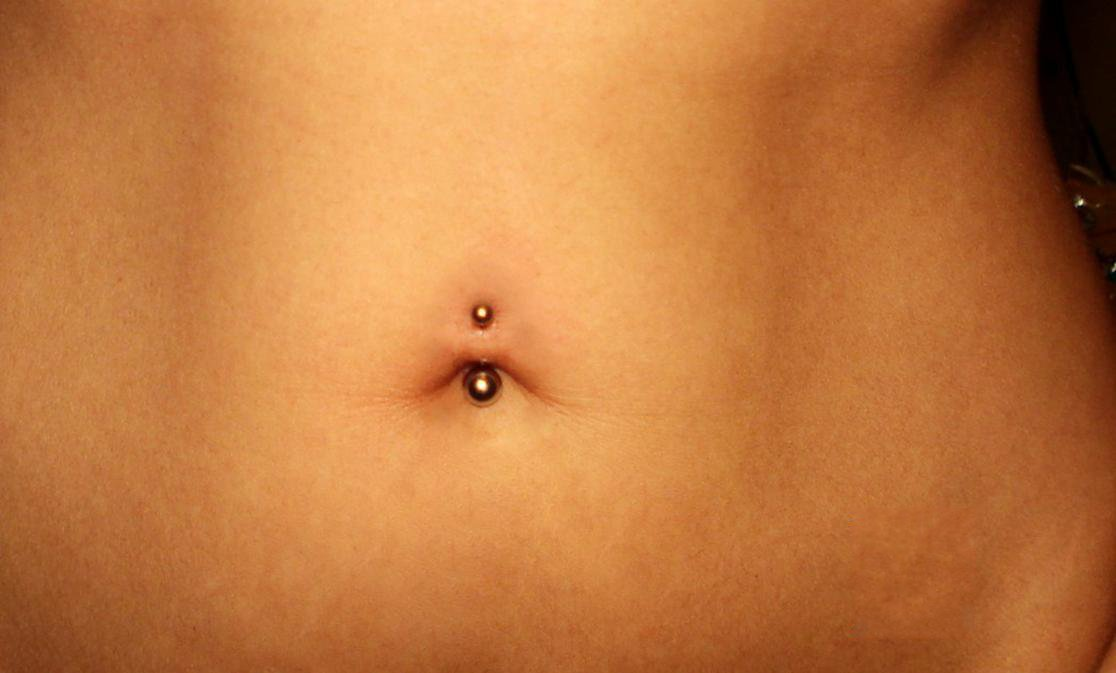
Barbell used for navel piercing

=== Internally threaded barbells ===
Named because the bar has smooth ends with receiving threads tapped into the end of the bar. In internally threaded jewelry, the bead has a receiving tube machined into it (this is referred to as "countersunk"), with a threaded post extending from the center, which mates with the threaded receiving tube on the bar. Being much less likely to cause damage and irritation, especially at the time of piercing, internally threaded jewelry is considered superior to externally threaded jewelry. It is usually slightly more expensive than externally threaded jewelry, due to the extra machining and labor involved.

=== Externally threaded barbells ===
So named because the shaft of the bar has threads at both ends to allow beads with receiving threads to be attached. Due to the potential damage or irritation to the piercing as the threads are passed through when the jewelry is inserted or removed as well as the popularity of the internally threaded barbell, the externally threaded option has become less common. This type of barbell is usually only used in cheap, mass-produced body jewelry. Some manufacturers make externally threaded barbells with "step-down threading", where the threaded section has a smaller diameter than the wearable section; these are fairly uncommon and usually internally threaded barbells are used in their place. Step-down threaded jewelry ends can be inserted into the blunt end of a hollow piercing needle, allowing for less irritation during initial placement than regular external barbells.

=== Curved barbells ===
Also known as a navel curve or curve, so named because of their curvature. A curved barbell is mechanically identical to a straight barbell, except for being curved. Curvature on a curved barbell can range from almost straight to circular, with some barbells actually being spiral, with the ends overlapping but separated to allow the insertion of the jewelry. A variation on this design is a J-bar, a slightly curved barbell (sometimes referred to as a bananabell or banana barbell) with a 90 degree bend near one end, used in vertical navel piercings to position the decorative end of the jewelry more appropriately. They can be either internally threaded or externally threaded.

=== Circular barbells ===
Also known as horseshoe barbells due to their shape, they are used in any number of piercings, including earlobes, tragus piercings, nasal septum piercings, or even horizontal clitoral hood piercings, although the latter is less common, as the clitoris is deprived of the stimulation gained from a properly positioned captive bead ring.

=== Surface bars ===
Used in surface piercings. A surface bar is a barbell where the bar has a pair of 90 degree bends, in the same direction (similar to a staple), to allow the jewelry to be used for surface piercings. This design minimizes the pressure that would be caused by other jewelry designs that contribute to rejection in healing surface piercings. Surface bars are produced with many different lengths between the two points.

== Types of beads ==
Beads for barbells can vary widely in design and appearance, although the vast majority of beads are simply spherical in design. That being said, any shape that threads can be tapped into can be used as a bead. Cubes, triangles, cylinders, cones, disks, and other basic shapes are common alternative bead designs. Some large gauge barbells, especially those used in tongue piercings, use "smartie beads", flattened circular beads, to prevent the jewelry from damaging the gums and teeth and allowing free movement of the tongue. There also exist "bondage" beads, which are dimpled to accept a captive bead ring, or the "koosh" bead which is a bead made of a rubbery material textured like a French tickler condom threaded to fit the tip of a barbell. Miniature vibrators also exist, in a variety of hard or soft materials on the exterior of the bead.

== Materials ==
Barbell style jewelry can and is made from any metal appropriate for making body jewellery. Flexible barbells made from Teflon or tygon tubing are often used in experimental surface or deep tissue piercings. Beads do not penetrate the body, so often materials not usually considered safe for piercing can be used in a decorative manner such as acrylic, glass, or organic materials.

== History and culture ==
There are examples of externally threaded, straight barbells being used by tribal people, most notably the Dayak of Borneo. In contemporary society, barbell-style jewelry was popularized by Jim Ward, founder of Gauntlet (the first body piercing studio in the United States), in the 1970s. He was introduced to barbell-style jewelry by Horst Streckenbach "Tattoo Samy" (1926–2001), a tattooist and piercer from Frankfurt, Germany, and his student Manfred "Piker" Kohrs from Hanover, Germany.

"The first barbells I recall came from Germany. Doug had made contact with Tattoo Samy, a tattooist and piercer from Frankfurt. Over the years Samy came to the States a number of times and frequently showed up in LA to visit Doug. On one of his first visits he showed us the barbell studs that he used in some piercings. They were internally threaded, a feature that made so much sense that I immediately set out to recreate them for my own customers." Jim Ward and his magazine PFIQ have been crucial in the development of modern body piercing.

They are worn in the cartilage of the ear but they are also worn on the lobe. The lobe is very popular because it can be performed in some countries without parental consent and it is more painless and easy to DIY.
