= Piercing migration =

Body piercing location change

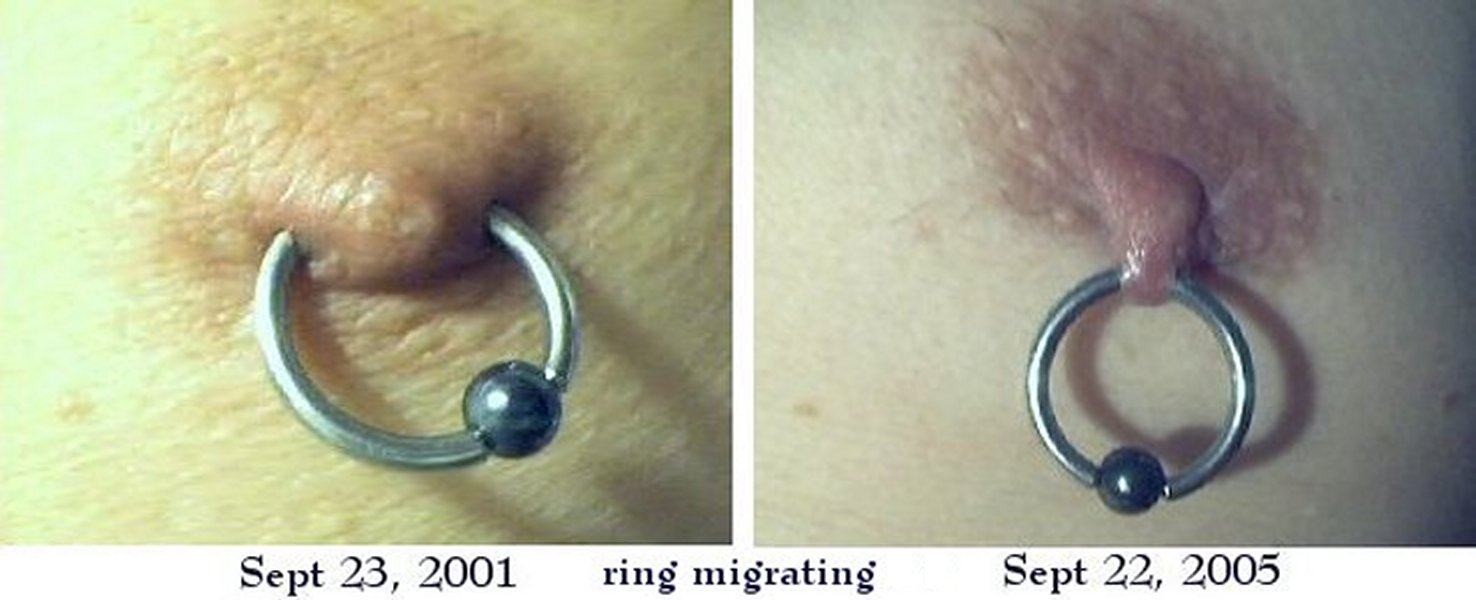
Example nipple ring migration over four years.

Piercing migration is a body piercing's movement from its initial location. Migration may be unnoticed, or painful with progression. It may be slight and brief, or continue until exiting the skin.

== Potential causes and effects of migration ==
Migration varies widely. The most common case is heavy, small gauge earrings moving down until exiting the earlobe after most of a lifetime. It is dubbed the "cheese-cutter effect", because of its similarity to cutting cheese using a fine wire. Contemporary body and ear piercing jewelry mitigates the effect by increasing the weight to gauge ratio. However, migration remains possible, especially with heavy jewelry, even of large gauge.

Another migration cause, though rare, is play or movement affecting the pierced or implanted area, either by causing a wound, or merely stretching the fistula in one direction, thus allowing tissue growth in the void behind. The latter can affect tongue piercings, for example, but neither normally induces exit from the body.

Damage to adjacent tissue can also cause migration. A damaged piercing, much like a fresh one, requires healing of its fistula. Before healing, however, a wound can provide a jewelry migration path, and allow further damage if migration occurs. After healing, the wound can enable migration if the healed tissue is weaker than other, surrounding tissue.

Migration may also be caused by the body rejecting the material that the jewelry is made of. Like a case of a splinter or other foreign object, the body will try to push out foreign material, especially if it irritates the surrounding tissue. Contemporary body jewelry is made from surgical grade implant materials, so with proper aftercare during the healing phase and good hygiene, this is rare.

Pressure, especially the pressure caused by improperly performed surface, navel, and eyebrow piercings often leads to migration. Proper, custom made jewelry can reduce the risk of migration associated with these piercings, although it cannot eliminate it. This type of migration is sometimes accompanied by rejection due to improper drainage due to the length of piercing, as dead tissue builds up in the healing fistula.

== Rejection rate ==
Rejection rate is a term used by the piercing industry. It applies to the chance of a piercing being forced out by the body. This is a body's natural reaction to a foreign object being inserted into the skin. This behavior can be witnessed with other objects such as splinters, road rash, or infections. With surface piercings being closer to the surface of the skin, the tendency to reject is higher, as it is easier for the body to force the jewelry out.

=== Surface piercing rejection rates ===
Surface piercings, such as a navel piercing, Christina piercing, eyebrow piercing, or a nape piercing, tend to have a higher rejection rate than piercings that pass through a deeper area of flesh or have holes on the opposite side of each other. Thus surface piercings stand in contrast to piercings such as tongue piercings, earrings, or nose piercings.
