= Captive bead ring =

Circular piercing style

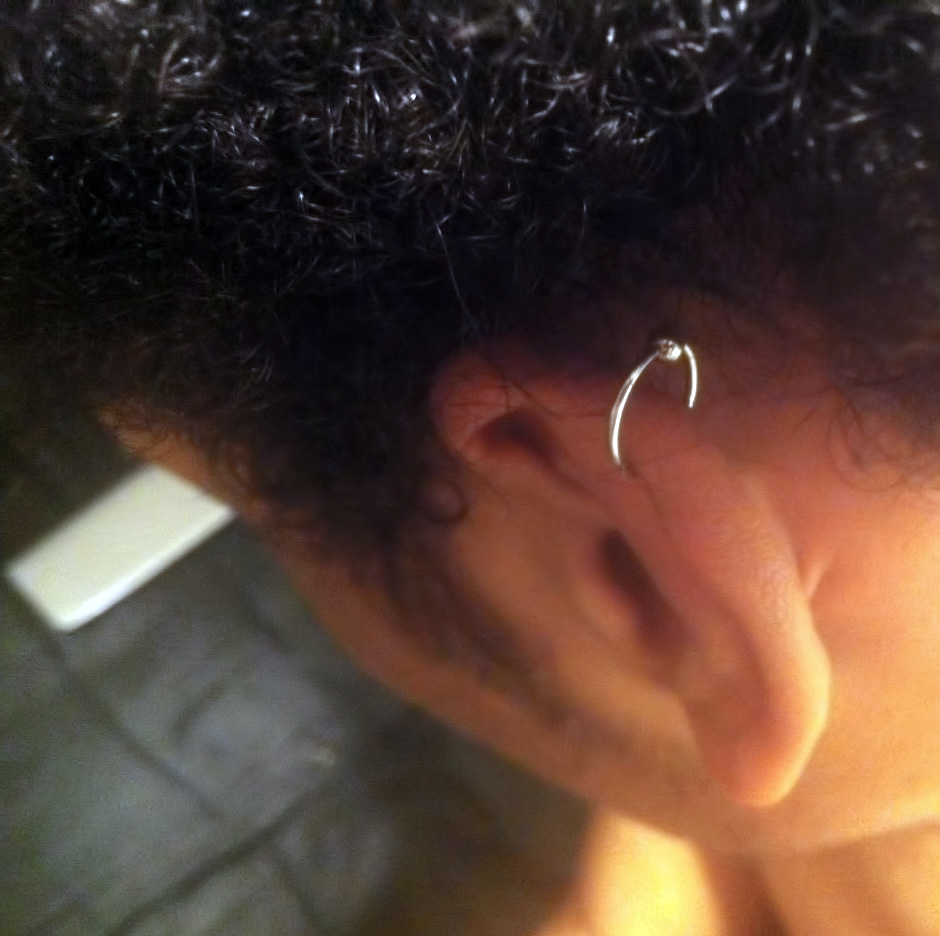
A CBR located on the helix portion of the ear.

A captive bead ring (CBR), ball closure ring (BCR), captive hoop, or captive ball ring is a common example of body piercing jewelry.

The captive bead or ball fits into a small opening in the circle of the ring. The bead is slightly larger than this opening and has small indentations or depressions that correspond to the ring's end-points so that it may fit snugly against them, thus completing the circuit of the ring. Often, a hole is drilled through the bead to allow easier fitting.

It uses the natural tensile or compressive strength of the metal the ring is made of, usually surgical stainless steel, niobium, or titanium, to hold the bead tightly in place. The bead or ball itself may additionally be made from coloured glass, acrylic or ceramic, or a gemstone.

This is a popular piece of body jewelry because it conveniently allows the wearer to remove the ring by simply removing the captive bead; the bead is held firmly in place so that it will not easily fall out. Additionally, because of their closed shape and rounded edges, these rings do not easily snag on clothing, hair, or furniture, making them a popular choice for piercings which are still healing. However, its circular shape means that it can drag dried lymph back into the healing piercing, meaning that barbells are seen as being preferable for certain healing piercings.
