= Vulva =

External genitalia of the female mammal

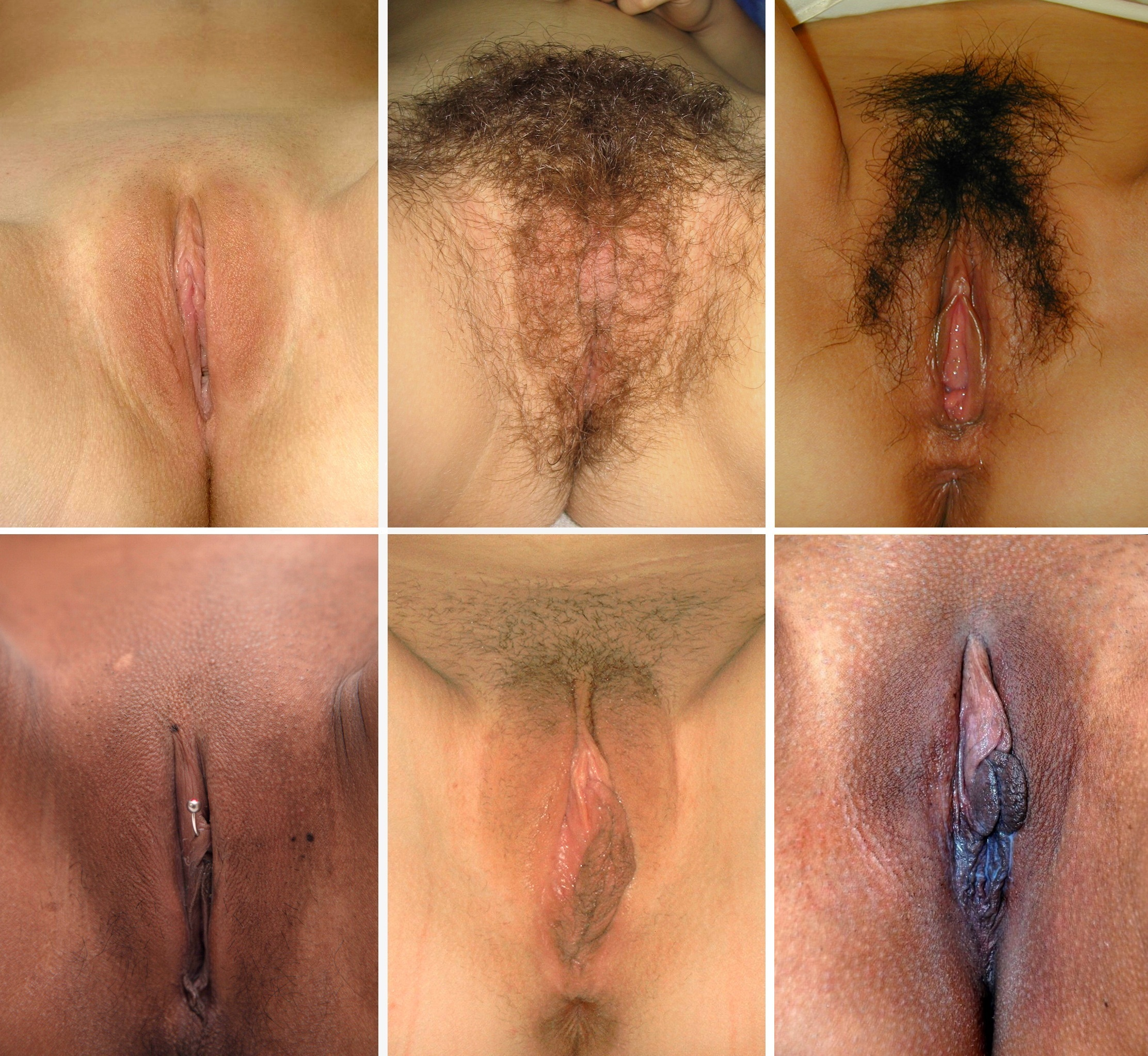
- Natural variation in vulvar appearance on humans

Details
- Precursor: Genital tubercle, urogenital folds, labioscrotal swellings, urogenital sinus
- System: Reproductive system, genitourinary system
- Artery: Internal pudendal artery, superficial external pudendal artery, deep external pudendal artery, labial arteries, clitoral arteries
- Vein: Internal pudendal veins, external pudendal veins, labial veins, clitoral veins
- Nerve: Pudendal nerve, perineal nerve, labial nerves, dorsal clitoral nerve, perineal branches of posterior femoral cutaneous nerve, genital branch of genitofemoral nerve
- Lymph: Superficial inguinal lymph nodes

Identifiers
- Latin: vulva, pudendum muliebre, pudendum femininum
- MeSH: D014844
- TA98: A09.2.01.001
- TA2: 3547
- FMA: 20462

In mammals, the vulva (pl. vulvas or vulvae) comprises mostly external, visible structures of the female genitalia leading into the interior of the female reproductive tract. For humans, it includes the mons pubis, labia majora, labia minora, clitoris, vestibule, urinary meatus, vaginal introitus, hymen, and openings of the vestibular glands (Bartholin's and Skene's). The folds of the outer and inner labia provide a double layer of protection for the vagina (which leads to the uterus). While the vagina is a separate part of the anatomy, colloquially the term has often been used synonymously with vulva. Pelvic floor muscles support the structures of the vulva. Other muscles of the urogenital triangle also give support.

Blood supply to the vulva comes from the three pudendal arteries. The internal pudendal veins give drainage. Afferent lymph vessels carry lymph away from the vulva to the inguinal lymph nodes. The nerves that supply the vulva are the pudendal nerve, perineal nerve, ilioinguinal nerve and their branches. Blood and nerve supply to the vulva contribute to the stages of sexual arousal that are helpful in the reproduction process.

Following the development of the vulva, changes take place at birth, childhood, puberty, menopause and post-menopause. There is a great deal of variation in the appearance of the vulva, particularly in relation to the labia minora. The vulva can be affected by many disorders, which may often result in irritation. Vulvovaginal health measures can prevent many of these. Other disorders include a number of infections and cancers. There are several vulval restorative surgeries known as genitoplasties, and some of these are also used as cosmetic surgery procedures.

Different cultures have held different views of the vulva. Some ancient religions and societies have worshipped the vulva and revered the female as a goddess. Major traditions in Hinduism continue this. In Western societies, there has been a largely negative attitude, typified by the Latinate medical terminology pudenda membra, meaning 'parts to be ashamed of'. There has been an artistic reaction to this in various attempts to bring about a more positive and natural outlook.

== Structure ==
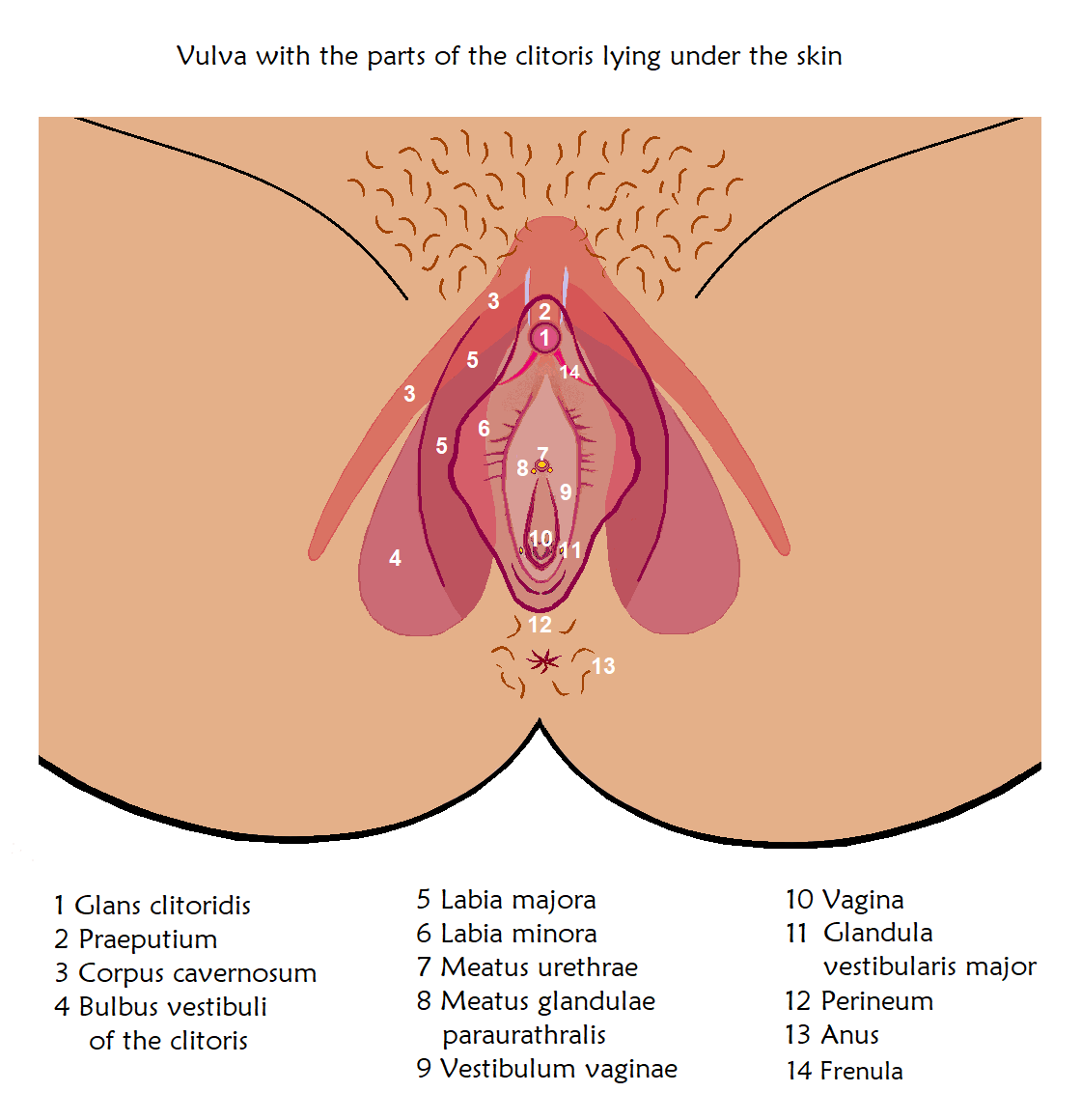
Labeled image of a vulva, showing external and internal views

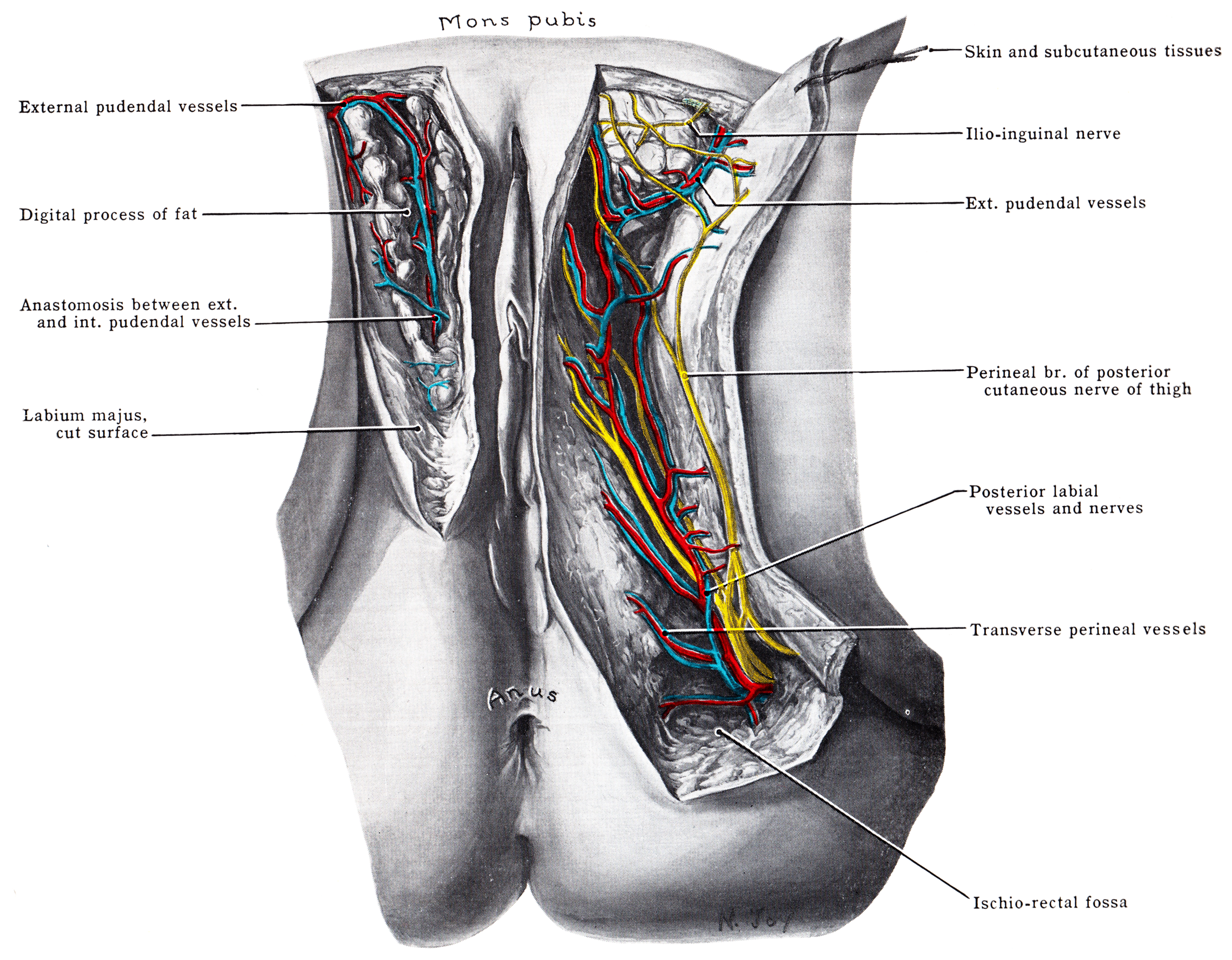
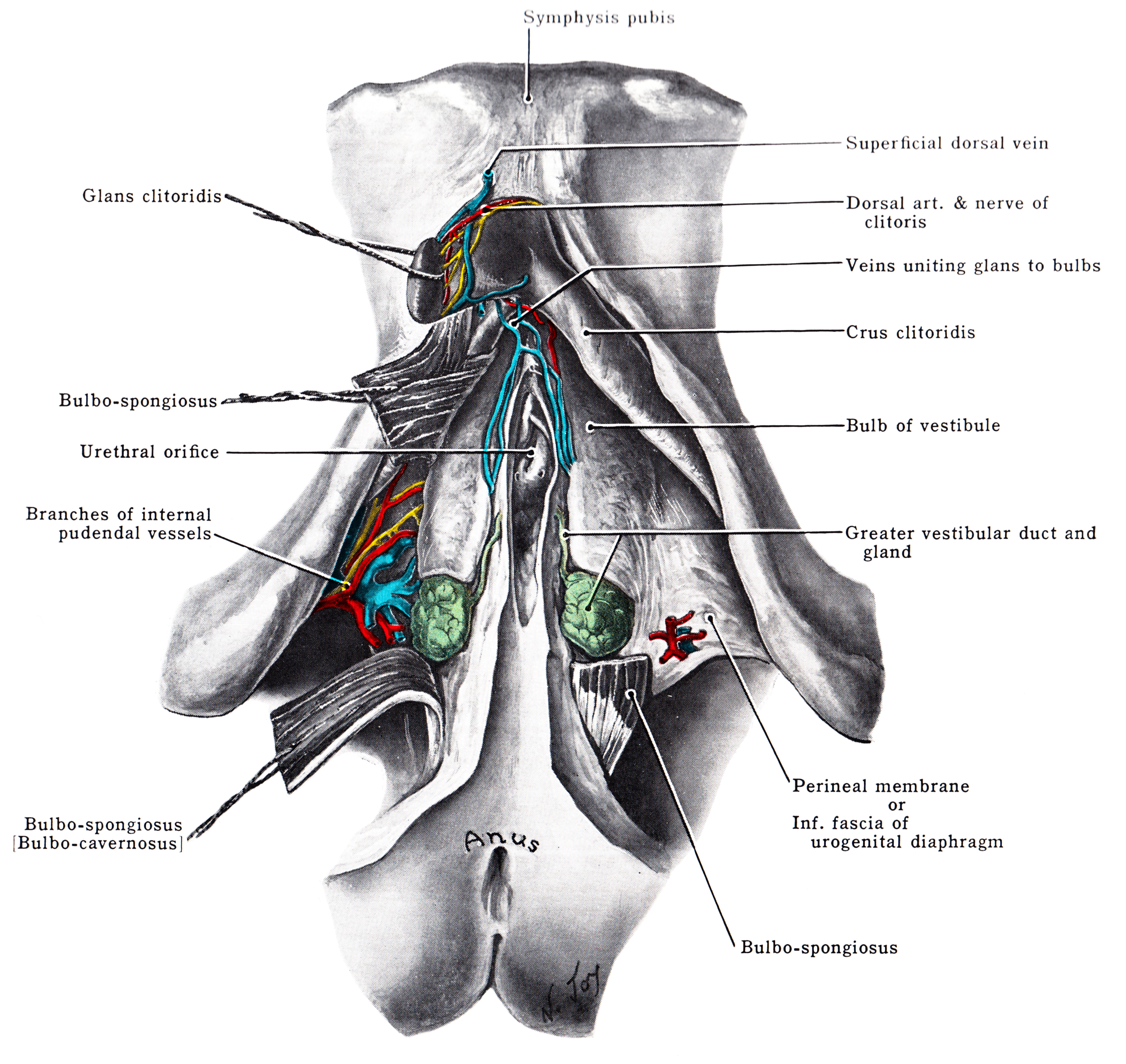
Labeled illustrations of the gross anatomy of the vulva

The human vulva is made up of the following:

=== Mons pubis ===
The mons pubis is a soft mound of fatty tissue in the pubic region covering the pubic bone. Mons pubis is Latin for "pubic mound" and is present in both sexes to act as a cushion during sexual intercourse, and is more pronounced in the female. The variant term mons veneris ('mound of Venus') is used specifically for females.

=== Labia ===
The large outer pair of folds are the labia majora, which contain and protect the labia minora and other structures of the vulva. The labia majora meet at the front of the mons pubis, and meet posteriorly at the urogenital triangle (the anterior part of the perineum) below the anus. The labia minora are the small inner pair of skin folds that protect the openings. The labia minora are often pink or brownish black, relevant to the person's skin color.

The grooves between the labia majora and minora are called the interlabial sulci, or interlabial folds. The labia minora meet posteriorly as the frenulum (fourchette).

=== Clitoris ===
Located at the anterior junction of the labia minora is the clitoris, a highly erogenous sexual organ. The visible portions of the clitoris are the glans and frenulum. Typically, the glans is roughly the size and shape of a pea, and can vary in size from about 6 mm to 25 mm (less than an inch). The size can also vary when the clitoris is erect, which happens when two regions of erectile tissue known as the corpora cavernosa (along with the bulbs and crura, which both constitute the root of the clitoris) fill with blood, making the shaft engorged. The glans contains many nerve endings, which makes it highly sensitive. The only known function of the clitoris is to focus on sexual feelings. The clitoral hood is a protective fold of skin and it may partially or completely cover the shaft and glans. The hood may be partially or completely hidden within the pudendal cleft.

=== Vestibule ===
The vestibule is the area between the labia minora, where the vaginal introitus and the urinary meatus - the openings of the vagina and urethra respectively - are located. The meatus is below the clitoris and atop the introitus. The introitus is usually partly covered by a membrane called the hymen, which tears, stretches, and changes in thickness with age. The hymen may rupture during the first episode of penetrative sex, and bleeding assumed to be produced by such a rupture has been incorrectly seen as proof of virginity. The hymen may rupture spontaneously during exercise or be stretched by normal activities such as the use of tampons and menstrual cups. Physiological variations mean that the hymen may be so minor as to be unnoticeable, or be absent. In some rare cases, the hymen may completely cover the introitus, requiring a surgical procedure called a hymenotomy. Two greater vestibular glands known as Bartholin's glands open into either side of the introitus and secrete a mucous vaginal lubricant. The openings of the lesser vestibular glands, known as Skene's glands, are found on either side of the urethral meatus.

=== Muscles ===
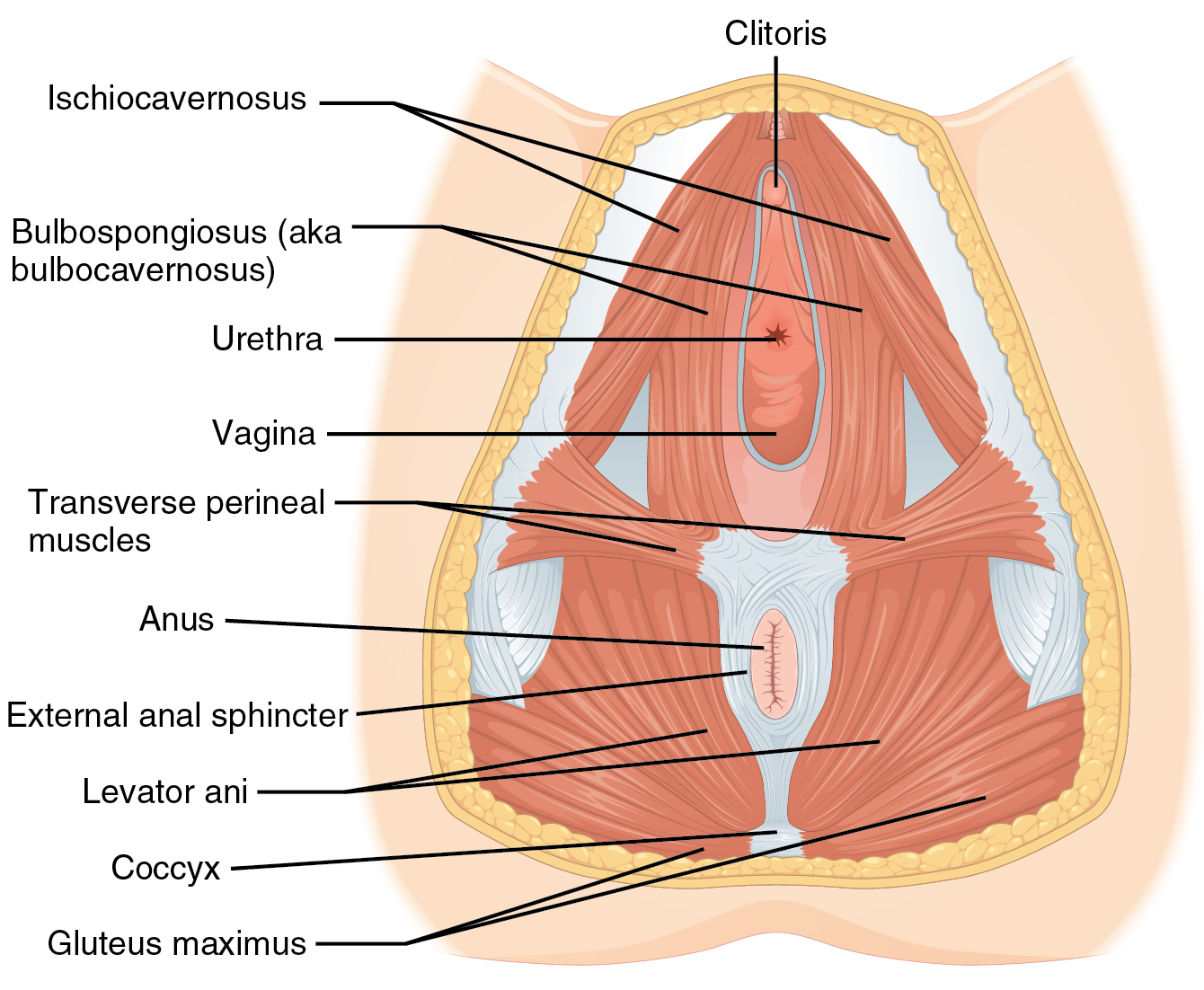
Muscles underlying the vulva and perineum

Pelvic floor muscles help to support the vulvar structures. The voluntary, pubococcygeus muscle, part of the levator ani muscle partially constricts the vaginal opening. Other muscles of the urogenital triangle support the vulvar area and they include the transverse perineal muscles, the bulbospongiosus, and the ischiocavernosus muscles. The bulbospongiosus muscle decreases the vaginal opening. They play a role in the vaginal contractions of orgasm by causing the vestibular bulbs to contract.

=== Blood, lymph and nerve supply ===
The tissues of the vulva are highly vascularised and blood supply is provided by the three pudendal arteries. Venous return is via the external and internal pudendal veins. The organs and tissues of the vulva are drained by a chain of superficial inguinal lymph nodes located along the blood vessels.

The ilioinguinal nerve originates from the first lumbar nerve and gives branches that include the anterior labial nerves, which supply the skin of the mons pubis and the labia majora. The perineal nerve is one of the terminal branches of the pudendal nerve and this branches into the posterior labial nerves to supply the labia. The pudendal nerve branches include the dorsal nerve, which gives sensation to the clitoris. The clitoral glans is seen to be populated by a large number of small nerves, a number that decreases as the tissue changes towards the urethra. The density of nerves at the glans indicates that it is the center of heightened sensation. Cavernous nerves from the uterovaginal plexus supply the erectile tissue of the clitoris. These are joined underneath the pubic arch by the dorsal nerve of the clitoris. The pudendal nerve enters the pelvis through the lesser sciatic foramen and continues medial to the internal pudendal artery. The point where the nerve circles the ischial spine is the location where a pudendal block of local anesthetic can be administered to inhibit sensation to the vulva. A number of smaller nerves split off from the pudendal nerve. The deep branch of the perineal nerve supplies the muscles of the perineum and a branch of this supplies the bulb of the vestibule.

=== Variations ===
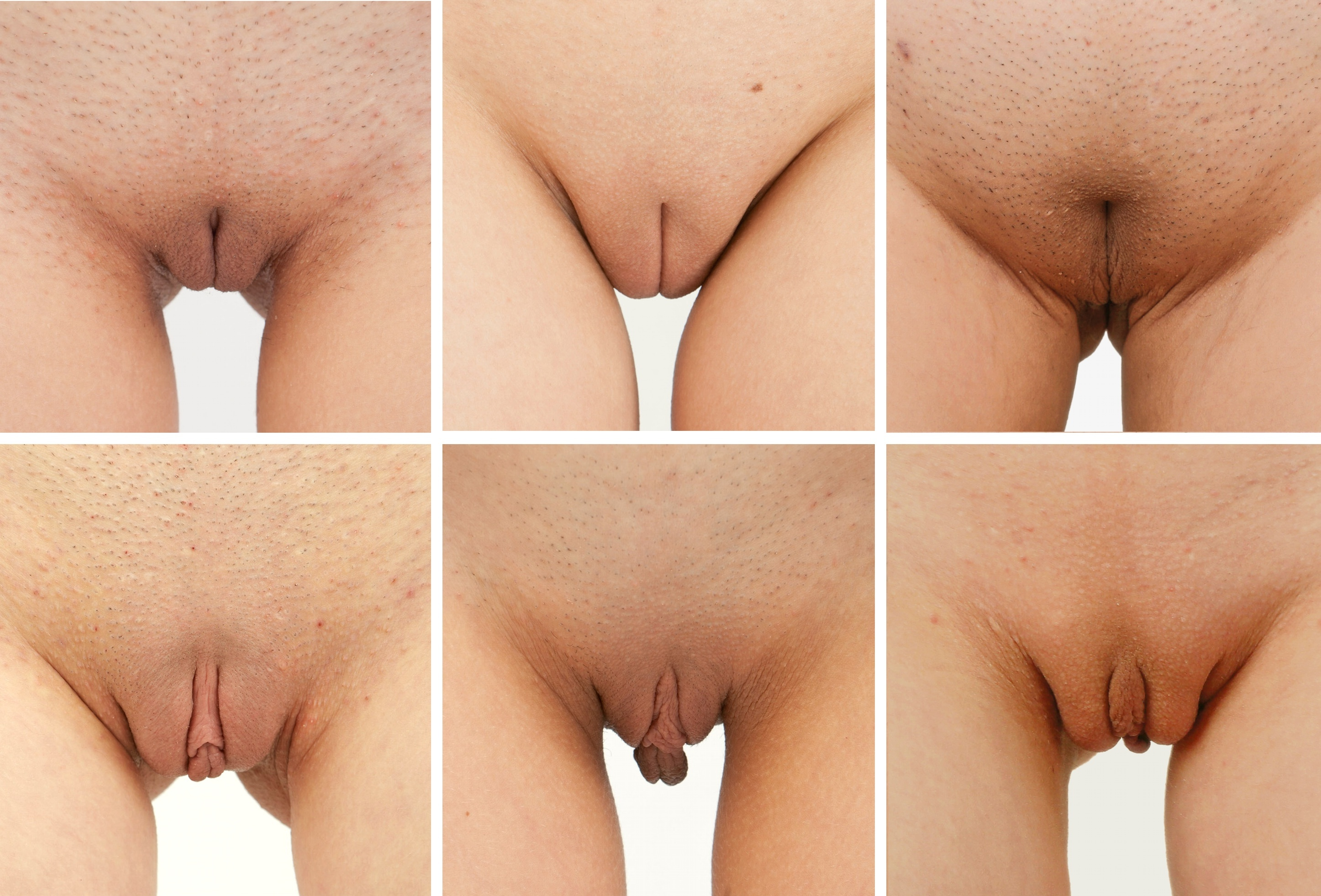
The length of the labia minora varies significantly between women: while the labia majora completely enclose the labia minora in some women (top row), in other women, they protrude and are clearly visible in an upright standing position (bottom row). Colloquially, these variations of the labia are also referred to as "innies" and "outies".

There is a great deal of variation in the appearance of the vulva. Much of this variation lies in the significant differences in the size, shape, and color of the labia minora. Though called the smaller lips, they can often be of considerable size and may protrude outside the labia majora. This variation has also been evidenced in a large display of 400 vulval casts called the Great Wall of Vagina created by Jamie McCartney to fill the lack of information of what a normal vulva looks like. The casts taken from a large and varied group of women showed clearly that there is much variation. Other variations of the vulva include the appearance of Fordyce spots and clitoral phimosis (when the clitoral hood cannot retract past the glans).

Researchers from the Elizabeth Garret Anderson Hospital, London, measured multiple genital dimensions of 50 women between the ages of 18 and 50, with a mean age of 35.6:

Measurement	Range	Mean [standard deviation]
Clitoral length (mm)	5.0–35.0	19.1 [8.7]
Clitoral glans width (mm)	3.0–10.0	5.5 [1.7]
Clitoris to urethra (mm)	16.0–45.0	28.5 [7.1]
Labia majora length (cm)	7.0–12.0	9.3 [1.3]
Labia minora length (mm)	20–100	60.6 [17.2]
Labia minora width (mm)	7.0–50.0	21.8 [9.4]
Perineum length (mm)	15.0–55.0	31.3 [8.5]
Vaginal length (cm)	6.5–12.5	9.6 [1.5]

Observation	Category	Frequency
Pubic hair distribution (Tanner stage)	IV	4 (8%)
Pubic hair distribution (Tanner stage)	V	46 (92%)
Color of the genital area compared to the surrounding skin	Same color	9 (18%)
Color of the genital area compared to the surrounding skin	Darker color	41 (82%)
Rugosity of the labia	Smooth (unwrinkled)	14 (28%)
Rugosity of the labia	Moderately wrinkled	34 (68%)
Rugosity of the labia	Markedly wrinkled	2 (4%)

== Development ==
=== Prenatal development ===
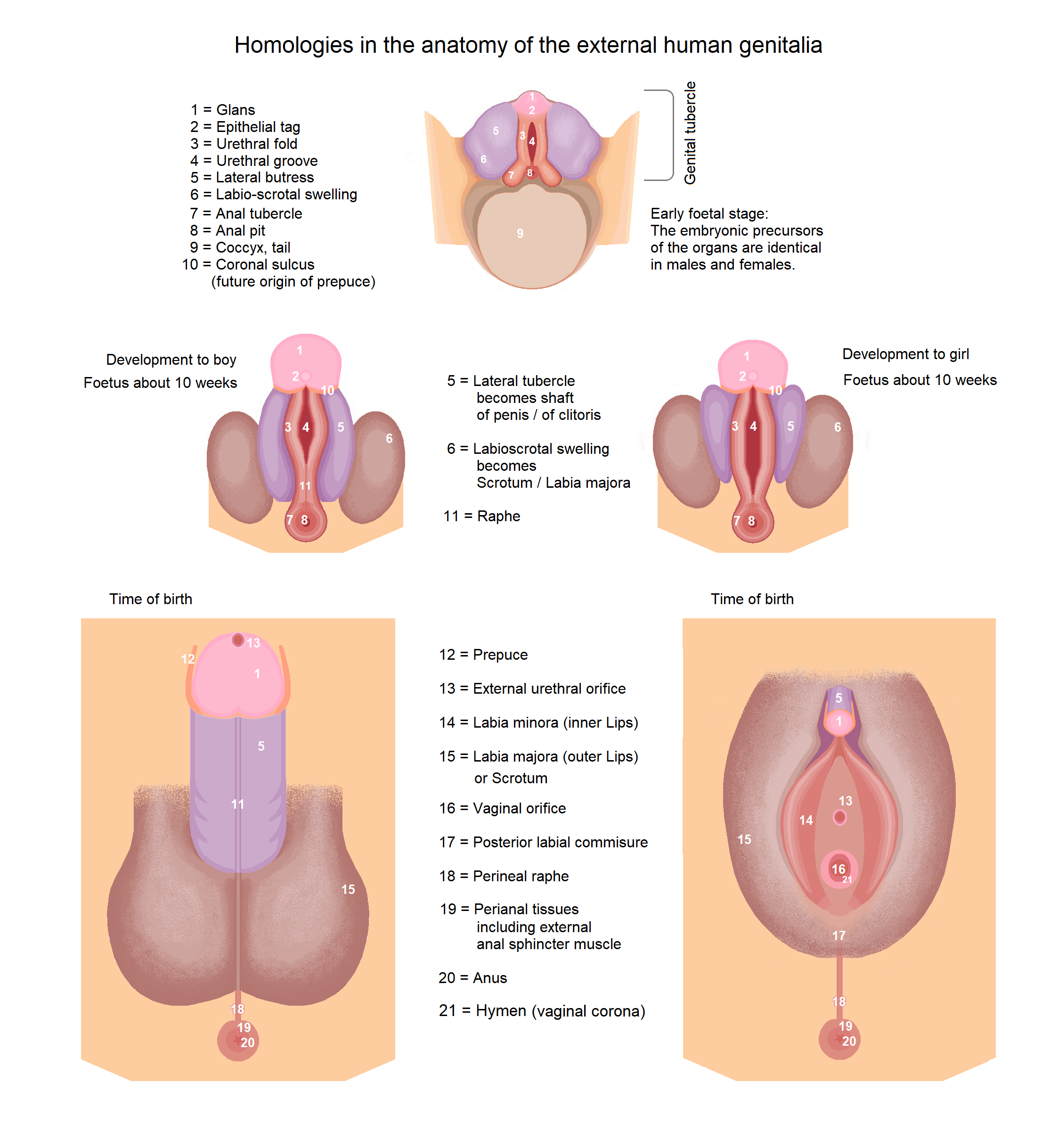
Development of external genitals showing homologues from indifferent to both sexes—female on right

In week three of the development of the embryo, mesenchyme cells from the primitive streak migrate around the cloacal membrane. Early in the fifth week, the cells form two swellings called the cloacal folds. The cloacal folds meet in front of the cloacal membrane and form a raised area known as the genital tubercle. The urorectal septum fuses with the cloacal membrane to form the perineum. This division creates two areas one surrounded by the urethral folds and the other by the anal folds. These areas become the urogenital triangle and the anal triangle. The area between the vulva and the anus is known as the clinical perineum.

At the same time, a pair of swellings on either side of the urethral folds known as the genital swellings develop into the labioscrotal swellings. Sexual differentiation takes place, and at the end of week six in the female, hormones stimulate further development and the genital tubercle bends and forms the clitoris. The urogenital sinus persists as the vulval vestibule, vestibular glands and urethra. The urethral folds form the labia minora and the labioscrotal swellings form the labia majora.

The uterovaginal canal or genital canal, forms in the third month of the development of the urogenital system. The lower part of the canal is blocked off by a plate of tissue, the vaginal plate. This tissue develops and lengthens during the third to fifth months and the lower part of the vaginal canal is formed by a process of desquamation or cell shedding. The end of the vaginal canal is blocked off by an endodermal membrane, which separates the opening from the vestibule. In the fifth month, the membrane degenerates but leaves a remnant called the hymen.

=== Childhood ===
The newborn's vulva may be swollen or enlarged as a result of having been exposed, via the placenta, to her mother's increased levels of hormones. The labia majora are closed. These changes disappear over the first few months. During childhood before puberty, the lack of estrogen can cause the labia to become sticky and to ultimately join firmly together. This condition is known as labial fusion and is rarely found after puberty when estrogen production has increased.

=== Puberty ===
Puberty is the onset of the ability to reproduce, and takes place over two to three years, producing a number of changes. The structures of the vulva become proportionately larger and may become more pronounced. Pubarche, the first appearance of pubic hair develops, firstly on the labia majora, and later spreads to the mons pubis, and sometimes to the inner thighs and perineum. Pubic hair is much coarser than other body hair, and is considered a secondary sex characteristic. Pubarche can occur independently of puberty. Premature pubarche may sometimes indicate a later metabolic-endocrine disorder seen at adolescence. The disorder sometimes known as a polyendocrine disorder is marked by elevated levels of androgen, insulin, and lipids, and may originate in the fetus. Instead of being seen as a normal variant it is proposed that premature pubarche may be seen as a marker for these later endocrine disorders.

Apocrine sweat glands secrete sweat into the pubic hair follicles. This is broken down by bacteria on the skin and produces an odor, which some consider to act as an attractant sex pheromone. The labia minora may grow more prominent and undergo changes in color. At puberty, the first monthly period known as menarche marks the onset of menstruation. In prepubertal girls, the skin of the vulva is thin and delicate, and its neutral pH makes it prone to irritation. The production of the female sex hormone estradiol (an estrogen) at puberty, causes the perineal skin to thicken by keratinising, and this reduces the risk of infection. Estrogen also causes the laying down of fat in the development of the secondary sex characteristics. This contributes to the maturation of the vulva with increases in the size of the mons pubis, and the labia majora and the enlargement of the labia minora.

=== Pregnancy ===
In pregnancy, the vulva and vagina take on a bluish coloring due to venous congestion. This appears between the eighth and twelfth week and continues to darken as the pregnancy continues. Estrogen is produced in large quantities during pregnancy and this causes the vulva to become enlarged. The vaginal opening and the vagina are also enlarged. After childbirth, a vaginal discharge known as lochia is produced and continues for about ten days.

=== Menopause ===
During menopause, hormone levels decrease, which causes changes in the vulva known as vulvovaginal atrophy. The decreased estrogen affects the mons, the labia, and the vaginal opening and can cause pale, itchy, and sore skin. Other visible changes are a thinning of the pubic hair, a loss of fat from the labia majora, a thinning of the labia minora, and a narrowing of the vaginal opening. This condition has been renamed by some bodies as the genitourinary syndrome of menopause as a more comprehensive term.

== Function and physiology ==
The vulva has a major role to play in the reproductive system. It provides entry to, and protection for the uterus, and the right conditions in terms of warmth and moisture that aids in its sexual and reproductive functions. The vulva is richly innervated and provides pleasure when properly stimulated. The mons pubis provides cushioning against the pubic bone during intercourse.

A number of different secretions are associated with the vulva, including urine (from the urethral opening during urination through control of the external sphincter muscle), sweat (from the apocrine glands), menses (leaving from the vagina via the introitus), sebum (from the sebaceous glands), alkaline fluid (from the Bartholin's glands), mucus (from the Skene's glands), vaginal lubrication from the vaginal wall and smegma. Smegma is a white substance formed from a combination of dead cells, skin oils, moisture and naturally occurring bacteria, that forms in the genitalia. In females, this thickened secretion collects around the clitoris and labial folds. It can cause discomfort during sexual activity as it can cause the clitoral glans to stick to the hood, and is easily removed by bathing. Aliphatic acids known as copulins are also secreted in the vagina. These are believed to act as pheromones. Their fatty acid composition, and consequently their odor changes in relation to the stages of the menstrual cycle.

=== Sexual stimulation and arousal ===
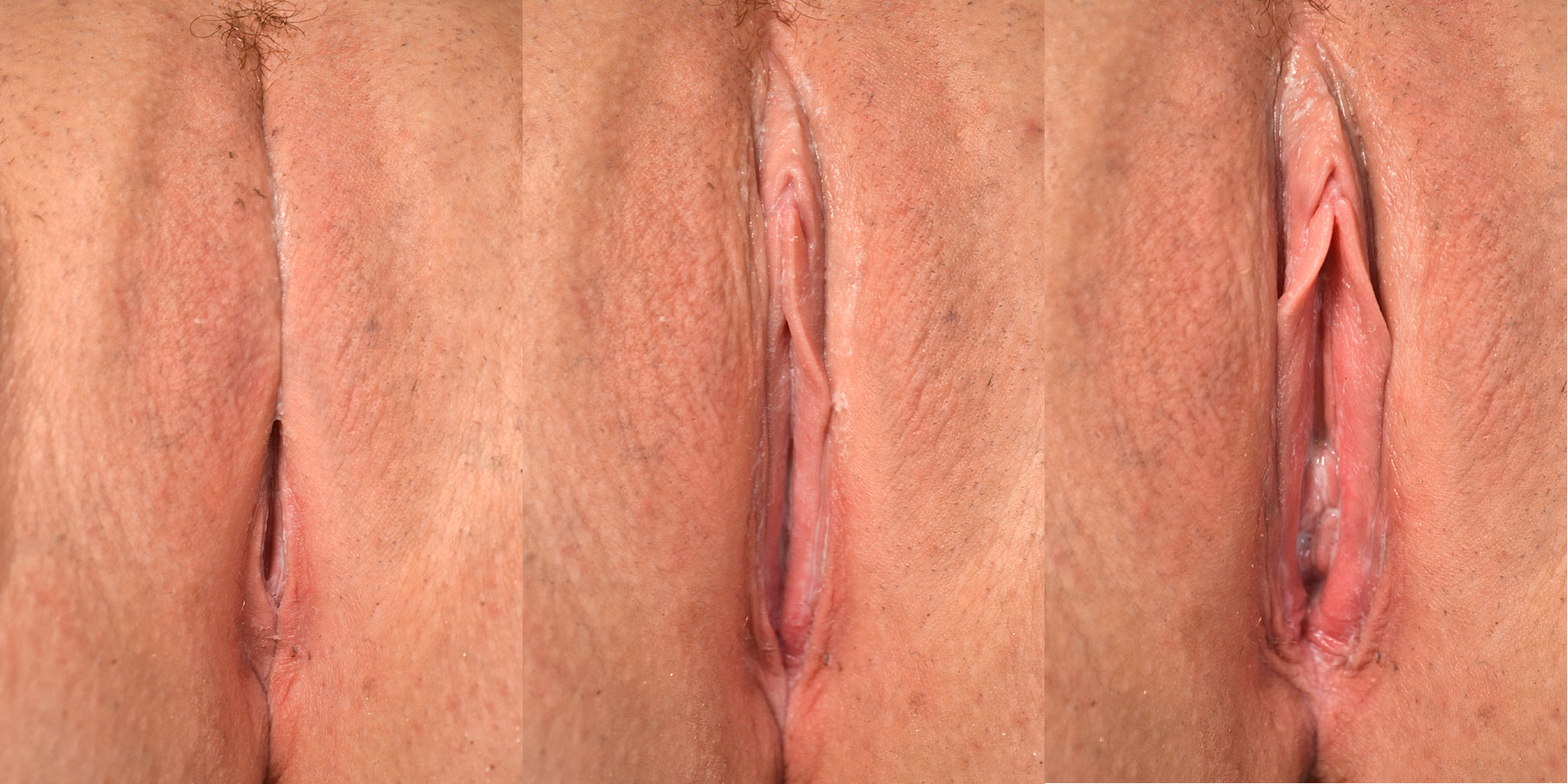
A vulva with receding labia majora, developing clitoral erection, engorgement of the labia minora, and increased vaginal lubrication

The clitoris and the labia minora are both the most erogenous areas of the vulva. The labia majora are also somewhat erogenous. Local stimulation can involve the clitoris, vagina and other perineal regions. The clitoris (especially the glans) is the human female's most sensitive erogenous zone and generally the primary anatomical source of human female sexual pleasure. Sexual stimulation of the clitoris (by a number of means) can result in widespread sexual arousal and, if maintained, can result in orgasm. Stimulation to vulvar orgasm is optimally achieved by a massaging sensation, such as oral sex (cunnilingus), fingering, and tribadism (two women rubbing vulvas together).

Sexual arousal results in a number of physical changes in the vulva. During arousal, the Bartholin's glands produce more vaginal lubrication. Vulval tissue is highly vascularised; arterioles dilate in response to sexual arousal and the smaller veins will compress after arousal, so that the clitoris and labia minora increase in size. Increased vasocongestion in the vagina causes it to swell, decreasing the size of the vaginal opening by about 30%. Clitoral erection takes place, which retracts the clitoral hood, causing the glans to appear. The labia majora have swollen from blood flow, and slightly separated, revealing a thick and engorged labia minora. The labia minora sometimes change considerably in color, going from pink to red in lighter skinned women who have not borne a child, or red to dark red in those who have.

During orgasm, rhythmic muscle contractions occur in the outer third of the vagina, as well as the uterus and anus. Contractions become less intense and more randomly spaced as the orgasm continues. The number of contractions that accompany an orgasm vary depending on its intensity. An orgasm may be accompanied by female ejaculation, causing liquid from the Skene's glands to be expelled through the urethra. The pooled blood begins to dissipate, although at a much slower rate if an orgasm has not occurred. The vagina and its opening return to their normal relaxed state, and the rest of the vulva returns to its normal size, position and color.

== Clinical significance ==
=== Irritation ===
Irritation and itching of the vulva is called pruritus vulvae. This can be a symptom of many disorders, some of which may be determined by a patch test. The most common cause of irritation is thrush, a fungal infection. Vulvovaginal health measures can help to prevent many disorders including thrush. Infections of the vagina such as vaginosis and of the uterus may produce vaginal discharge, which can be an irritant when it comes into contact with the vulvar tissue. Inflammation as vaginitis, vulvovaginitis and vulvitis can result from this causing irritation and pain. Ingrown hairs resulting from pubic hair shaving can cause folliculitis where the hair follicle becomes infected; or give rise to an inflammatory response known as pseudofolliculitis pubis. A less common cause of irritation is genital lichen planus, another inflammatory disorder. A severe variant of this is vulvovaginal gingival syndrome, which can lead to narrowing of the vagina, or vulva destruction. Many types of infection and other diseases including some cancers may cause irritation.

=== Sexually transmitted infections ===
Water warts of molluscum contagiosum

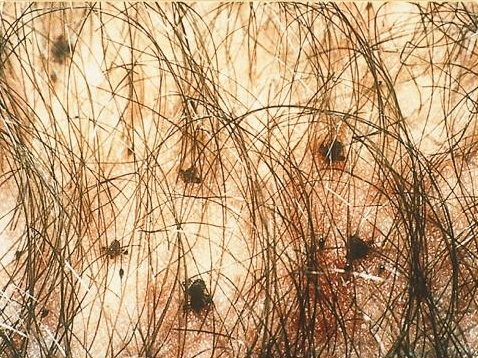
Pubic hair with crab lice

Vulvar organs and tissues can become affected by different infectious agents such as bacteria and viruses, or infested by parasites such as lice and mites. Over thirty types of pathogen can be sexually transmitted, and many of these affect the genitals. Most STIs do not produce symptoms or symptoms may be mild and not be indicative of an STI. The practice of safe sex can greatly reduce the risk of infection from many sexually transmitted pathogens. The use of condoms (either male or female condoms) is one of the most effective methods of protection.

Bacterial infections include: chancroid – characterised by genital ulcers known as chancres; granuloma inguinale showing as inflammatory granulomas often described as nodules; syphilis –the primary stage classically presents with a single chancre, a firm, painless, non-itchy ulcer, but there may be multiple sores; and gonorrhea that very often presents no symptoms but can result in discharge.

Viral infections include human papillomavirus infection (HPV) – this is the most common STI and has many types. Genital HPV can cause genital warts. There have been links made between HPV and vulvar cancer, though HPV most often causes cervical cancer. Genital herpes is mostly asymptomatic but can present with small blisters that break open into ulcers. HIV/AIDS is mostly transmitted through sexual activity, and the vulva in some cases can be affected by sores. A highly contagious viral infection is molluscum contagiosum, which is transmissible on close contact and causes water warts.

Parasitic infections include trichomoniasis, pediculosis pubis, and scabies. Trichomoniasis is transmitted by a parasitic protozoan and is the most common non-viral STI. Most cases are asymptomatic but may present symptoms of irritation and a discharge of unusual odor. Pediculosis pubis, commonly called crabs, is a disease caused by the crab louse an ectoparasite. When the pubic hair is infested, the irritation produced can be intense. Scabies, also known as the "seven year itch", is caused by another ectoparasite, the mite Sarcoptes scabiei, giving intense irritation.

=== Cancer ===
Malignancies can develop in the glabrous and hair-bearing parts of the vulva. Based on the cellular origin and histology, vulvar cancers are classified into squamous cell carcinomas, melanomas, basal cell carcinomas, adenocarcinomas, sarcomas and invasive extramammary Paget's disease. Squamous cell carcinomas represent the most common variant of vulvar cancers and account for approximately 75%. These are usually found in the labia, particularly the labia majora. The second most common vulvar cancer is basal cell carcinoma, which rarely spreads to regional lymph nodes or distant organs. The third most common subtype is vulvar melanoma. Studies have shown that vulvar melanomas appear to have a different tumor biology and mutational characteristics compared to skin melanomas, which has a direct impact on the medical treatment of vulvar melanomas.

Signs and symptoms of vulvar cancer can include: itching, or bleeding; skin changes including rashes, sores, lumps or ulcers, and changes in vulvar skin coloration. Pelvic pain might also occur especially during urinating and sex. However, a significant proportion remains asymptomatic in early disease stages, often delaying its diagnosis. As such, 32% of women with vulvar melanoma already have regional involvement or distant metastases at the time of diagnosis, which significantly impacts prognosis.

Surgery (with or without removal of regional lymph nodes) is usually the primary treatment modality. Typically, a wide-local excision is performed, in which the tumor is excised including a safety-margin of healthy tissue to ensure its entire removal, which is confirmed by a pathologist. In more advanced disease, a (partial) vulvectomy may need to be performed in order to remove some or all of the vulva. Advanced-stage melanomas can be treated with checkpoint inhibitors.

=== Other ===
Labial fusion, also called labial adhesion, is the fusion of the labia minora. This affects a number of young girls and is not considered unduly problematic. The condition can usually be treated using creams, or it may right itself with the release of hormones at the onset of puberty.

Clitoromegaly is an enlarged clitoris caused by either anabolic steroids or an intersex condition.

Vulvodynia is chronic pain in the vulvar region. There is no single identifiable cause. A subtype of this is vulvar vestibulitis but since this is not thought to be an inflammatory condition it is more usually referred to as vestibulodynia. Vulvar vestibulitis usually affects pre-menopausal women.

Pudendal nerve entrapment can cause sharp pain or numbness in the vulva. This condition can be caused by activities such as cycling, giving birth, or prolonged sitting.

A number of skin disorders such as lichen sclerosus, and lichen simplex chronicus can affect the vulva. Crohn's disease of the vulva is an uncommon form of metastatic Crohn's disease, which manifests as a skin condition showing as hypertrophic lesions or vulvar abscesses. Papillary hidradenomas are nodules that can ulcerate and are mostly found on the skin of the labia or of the interlabial folds. Another more complex ulcerative condition is hidradenitis suppurativa, which is characterised by painful cysts that can ulcerate, and recur, and can become chronic lasting for many years. Chronic cases can develop into squamous cell carcinomas. An asymptomatic skin disorder of the vulval vestibule is vestibular papillomatosis, which is characterised by fine, pink projections from either the epithelium of the vulva or from the labia minora. Dermatoscopy can distinguish this condition from genital warts. A subtype of psoriasis, an autoimmune disease, is inverse psoriasis in which red patches can appear in the skin folds of the labia.

=== Childbirth ===
The vulvar region is at risk for trauma during childbirth. During childbirth, the vagina and vulva must stretch to accommodate the baby's head (approximately 9.5 cm (3.7 in)). This can result in tears known as perineal tears in the vaginal opening, and other structures within the perineum. An episiotomy (a pre-emptive surgical cutting of the perineum) is sometimes performed to facilitate delivery and limit tearing. A tear takes longer to heal than an incision. Tears and incisions may be repaired using sutures that may be layered. Among the methods of hair removal evaluated for pre-surgeries, pubic hair shaving known as prepping, was seen to increase the risk of surgical site infections. No advantages have been demonstrated in the routine shaving of pubic hair prior to childbirth.

=== Surgery ===
Genitoplasties are plastic surgeries that can be carried out to repair, restore or alter vulvar tissues, particularly following damage caused by injury or cancer treatment. These procedures include vaginoplasty and vulvoplasty, which can also be performed as a cosmetic surgery. Other cosmetic surgeries to change the appearance of external structures include labiaplasties. Some of these procedures, vaginoplasties and vulvoplasties, are also carried out as gender-affirming surgeries.

The use of cosmetic surgeries has been criticized by clinicians. The American College of Obstetricians and Gynecologists recommends that women be informed of the risks of these surgeries. They refer to the lack of data relevant to their safety and effectiveness and to the potential associated risks such as infection, altered sensation, dyspareunia, adhesions, and scarring. There is also a percentage of people seeking cosmetic surgery who may be suffering from body dysmorphic disorder and surgery in these cases can be counterproductive.

== Society and culture ==
=== Altering the female genitalia ===
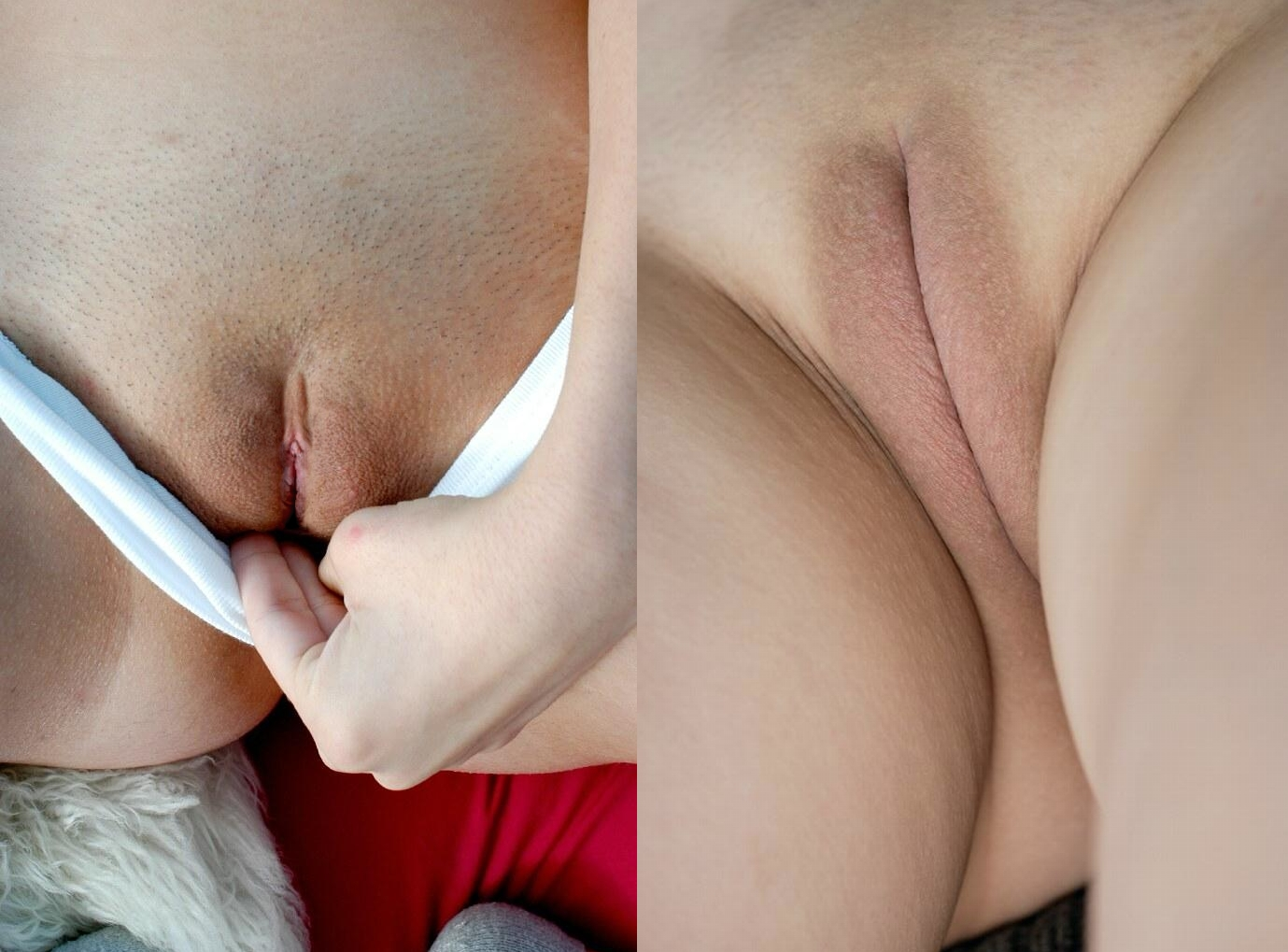
Appearance of an adult vulva after labiaplasty and clitoral hood reduction

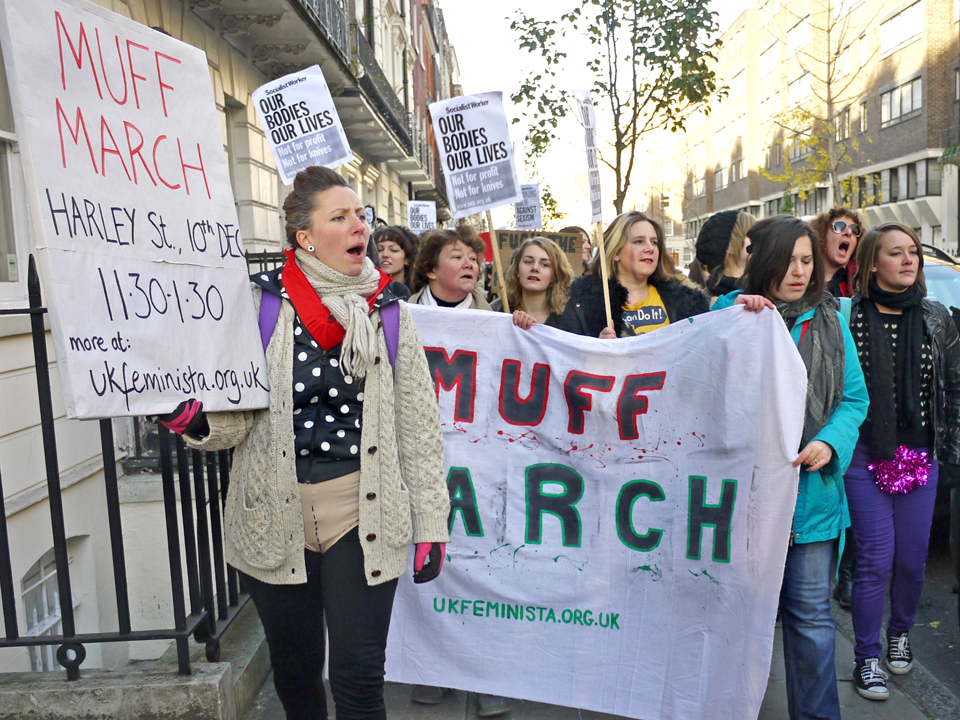
The labia pride movement opposes the ideals of female cosmetic genital surgeries: The Muff March in London, 2011

In some cultural practices, particularly in the African Khoikhoi and Rwanda cultures, the labia minora are purposefully stretched by repeated pulling on them and sometimes by attaching weights. Labia stretching is a recognised, familial cultural practice in parts of Eastern and Southern Africa. This is a desired and encouraged practice by the women (starting at puberty) in order to promote better sexual satisfaction for both parties. The achieved extensions can hang down below the labia majora for up to seven inches. Children in the African diaspora practise this too, so it occurs within immigrant communities in, for example, Britain, where a BBC News report labelled it a hidden form of child abuse. The girls are subject to familial and social pressure to conform.

In some cultures, including modern Western culture, women have shaved or otherwise removed the hair from part or all of the vulva. When high-cut swimsuits became fashionable, women who wished to wear them would remove the hair on either side of their pubic triangles, to avoid exhibiting pubic hair. Other women prefer to retain their vulva hair. The removal of hair from the vulva is a fairly recent phenomenon in the United States, Canada, and Western Europe, usually in the form of bikini waxing or Brazilian waxing, but has been prevalent in many Eastern European and Middle Eastern cultures for centuries, usually due to the idea that it may be more hygienic, or originating in prostitution and pornography. Hair removal may include all, most, or some of the hair. French waxing leaves a small amount of hair on either side of the labia or a strip directly above and in line with the pudendal cleft called a landing strip. Islam teaching includes Muslim hygienical jurisprudence a practice of which is the removal of pubic hair.

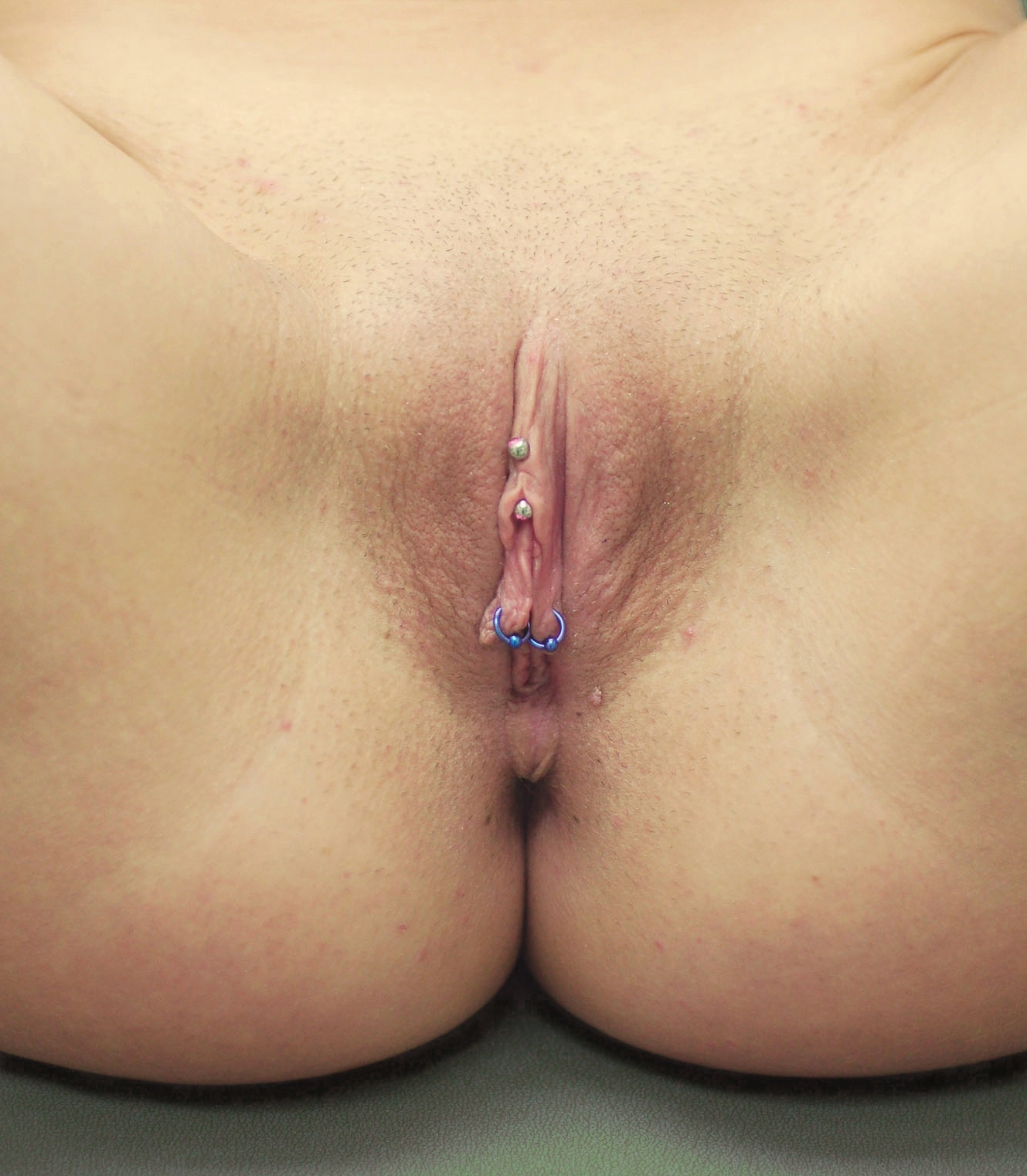
Vulva piercings include the clitoral hood piercing above and the labia piercing

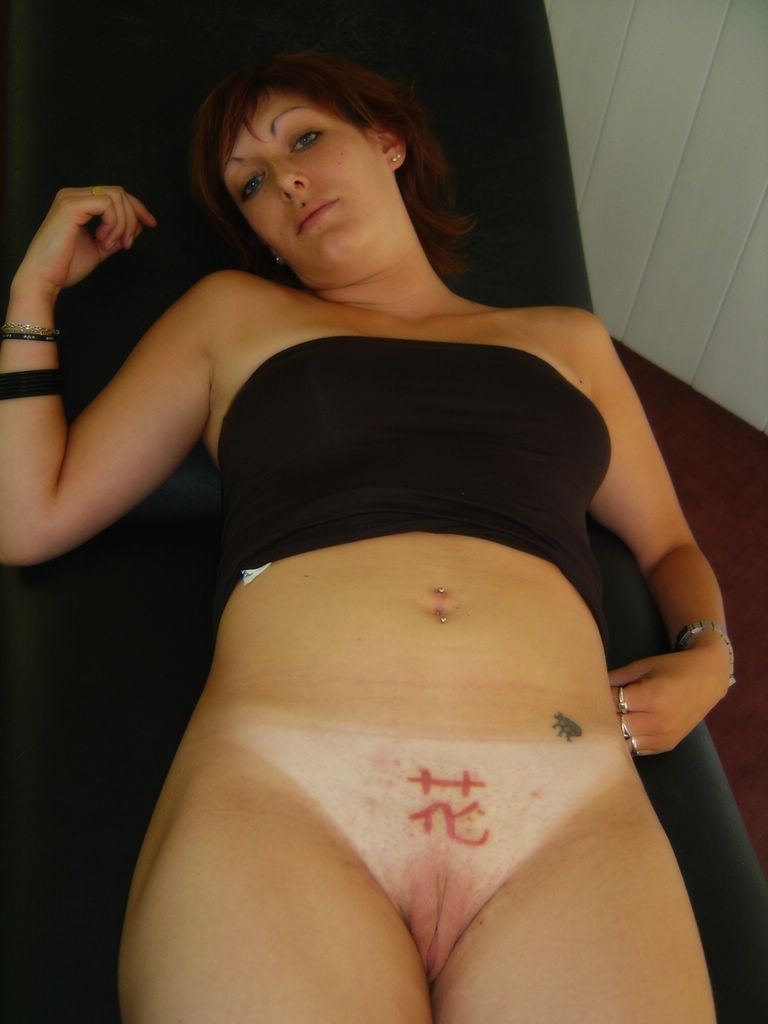
Derived from traditional symbols, Hanabira scarification is intended to decorate the pubic area

Several forms of genital piercings can be made in the vulva, and include the Christina, Princess Albertina, Isabella, Nefertiti, fourchette, and labia piercings. Piercings are usually performed for aesthetic purposes, but some forms like the clitoral hood piercing (or rarely glans piercing) might also enhance pleasure during sex. Though they are common in traditional cultures, intimate piercings are a fairly recent trend in Western society. Other forms of permanent modifications of the vulva for cultural, decorative or aesthetic reasons are genital tattoos or scarification (so-called "Hanabira").

Female genital surgery includes laser resurfacing of the labia to remove wrinkles, labiaplasty (reducing the size of the labia) and vaginoplasty. In September 2007, the American College of Obstetricians and Gynecologists (ACOG) issued a committee opinion on these and other female genital surgeries, including "vaginal rejuvenation", "designer vaginoplasty", "revirgination", and "G-spot amplification". This opinion states that the safety of these procedures has not been documented. The ACOG and the ISSVD recommend that women seeking these surgeries need to be informed about the lack of data supporting these procedures and the potential associated risks such as infection, altered sensation, dyspareunia, adhesions, and scarring.

With the growing popularity of female cosmetic genital surgeries, the practice increasingly draws criticism from an opposition movement of cyberfeminist activist groups and platforms, called the labia pride movement. The major point of contention is that heavy advertising for these procedures, in combination with a lack of public education, fosters body insecurities in women with larger labia in spite of the fact that there is normal and pronounced individual variation in the size of labia. The preference for smaller labia is a matter of a fashion fad and is without clinical or functional significance.

=== Female genital mutilation ===
female genital mutilation mostly involves the partial or complete removal of the vulva. Female genital mutilation is carried out in thirty countries in Africa and Asia with more than 200 million girls being affected, and some women (as of 2018). Nearly all of the procedures are carried out on young girls. The practices are also carried out globally among migrants from these areas. Female genital mutilation is claimed to be mostly carried out for cultural traditional reasons. According to the research conducted under In the Name of Tradition, FGM/C is more common in Sunni countries and less common in Shia societies.

FGM/C can have harmful effects on their physical and mental health. Various official and unofficial research reports also confirm these complications. In its various reports, the World Health Organization has considered FGM/C as an action that endangers women's health in various ways. This organization stated in a report published in January 2023 that FGM/C has no health benefits, and it harms girls and women in many ways. It involves removing and damaging healthy and normal female genital tissue, and it interferes with the natural functions of girls' and women's bodies. Although all forms of FGM/C are associated with increased risk of health complications, the risk is greater with more severe forms of FGM/C.

The American National Library of Medicine also stated in an article in 2018 that the consequences of FGM/C have both physiological and psychological complications, including short- and long-term complications. The method in which the procedure is performed may determine the extent of the short-term complications. If the process was completed using unsterile equipment, no antiseptics, and no antibiotics, the victim may have increased risk of complications. Primary infections include staphylococcus infections, urinary tract infections, excessive and uncontrollable pain, and hemorrhaging. Infections such as human immunodeficiency virus (HIV), Chlamydia trachomatis, Clostridium tetani, and herpes simplex virus (HSV) 2 are significantly more common among women who underwent Type 3 mutilation compared with other categories.

=== Etymology ===
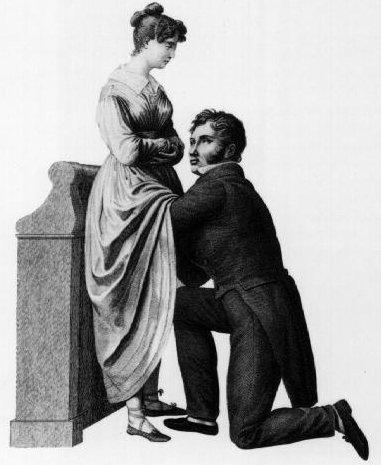
An 1822 illustration of a gynaecological examination

The word vulva is Latin for "womb". It derives from the 1540s in referring to the womb and female sexual organs, from the earlier volvere meaning to turn, roll or revolve, with further derivatives such as used in volvox, and volvulus (twisted bowel). The naming of the female (and male) genitals as pudenda membra, meaning parts to be ashamed of, dates from the mid-17th century. The naming influenced the general perception of the vulva and this is shown in depicted gynaecological procedures. The examiner shown in the Obstetrical examination dated 1822, is adopting the compromise procedure where the woman's genitals cannot be seen.

=== Terminology ===
In 2021, a study in the UK showed that few are able to label the structure of the vulva correctly. There are many sexual slang terms used for the vulva. "Cunt", a medieval word for the vulva and once the standard term, has become a vulgarism, and in other uses one of the strongest offensive and abusive swear words in English-speaking cultures. The word has been replaced in normal usage by a few euphemisms including "pussy" (vulgar slang) and "fanny" (UK), which used to be a common pet name. In the UK, these terms have other non-sexual meanings that lend themselves to double entendres, such as "pussy", which is used as a term of endearment for a pet cat, "pussy cat". In North American informal use, the term "pussy" can also refer to a weak or effeminate man, and "fanny" is a term used for the buttocks. Other slang terms are "muff", "snatch", and "twat". "Vagina" is often incorrectly used as a synonym for vulva since it is separate from that anatomy.

=== Religion and art ===
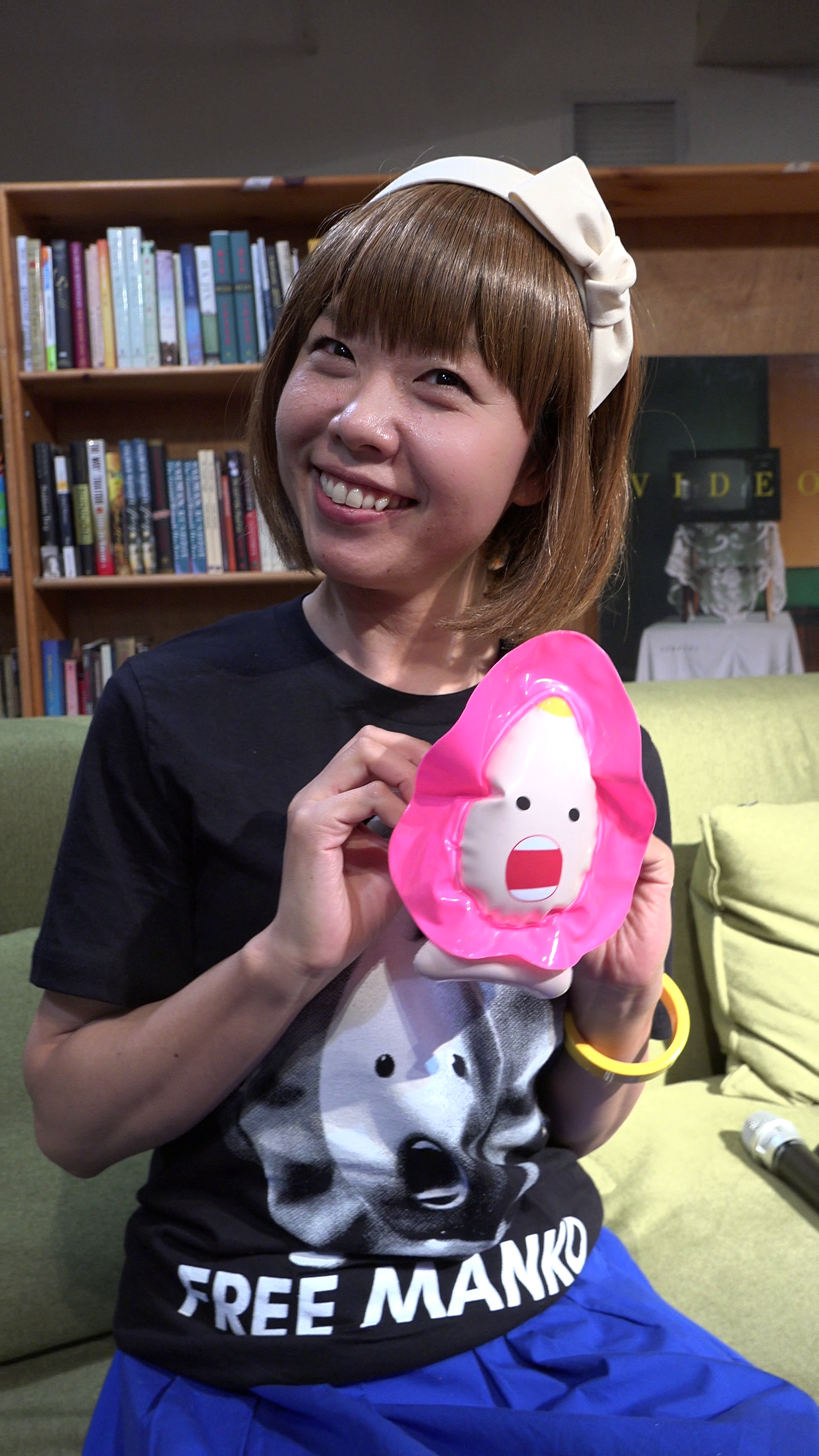
Japanese artist Megumi Igarashi with vulva portrayal

Some cultures have long celebrated and even worshipped the vulva. During the Uruk period (c. 4000–3100 BC), the ancient Sumerians regarded the vulva as sacred and a vast number of Sumerian poems praising the vulva of Inanna, the goddess of love, sex, and fertility, have survived. In Sumerian religion, the goddess Ninimma is the divine personification of the vulva. Vaginal fluid is always described in Sumerian texts as tasting "sweet" and, in a Sumerian bridal hymn, a young maiden rejoices that her vulva has grown hair. Clay models of vulvas were discovered in the temple of Inanna at Ashur.

Some major Hindu traditions such as Shaktism, a goddess-centered tradition, revere the vulva and vagina under the name yoni. The goddess as Devi is worshipped as the supreme deity. The yoni is a representation of the female deity and is found in many temples as a focus for prayer and offerings. It is also represented symbolically as a mudra in spiritual practices, including yoga.

Sheela na gigs are figurative carvings of naked women displaying an exaggerated vulva. They are found in ancient and medieval European contexts. They are displayed on many churches, but their origin and significance is debatable. A main line of thinking is that they were used to ward off evil spirits. Another view is that the sheela na gig was a divine assistant in childbirth. Starr Goode explores the image and possible meanings of the Sheela na gig and Baubo images in particular, but writes also about the recurring image worldwide. Through hundreds of photographs, she demonstrates that the image of a female displaying her vulva is not specific to European religious art or architecture, but that similar images are found in the visual arts and in mythical narratives of goddesses and heroines parting their thighs to reveal what she calls, "sacred powers". Her theory is that "the image is so rooted in our psyches that it seems as if the icon is the original cosmological center of the human imagination".

L'Origine du monde, an oil painting by Gustave Courbet

L'Origine du monde (Origin of the World), painted by Gustave Courbet in 1866, was an early Realist painting of a vulva that only became exhibited many years later. The painting was commissioned by Ottoman diplomat Halil Şerif Paşa. The woman used as the model for the painting was probably Halil's lover Constance Quéniaux. However, another potential model is Marie-Anne Detourbay, who was also a lover of Halil Şerif Pasha.

Japanese sculptor and manga artist Megumi Igarashi has focused much of her work on painting and modelling vulvas and vulva-themed works. She has used molds to create dioramas – three-dimensional models of her vulva with the hope of demystifying the female genitals.

An art installation called The Dinner Party by feminist artist, Judy Chicago, portrays a symbolic history of famous women. The dinner plates each depict an elaborate vulval form and they are arranged in a triangular vulva shape. Another installation was made by British artist Jamie McCartney who used the casts of four hundred vulvas to create The Great Wall of Vagina in 2011. The casts are life-size. Explanations written by the project's sexual health adviser accompany these. The purpose of the artist was to "address some of the stigmas and misconceptions that are commonplace".

== Other animals ==
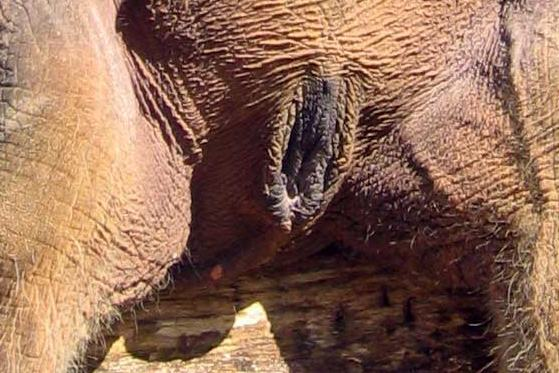
Vulva of an Asian elephant

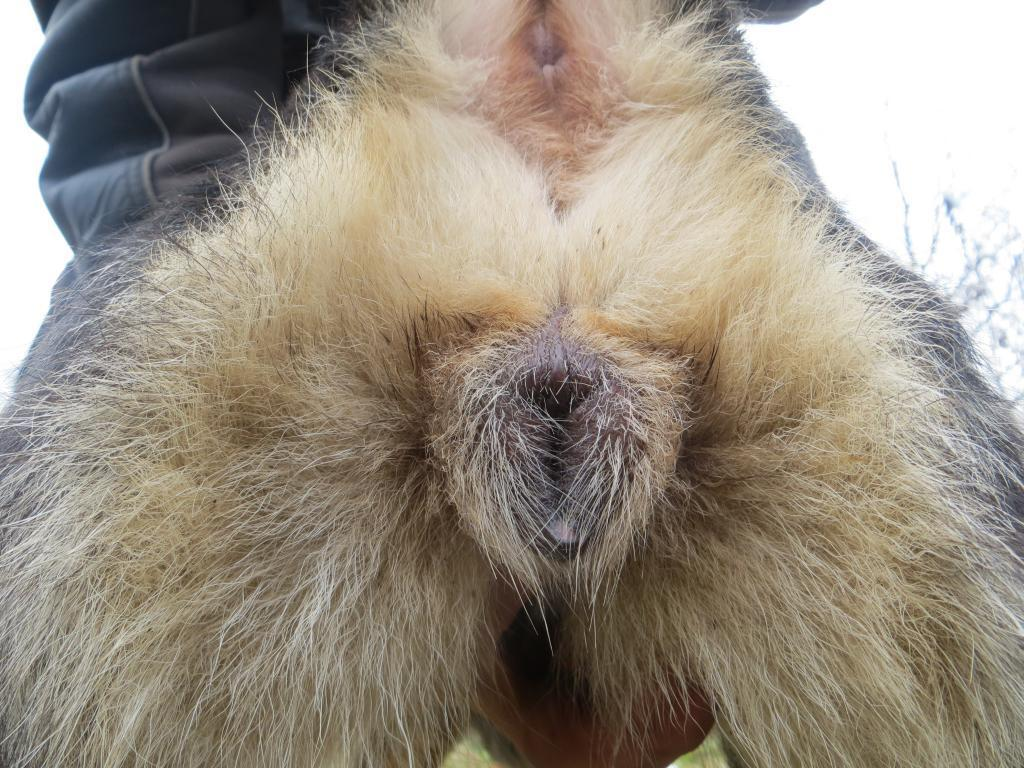
Vulva of a dog (German Shepherd)

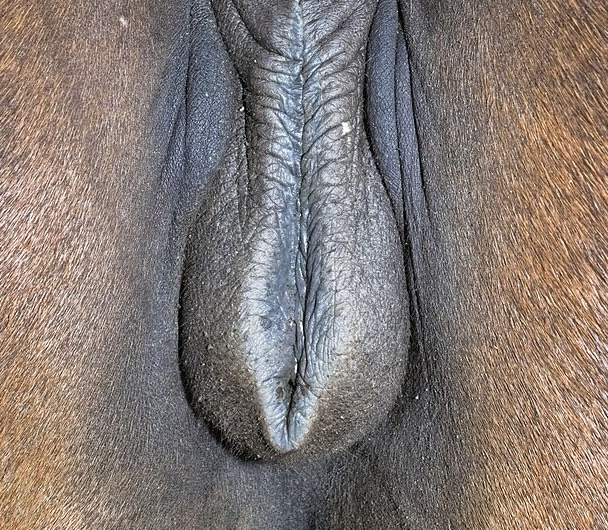
Vulva of a horse

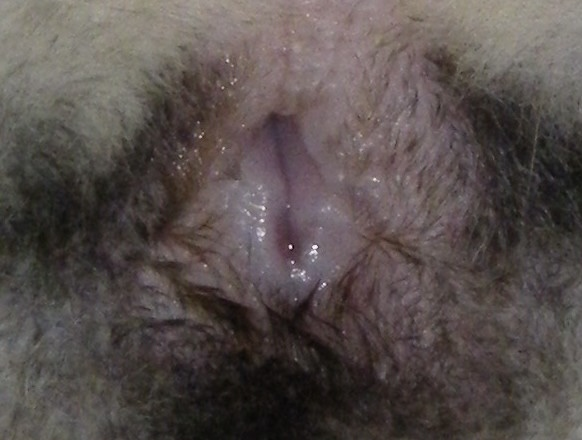
Vulva of a cat

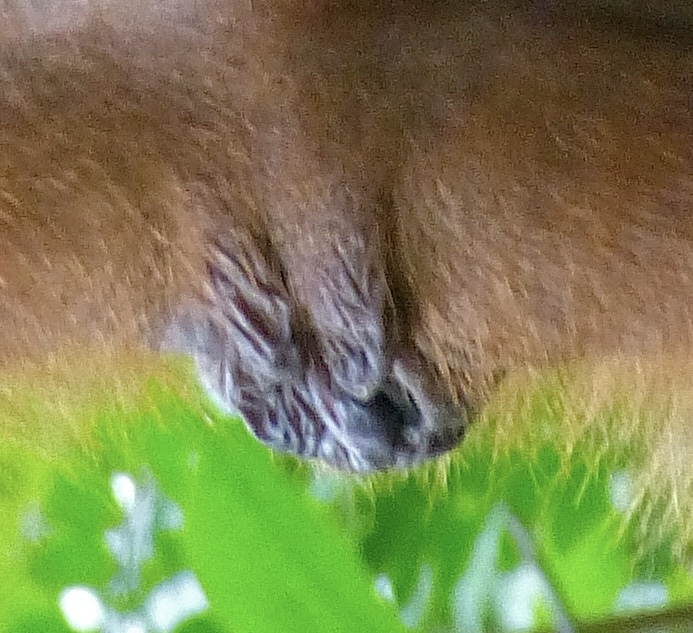
Vulva of a Bornean orangutan

As a rule, only the external female genitals of placental mammals are referred to as the "vulva", although the term is also used in the scientific literature for functionally comparable structures in other animal groups such as marsupials and roundworms (Nematoda).

For comparison, birds, reptiles, amphibians, and monotremes have a cloaca. An organ system that resembles a vulva does not exist for these animals.

The vulva of a placental consists of the following along with its variations:

- Clitoris: Made up of the root, glans and body and is usually retracted into a prepuce. Inside the clitoris of many non-human placentals is the baubellum, a small bone that possibly has origins in copulation. In horses and dogs, the clitoris is contained in clitoral fossa, which is a small pouch of tissue.
- Labia: A small, thin pair of lip-like structures that protect the vestibule. They are known as the labia vulvae in carnivorans and ungulates and as the labia minora in primates. The labia majora only exist in primates (including humans). Afrotherians do not have distinguishable labia.
- Vestibule/vulvar opening: In humans, other great apes, and some rodents, the vestibule is a flat and short external space that contains separate urethral and vaginal openings. In most other placentals, the urethra and vagina join as an internal vestibule (urogenital sinus), hence both urine and offspring exit through an orifice called the vulvar opening.

During estrus, the clitoris of a mare (female horse) everts as the labia contracts by opening and closing. This is colloquially known as "winking". Throughout the menstrual cycle, some female primates' vulvar and anal regions will swell (sexual swelling) to attract a male, though the fundamental reason for this function is up for debate.

The vulva of a spotted hyena has a large clitoris known as a pseudo-penis for copulating, giving birth and urinating, as well as fused labia (pseudo-scrotum). This can make it difficult to correctly sex the species.

== Additional images ==
Vulva hand sign used as a yogic mudra

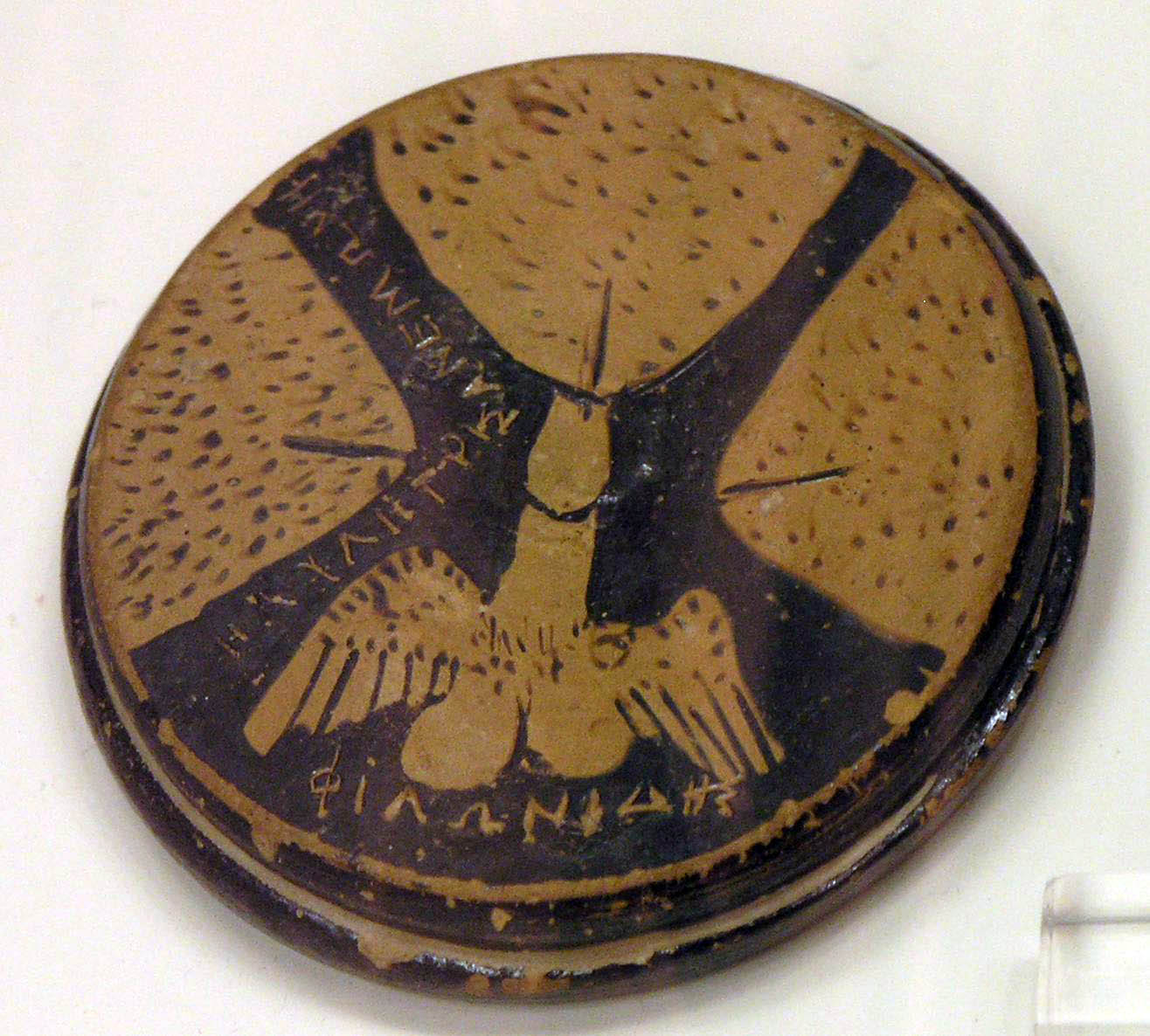
Attic red-figure lid depicting three vulvae and a winged penis

== See also ==
- Artificial vulva
- Blue vulva
- Camel toe
- Carpel
- Clitoral enlargement
- Elongated labia
- Epigyne
- Genital ulcer
- Human external male genitalia
  - Penis
  - Scrotum
- Koro (disease)
- Mammalian penis
- Pussyhat
- Vulvar myiasis
