= Clitoral hood piercing =

Type of body piercing

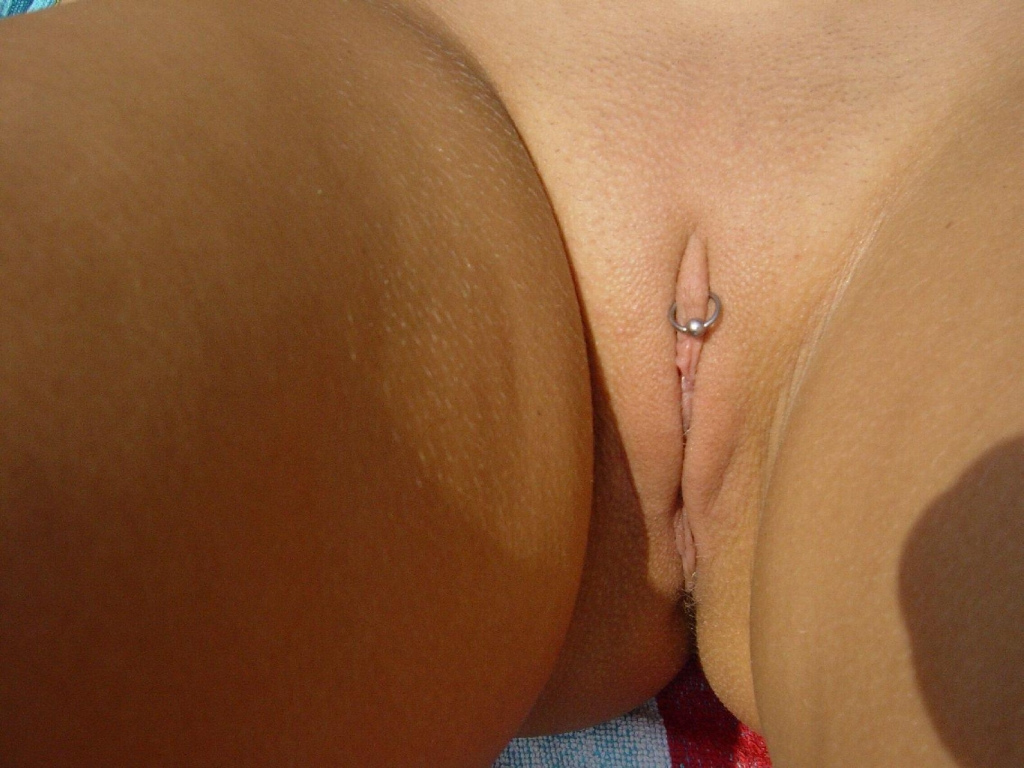
- Horizontal clitoral hood piercing with captive bead ring
- Nicknames: VCH, HCH
- Location: Clitoral hood
- Jewelry: Captive bead ring, barbell, J-bar
- Healing: 8–12 weeks

A clitoral hood piercing is a female genital piercing through the clitoral hood surrounding the clitoris. In addition to being an adornment, a clitoral hood piercing can enhance sexual pleasure during masturbation, foreplay and intercourse.

In an empirical study at the University of South Alabama, the authors reported a positive relationship between vertical clitoral hood piercings and desire, frequency of intercourse, and sexual arousal.

There are two main types of clitoral hood piercing: the vertical clitoral hood (VCH) piercing and the horizontal clitoral hood (HCH) piercing. As the names indicate, the difference is in the direction the piercing is oriented in the skin above the clitoris. Neither of these piercings penetrates the clitoris itself, although in common language they are sometimes called "clit" piercings. The deep hood piercing is a variation of the clitoral hood piercing that passes deeper through the clitoral hood.

== Motivations ==
The clitoris is the human female's most sensitive erogenous zone and the primary anatomical source of human female sexual pleasure. The glans of the human clitoris is about the size of a pea but is estimated to have 8,000 to 10,000 sensory nerve endings, The extremely high density of sensory nerve endings in the glans of the clitoris enables it to be exceptionally sensitive to stimulation.

To enhance sexual pleasure, the piercing must provide stimulation to the clitoris. According to Cosmopolitan magazine, many people say the vertical clitoral hood piercing enhances sexual pleasure more than a horizontal clitoral hood piercing. The vertical orientation of the jewelry increases pressure on the clitoris, particularly if the lower sphere (bead) of a barbell is situated to apply pressure directly to the glans of the clitoris.

A clitoral hood piercing may be desired as an adornment, either on its own, or in association with other body piercings. Some people say that even if they were the only person who ever saw their genital piercings, they would be happy with them.

For some who have been sexually assaulted, raped, sexually abused, or psychologically hurt in various ways, genital piercings serve as a means to reclaim their sexuality or their ownership of their genitals.

== Execution ==
The positioning of the piercing puts the rear of the jewellery in contact with the clitoris, allowing it to be stimulated.

== Pain, healing and aftercare ==
Compared to other piercings, clitoral hood piercings tend to be rather uncomplicated with regard to the piercing process itself as well as the healing, which certainly contributes to the popularity of the piercing. In contrast to common expectations, this piercing is no more painful to perform than other body piercings. Since the piercing passes through a thin layer of tissue, it is quick to pierce and reportedly hurts less than ear piercings. Clitoral hood piercings also have rather short healing times, due to the amount of blood circulation to the area. The average healing time is 8–12 weeks.

== Gallery ==
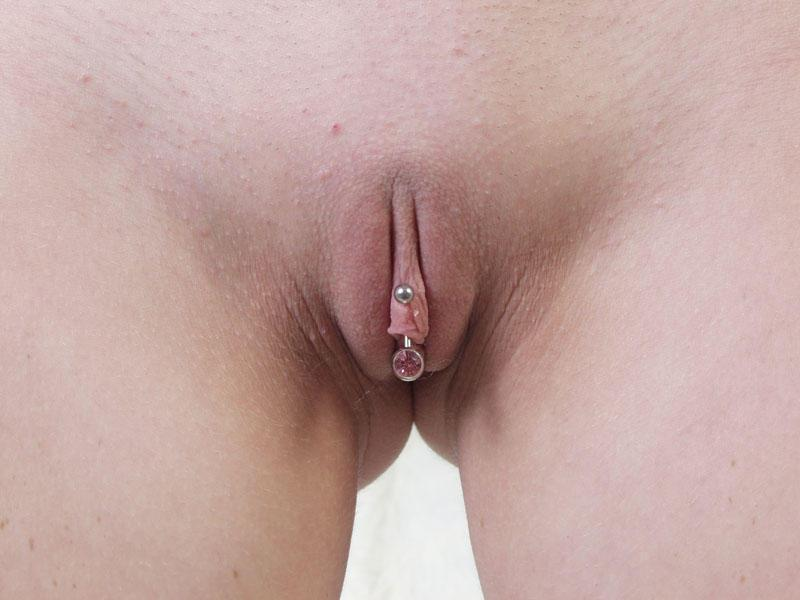
Frontal view of a vertical clitoral hood (VCH) piercing with curved barbell

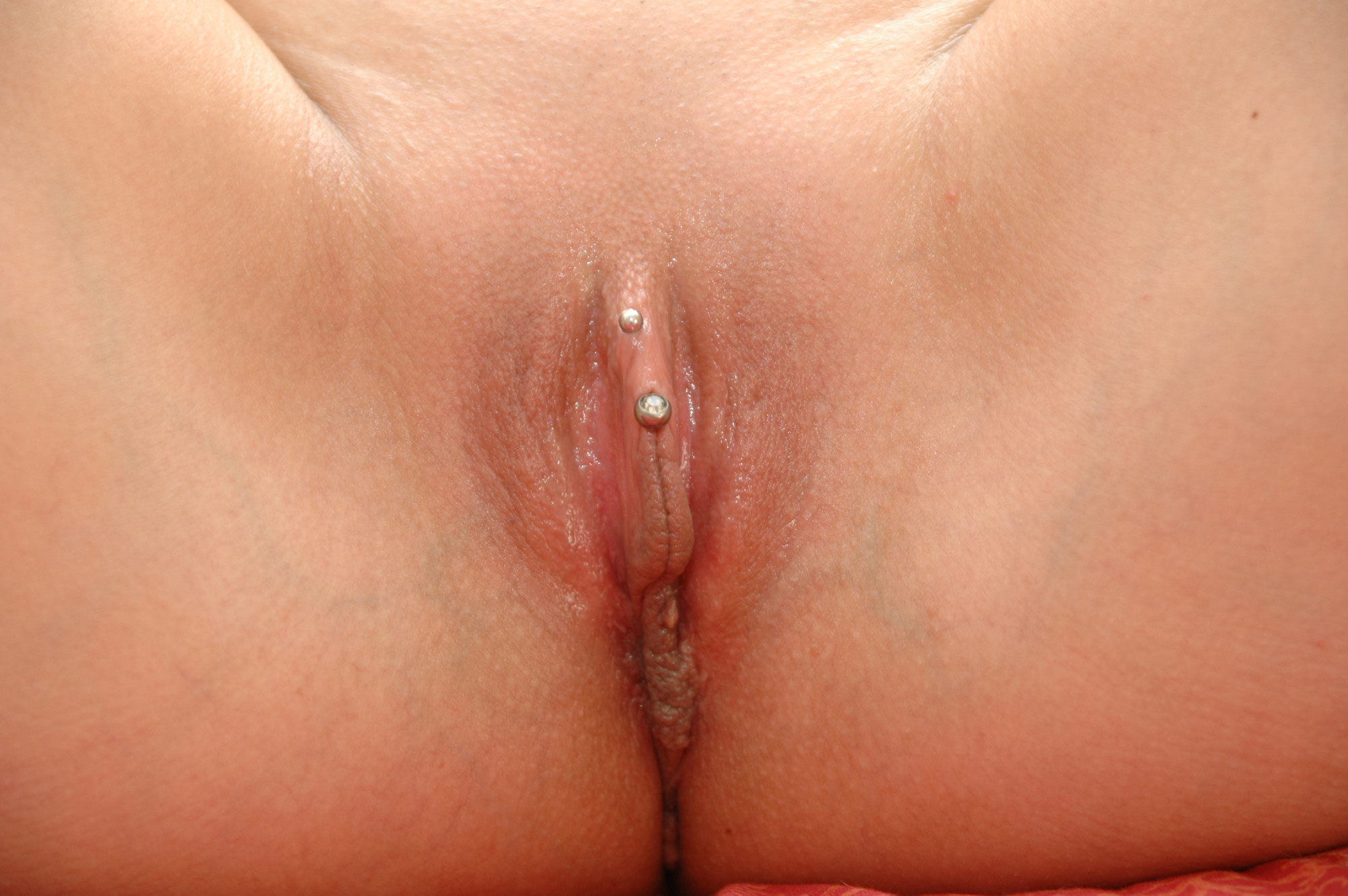
Linear view of a vertical clitoral hood (VCH) piercing

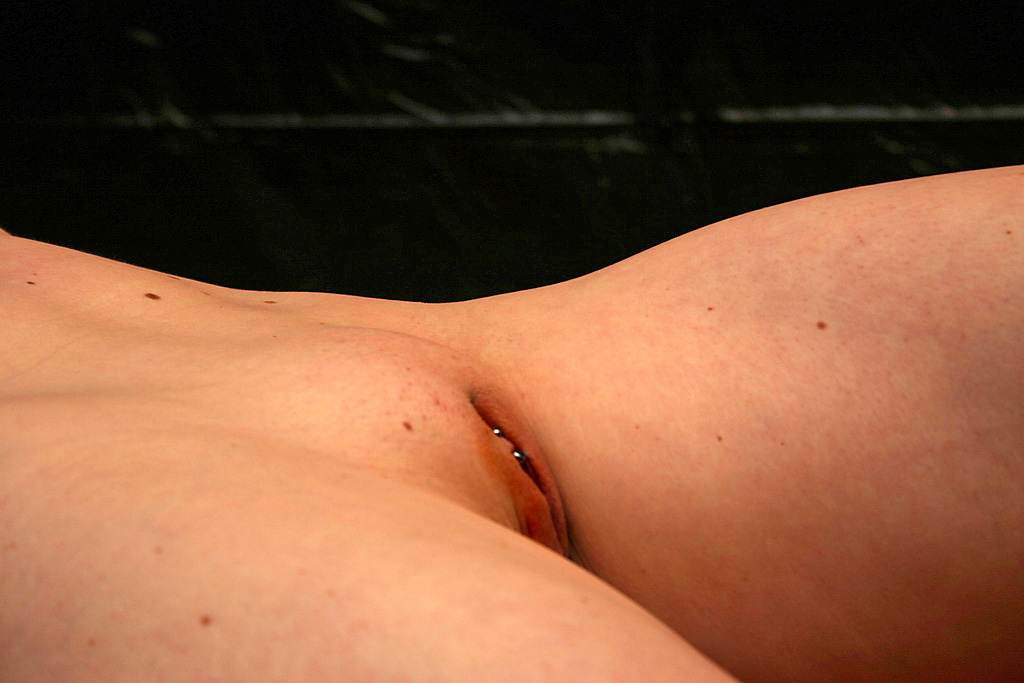
Side view of a vertical clitoral hood (VCH) piercing

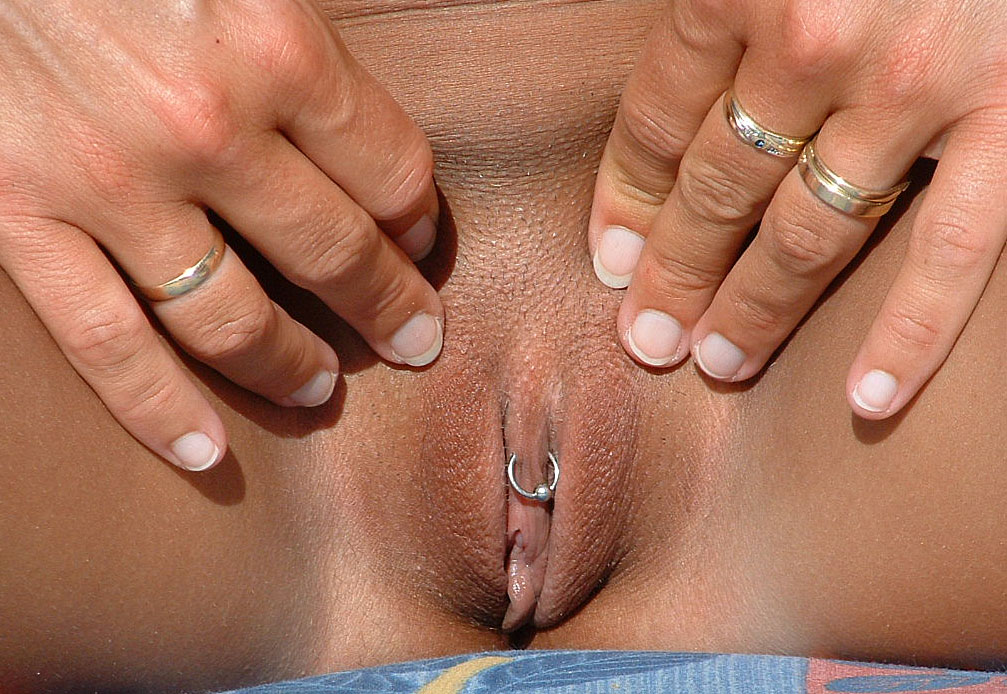
Horizontal clitoral hood (HCH) piercing with captive bead ring

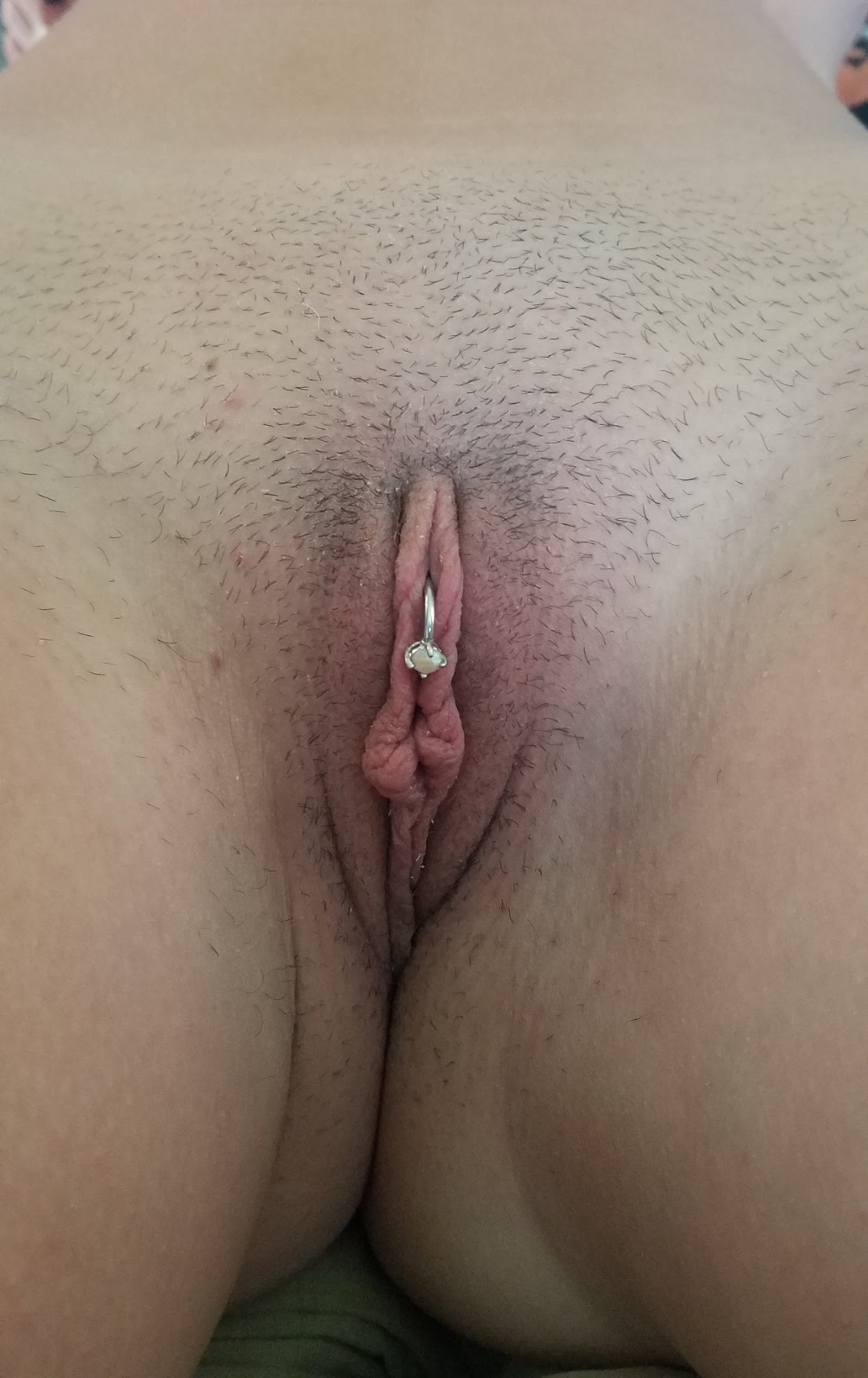
VCH with a captive bead ring

== See also ==
- Christina piercing
- Clitoris piercing
- Foreskin piercing
- Fourchette piercing
- Genital piercing
- Isabella piercing
- Labia piercing
- Nefertiti piercing
- Princess Albertina piercing
- Triangle piercing
