= Mons pubis =

Rounded mass of fatty tissue found over the pubic symphysis

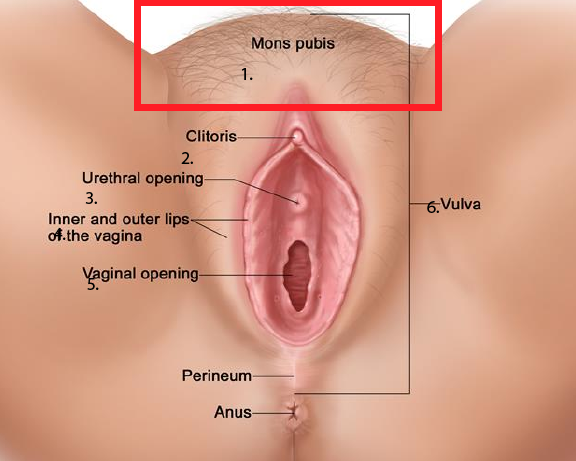

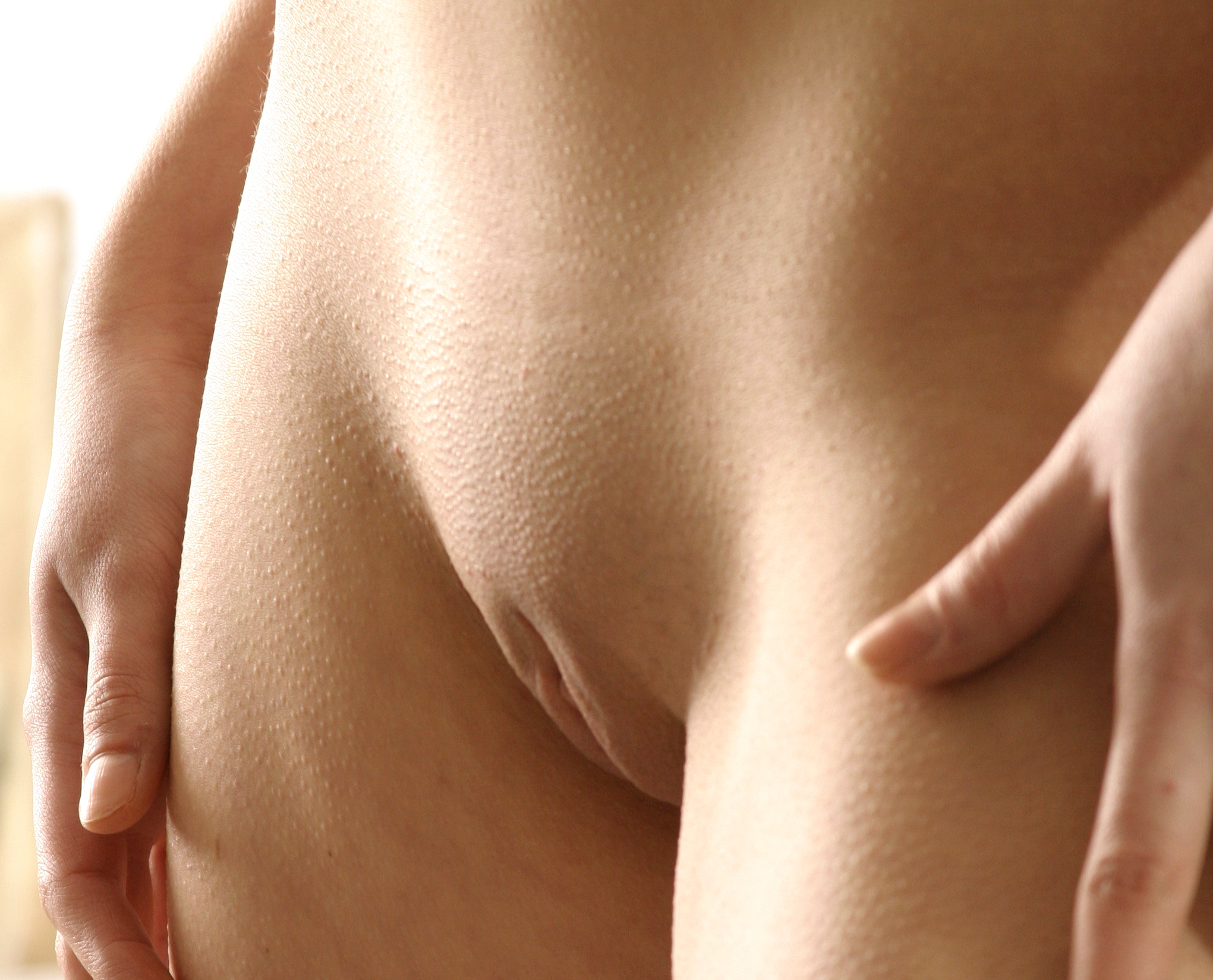

Details
- Precursor: Genital tubercle

Identifiers
- Latin: mons pubis
- TA98: A09.2.01.002
- TA2: 3548
- FMA: 20218

In human anatomy, and in mammals in general, the mons pubis or pubic mound (also known simply as the mons /mɒnz/), and known specifically in females as the mons Venus or the older term mons veneris, is a rounded mass of fatty tissue found over the pubic symphysis of the pubic bones.

== Structure ==
For females, the mons pubis forms the anterior and superior portion of the vulva. It divides into the labia majora (literally 'larger lips'), on either side of the furrow known as the pudendal cleft that surrounds the rest of the vulvar parts: labia minora, clitoris, urinary meatus, vaginal opening, and vulval vestibule.

Although present in both men and women, the mons pubis tends to be larger in women. Before puberty, the mons pubis is relatively flat and hairless. Its fatty tissue is sensitive to estrogen, causing a distinct mound to form with the onset of female puberty. This pushes the forward portion of the labia majora out and away from the pubic bone. Increased androgen activity can cause the skin of the mons pubis to be covered with coarse pubic hair. During menopause, the pubic hair can thin out and the mons pubis decreases in size.

== Etymology ==
The term mons pubis is derived from Latin for "pubic mound". The more specifically female mons Venus or the older term mons veneris is derived from Latin for "mound of Venus".

== Society and culture ==
Although not part of external genitalia itself, the pubic mound can be regarded as an erogenous zone and is highly eroticized in many cultures. Throughout history, the complete or partial removal of pubic hair has been common in many societies, and more recently it has become widespread in the Western world. The removal of all pubic hair has become common practice in the 21st century primarily due to societal pressures and personal preferences. There are several popular removal methods including shaving and waxing, such as a Brazilian wax.

In some circumstances, the mons pubis is subjected to aesthetic ideals beyond hair removal. Correspondingly, plastic surgery is offered, which alters the shape of the mons to a desired ideal.

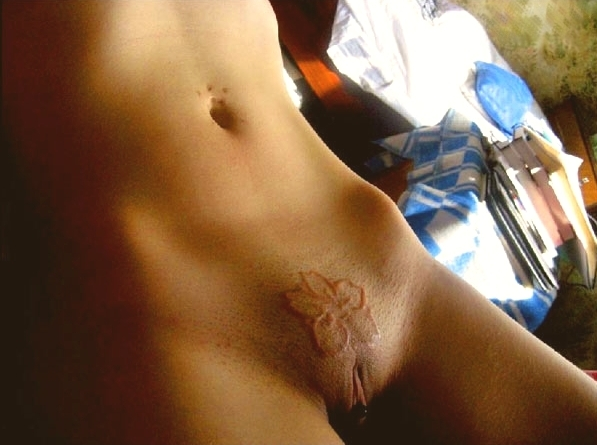
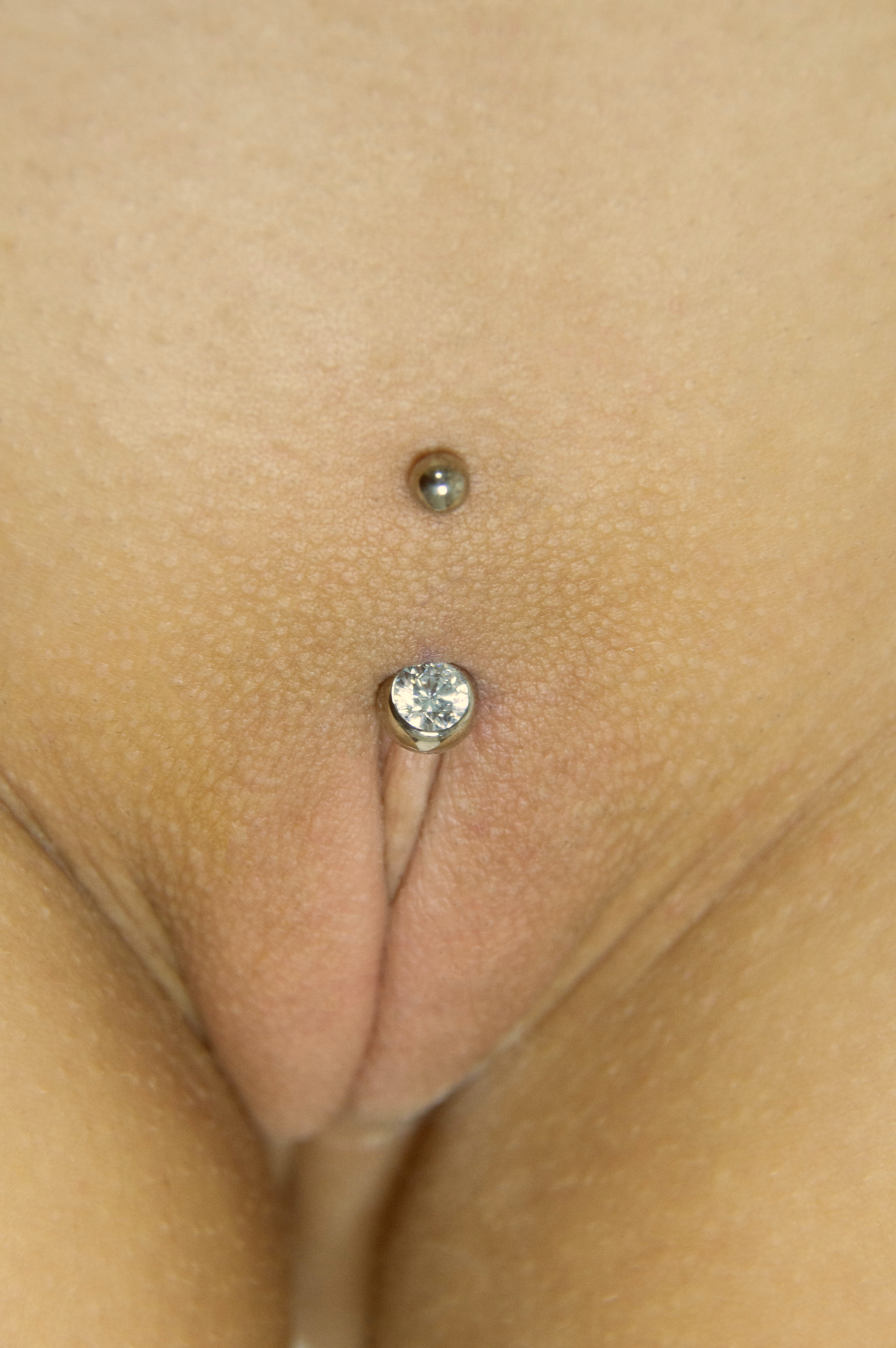
Aesthetic modifications of the mons pubis include scarification tattoos (left) and genital piercings such as the Christina piercing (right).

Permanent forms of decoration to enhance the aesthetic appeal of this area are hanabira (the application of cosmetic scars) or piercings such as the Christina piercing or the Nefertiti piercing. Vajazzling refers to the non-permanent decoration of the mons pubis with crystal ornaments. Genital tattooing is also common in this area using traditional ink as well as temporary henna designs or mehndi.

Although laws prohibiting indecent exposure usually make it illegal to expose the genitals in public, there are some garments that expose the mons pubis. For example, in 1985, four weeks before his death, Rudi Gernreich unveiled the pubikini, a topless bathing suit that exposed the wearer's mons pubis and pubic hair. It was a thin, V-shaped, thong-style bottom that in the front featured a tiny strip of fabric. The pubikini was described as a pièce de résistance totally freeing the human body.

== Gallery ==
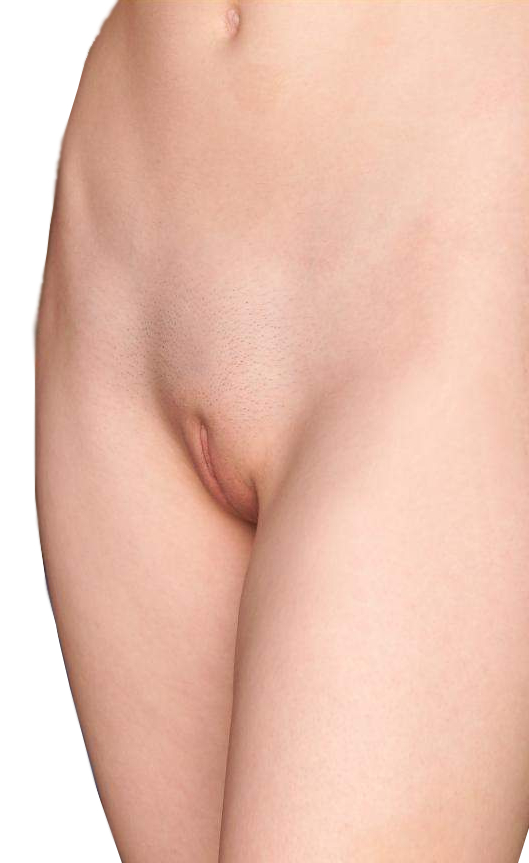
Mons pubis without pubic hair viewed from the front

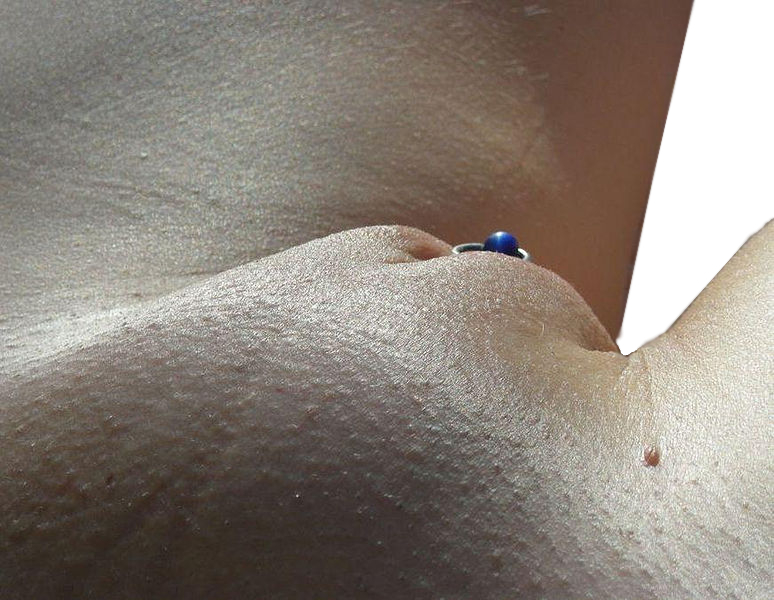
Mons Venus (with genital piercing), viewed from above

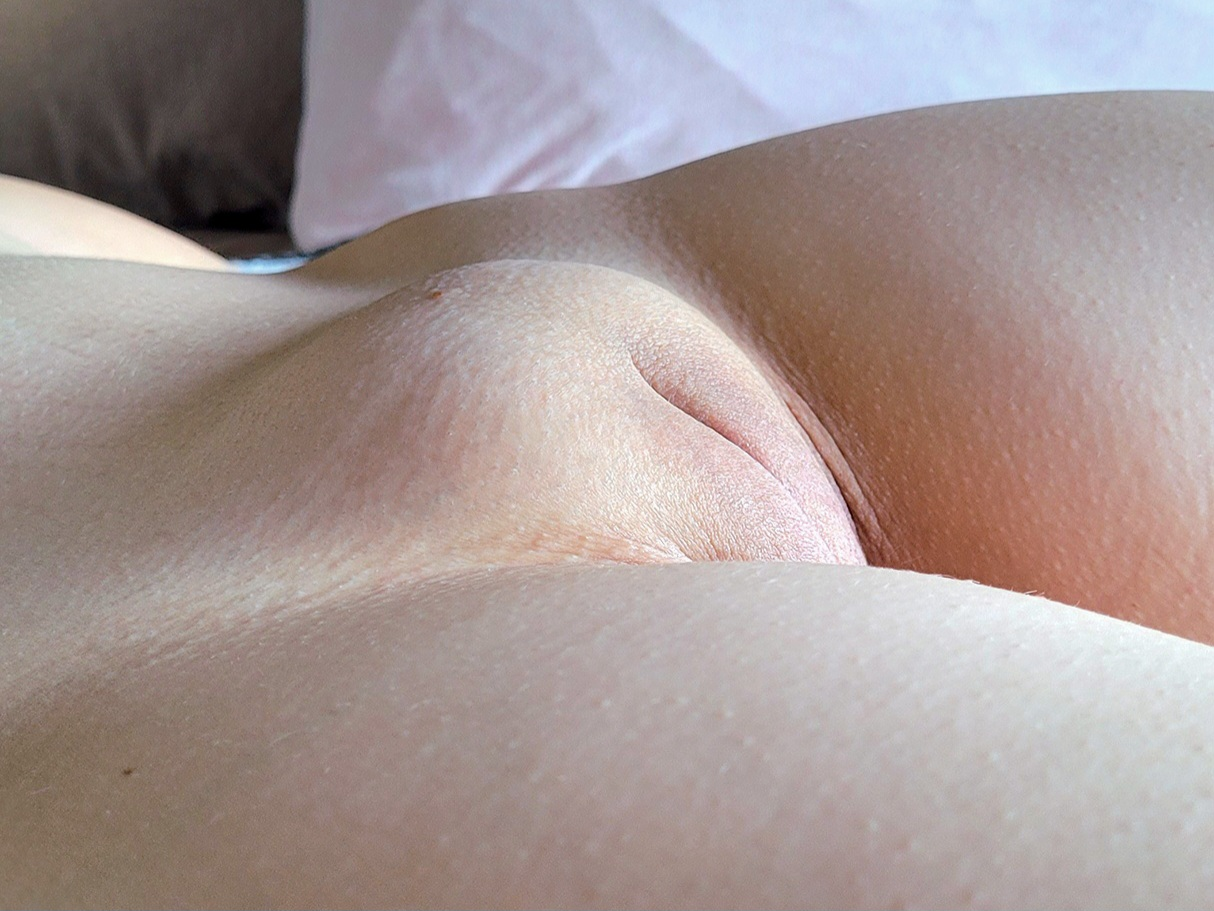
Prominent Mons Venus (lateral view)

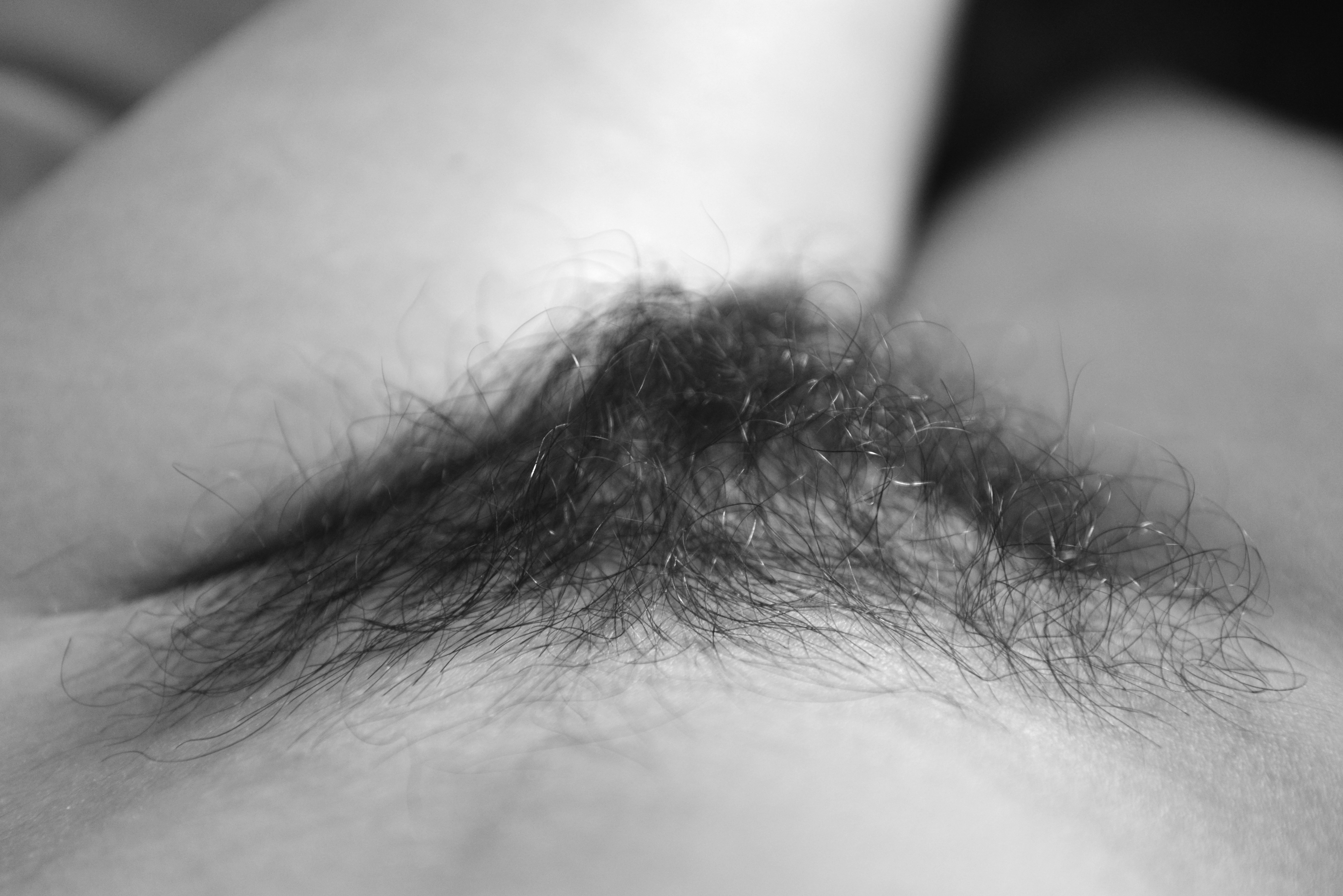
Mons pubis with pubic hair

Adult female mons pubis with blond pubic hair front lateral view

== Bibliography ==
- Sloane, Ethel. Biology of Women. Cengage Learning 2002, ISBN 978-0-7668-1142-3, p. 31
- Gray, Henry: Anatomy of the Human Body. Lea & Febiger, 1918
- "Mons pubis" in Encyclopædia Britannica Online. 2010.
