= Deep shaft piercing =

Type of genital piercing

Deep shaft piercings are piercings which pass through the penile shaft. They are most commonly seen in the form of deeply placed ampallangs, apadravyas, and reverse shaft Prince Alberts. They are more rare piercings due to associated pain, difficulty, bleeding and long healing times. Common placement is directly behind the head of the penis, but they can be placed further back.

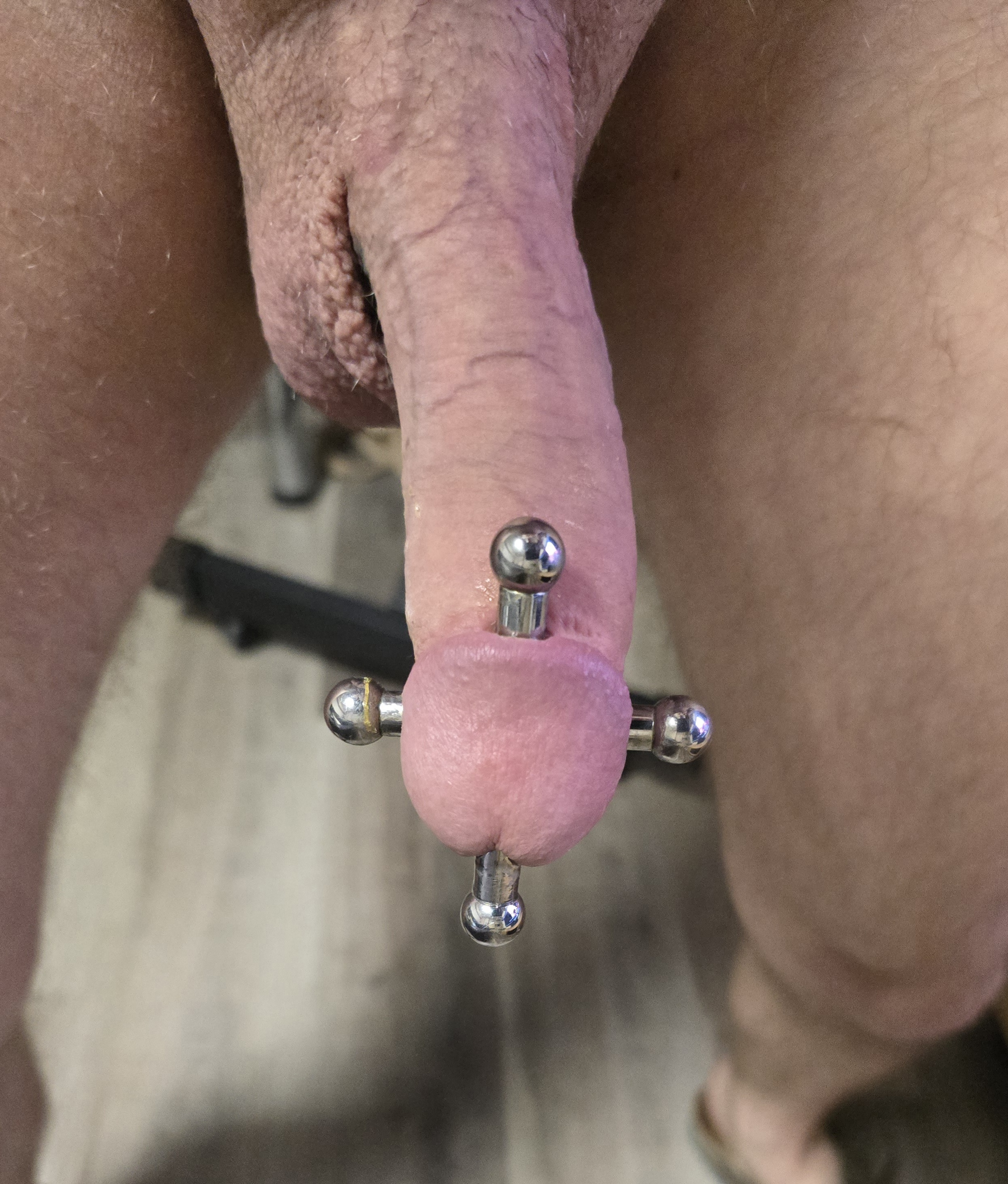
Deep shaft ampallang and deep shaft reverse Prince Albert

== See also ==
- Isabella piercing, the female equivalent
