= Princess Albertina piercing =

Female genital piercing

Princess Albertina
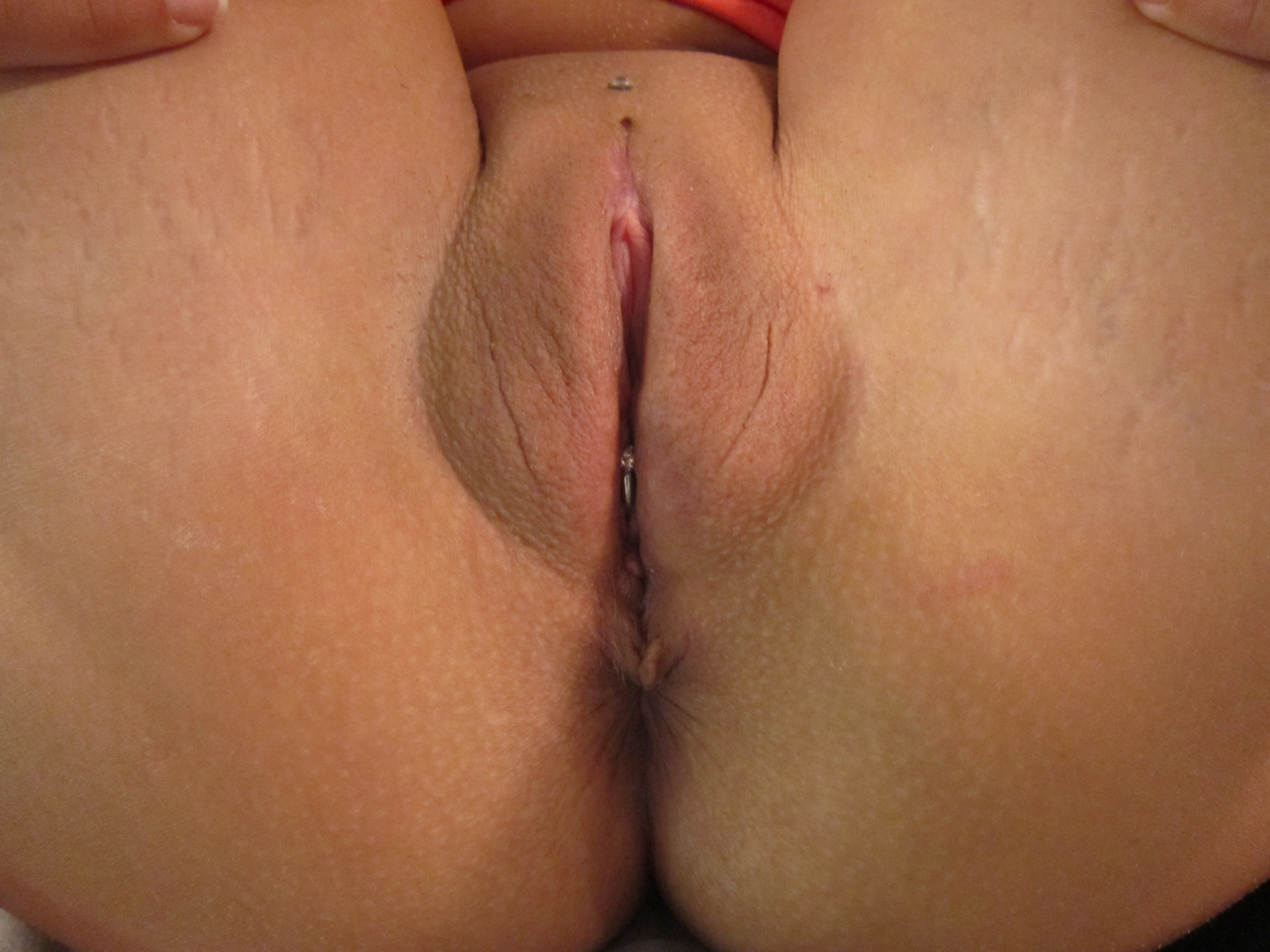
- Princess Albertina piercing (lower part of the picture), in addition to labiaplasty, clitoral hood reduction and transdermal implant
- Location: Urethra, vagina, vulva

Princess Albertina is a female genital piercing, where a ring enters the urethra and exits through the top of the vulva. Anne Greenblatt described the Princess Albertina to Ralph H. in 1995 as a "relatively new and experimental piercing." Its name comes from the fact that it is analogous to the male Prince Albert piercing.

== Circumstances ==
This is a relatively rare piercing, as placement is difficult and the potential for urinary tract infections (UTI) may be increased by this piercing. This piercing requires the bearer to have a large enough urethra for it to be viable. This piercing can be extremely sexually stimulating, as its presence stimulates the nerves of the urethra during intercourse or masturbation. While many male genital piercings are transurethral, the longer length of the male urethra reduces the risk of urinary tract infection due to transurethral piercings. The presence of this piercing can alter or divert the flow of urine from the body and may cause complications from urination.
