= Isabella piercing =

Female genital piercing

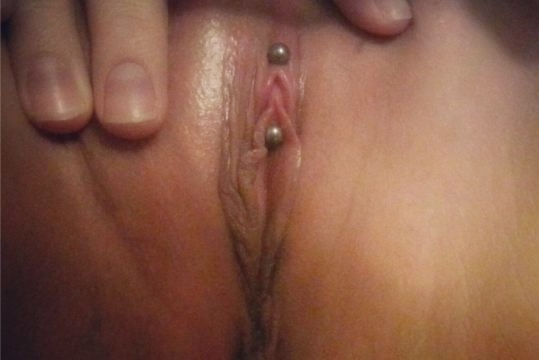
- Location: Clitoral shaft
- Jewelry: Barbell
- Healing: 2 to 3 months

Isabella piercing is a female genital piercing. It is a deep clitoral shaft piercing that starts below the clitoris and above the urethra, which goes up through the clitoral shaft and exits at the top of the hood.

The Isabella piercing was first documented in issue 17 of Piercing World Magazine. As an Isabella piercing intersects the shaft of the clitoris, it is considered to be high risk for nerve damage and is therefore extremely rare. Like other female genital piercings, the Isabella piercing is anatomy-dependent. Nerve damage can result from piercing a clitoris that is too small or from piercing through the shaft of the clitoris and through the dorsal nerve. Piercing through the shaft of the clitoris can also result in excessive bleeding and blood loss to the clitoris. Healing time is 2-3 months. The Nefertiti piercing was invented in response to the inherent dangers involved with the Isabella piercing.

== Jewelry ==
Isabellas are usually pierced with custom made barbells usually in 16 to 14 gauge and 5/16 in to 7/16 in.

== See also ==
- Christina piercing
- Clitoris piercing
- Deep shaft piercing
- Nefertiti piercing
