= Nefertiti piercing =

Female genital piercing

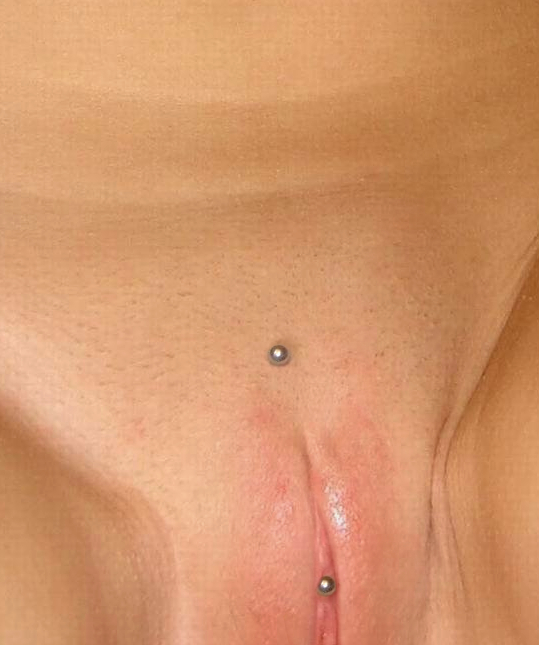
- Location: Clitoral hood, labium
- Jewelry: Flexible bar

A Nefertiti piercing is a female genital piercing that is a combination of a vertical clitoral hood piercing and a Christina piercing.

== History ==
The origins of the Nefertiti piercing dates back to the late 1990s and early 2000s within the United States. Tattoo artist Shane Munce is the most widely credited person of the prominence of the piercing.

A key factor in its development was to serve as a safer alternative to the more dangerous Isabella Piercing, another female genital piercing that may result in nerve damage or loss of sensation. The piercing was created in order to solve a safety crisis by merging two existing techniques into a single vertical placement, as piercers would need that kind of look. They connected the Christina piercing at the top of the pubic mound and through the exit of a Vertical Clitoral Hood piercing (VCH) . This bypassed the nerves in order to avoid the complications of the Isabella piercing.

The piercing is named after Queen Nefertiti of Ancient Egypt, for inspiration from her famously long neckline. Reflecting with prominence and elegance, even though there is no historical evidence of the practice of this piercing during the ancient Egyptian period.

== Design and placement ==
The Nefertiti piercing goes through the area near the mons pubis and exiting at the clitoral hood. It is not a straight tunnel, but more of as a curvature in the perforation, leading to the curved barbell.

== Jewellery ==
Jewellery consists of a curved barbell, typically in a 14g (1.6mm) or a 12g (2.0mm) gauge depending on anatomy and practitioner preference. The most common used material is implant grade titanium due to its biocompatibility and low risk of allergic reactions. Flexible bars are sometimes used because of the pressure that can be put on the piercing from passing through so much flesh.

== Risks ==
Healing can be lengthy, given the amount of tissue the jewelry must pass through. Many sources suggest that 6-12 months is the initial healing time. Complications can occur, such as:

- Infection, the risk of bacterial infection increases if aftercare is not followed or keeps being delayed.
- Migration, commonly known as the “cheese cutter effect” can occur over time, especially in this kind of location.
- Rejection, which depends on the person and aftercare and becomes pushed out of the wound for it to heal.
