= Christina piercing =

Female genital piercing

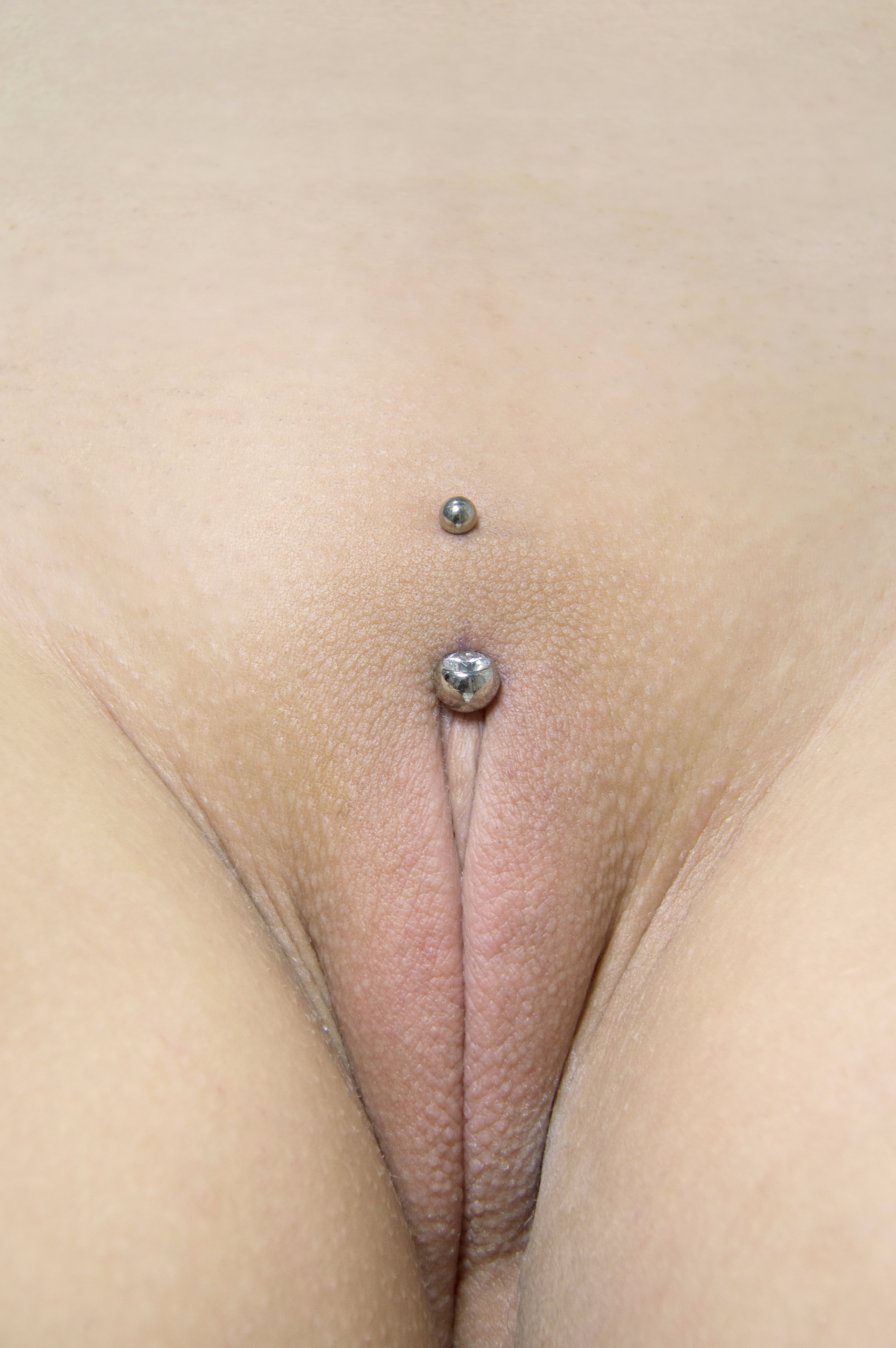
- Location: Mons pubis
- Jewelry: Curved barbell
- Healing: 6–7 months

A Christina piercing, also known as a Venus piercing, is a female genital piercing. It is located where the outer labia meet, below the pubic mound. The Christina piercing is anatomy dependent; it has a high rejection rate, and is not possible for all women due to anatomical variation. If the flesh above the clitoris where the outer labia meet is fleshy enough to pinch, a Christina piercing may be successful. If the flesh in this area is too tight to pinch, a Christina piercing may be contraindicated. The piercing does not facilitate sexual stimulation and can be found uncomfortable when pressure is applied. It is usually pierced with either a custom-made curved barbell or surface bar to reduce the risk of rejection.

The Christina piercing is of contemporary origin. The first known Christina piercing was performed in the 1990s. As is common practice in the piercing industry, it was named after the first recipient of the piercing, a woman named Christina. It is also occasionally referred to by the less commonly used term "Venus", in reference to its placement at the mons Venus.

The piercing usually heals in two to four months. However, complications may occur depending on jewelry and the pierced person's anatomy. In some cases, it is performed as a surface piercing. Further difficulties can develop due to the relatively long piercing canal and constant movement and friction. Christina piercings may also be susceptible to infection.

== See also ==
- Nefertiti piercing – Female genital piercing
