= Tongue piercing =

Type of body piercing

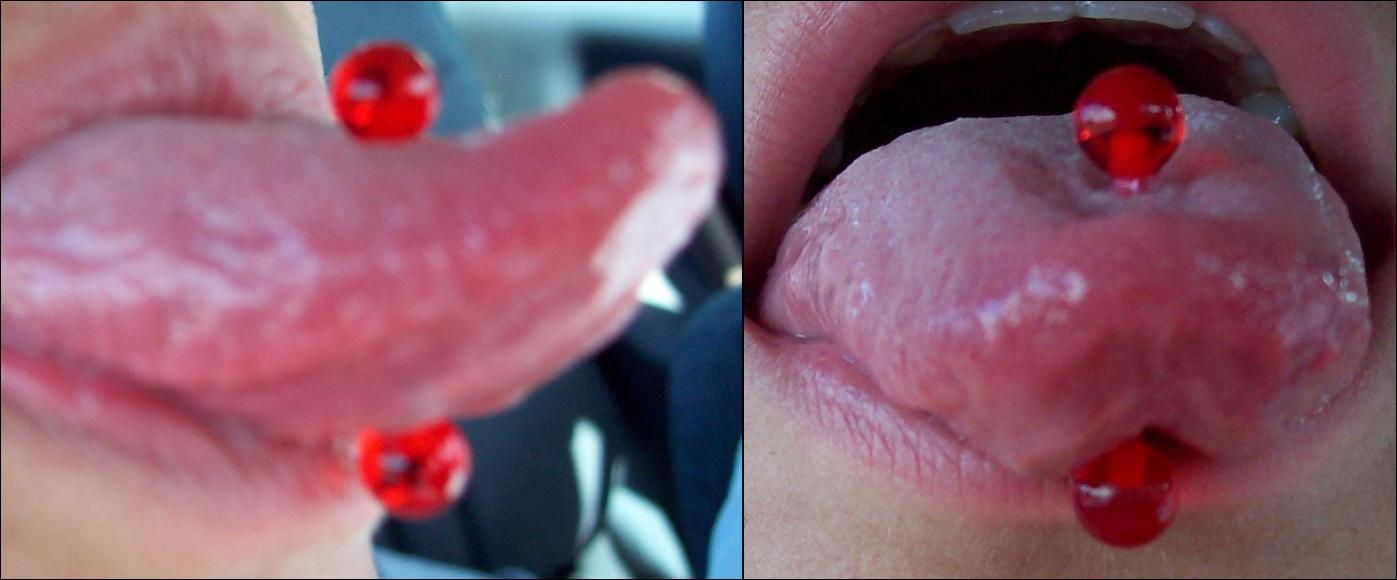
- Location: Tongue
- Jewelry: Straight barbell
- Healing: 2 to 4 weeks, total healing takes about 2 months.

A tongue piercing is a type of body piercing usually done directly through the center of the tongue. Since its decline in popularity around 2011, it has seen a recent upsurge making it now the second most popular piercing amongst young women aged 16–25 in 2019. It has become quite unpopular amongst men, although in the 1990s and early 2000s, it was more popular for men than women to get and associated with punk culture. Midline tongue piercings, or one hole through the center of the tongue is the most common way to have the tongue pierced.

== History and culture ==
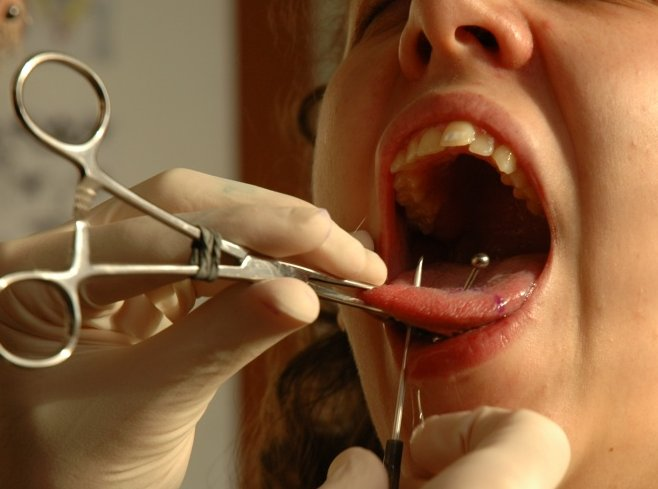
Piercing in progress

The term "tongue ring" is often used to refer to tongue piercing, but this is not accurate as rings are rarely worn in tongue piercings.

There is a history of ritual tongue piercing in Aztec and Maya cultures. Priests would pierce their tongues and either draw blood from them or pass rough cords through to inflict pain. However, there is no evidence that the Aztecs practiced long-term or permanent tongue piercing, despite their use of other permanent body modifications, as it was done to honor their gods.

Tongue piercing has a long history in religious and performance practices. The Mesoamericans, such as the Aztecs, practiced this type of piercing as part of offerings to their deities. Similarly, Spirit Mediums in certain Australian tribes would practice tongue piercing as an offering and as a way to demonstrate their trance state.

From the turn of the 20th century, Western carnies borrowed many of their sideshow tricks from fakirs bringing to American and European audiences their first glimpses of tongue piercing.

Permanent or long term piercing of the tongue is part of the resurgence of body piercing in contemporary society. The ready availability of high quality, surgical steel barbell style jewelry is associated with the emergence of this piercing in the 1980s. As with many piercing innovations, the origin of this piercing is associated with Gauntlet, the first professional body piercing studio in the United States, formerly located in Los Angeles, California.

Tattoo Samy appeared in PFIQ (the first publication about body piercing) in issues #18 (1983) and #19 as the magazine's first documented tongue piercing.

Elayne Angel, the first person awarded the Master Piercer's certificate by Jim Ward, body piercing pioneer, and founder of Gauntlet, helped popularize this type of piercing.

== Jewelry ==
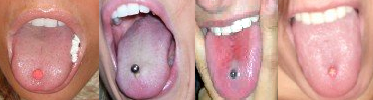
Straight barbells with either plastic or metal beads are commonly worn in tongue piercings.

Tongues are pierced with straight barbell style jewelry. Because of the frequent movement of the tongue, jewellery size and comfort is especially important. Barbells that are too thin are prone to migration, causing discomfort and irritation. Tongue piercings can often be easily stretched to accommodate larger jewellery. The initial piercing is often at 14 g (1.6 mm), but to avoid one or two stretching steps it is possible to pierce immediately at 12 g (2.0 mm) or even 10 g (2.4 mm).

Some people later choose to stretch their piercing to 12 g (2 mm), 10 g (2.4 mm), 8 g (3.2 mm) or 6 g (4.0 mm) to protect against possible migration, and to have a more stable 'snug' fit. It is possible to stretch further to diameters beyond 10 mm. The beads at the end of the barbell can be made of many decorative materials. "No-see-um beads", flat beads matching the color of the tongue, are sometimes worn to conceal this piercing, often in places of employment.

== Procedure ==
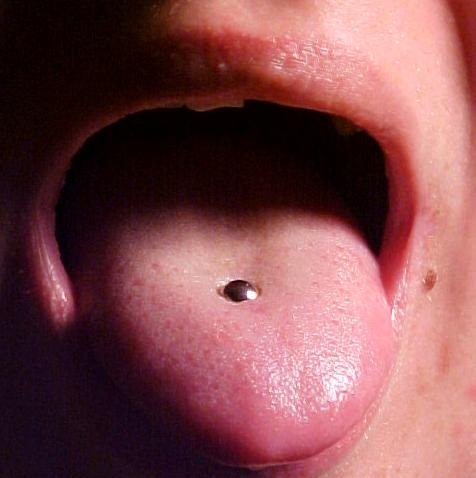
Tongues usually swell for a short period of time after being pierced.

=== Piercing ===
The piercer will check the underside of the tongue for large blood vessels, sometimes with a bright light, and mark a safe placement for the piercing. The tongue is then clamped with forceps, and pierced with a needle, usually from top to bottom with a piercing needle or from bottom to top with a cannula needle. Initial jewelry should always be considerably longer than will ultimately be required to allow for the swelling, which is common following the piercing. Within two days of getting the piercing the tongue can swell up to double its original size. This can lead to pain when speaking and eating, but this is not permanent.

Piercers often recommend drinking cold beverages, and sucking on crushed ice to help reduce the swelling. Some people find that taking Ibuprofen or similar anti-inflammatory drugs can greatly reduce the swelling associated with a tongue piercing. It is advisable not to drink alcohol, smoke or eat spicy food until the piercing is at least partially healed (around two weeks), and alcohol-free mouthwash should be used after eating or smoking.

After the swelling calms down, a period of mild tongue and oral mucosa irritation can follow, sometimes discouraging the recently pierced person from keeping the piercing. Appropriate mouth washing, care during meals, and some patience will usually be sufficient to come to a sufficiently healed state. After full healing the person is advised to replace the initial long barbell (to accommodate the initial swelling) with a shorter barbell. This second barbell is sometimes included in the price of the initial piercing procedure. It can be difficult for an inexperienced recently pierced person to replace the barbell with a shorter version, so often the help of the piercer is asked for.

The second barbell is usually 2 mm – 4 mm shorter than the initial barbell, but should be adapted to the individual anatomy. After this replacement a second (short) healing period is observed. In case of absence of irritation, the further stretching procedure can be started.

Because of the tongue's exceptional healing ability, piercings can close very fast. Even completely healed holes can close up in a matter of hours, and larger-stretched holes can close in just a few days. The length of time for the hole to heal varies greatly from person to person – some people with larger-stretched holes (greater than 4 g (5 mm)) can still fit jewelry (albeit smaller) in their piercing after months or even years.

It is generally recommended to avoid piercing in bodies under development or in people not capable of taking care of a recent piercing.

=== Placement of the tongue piercing ===
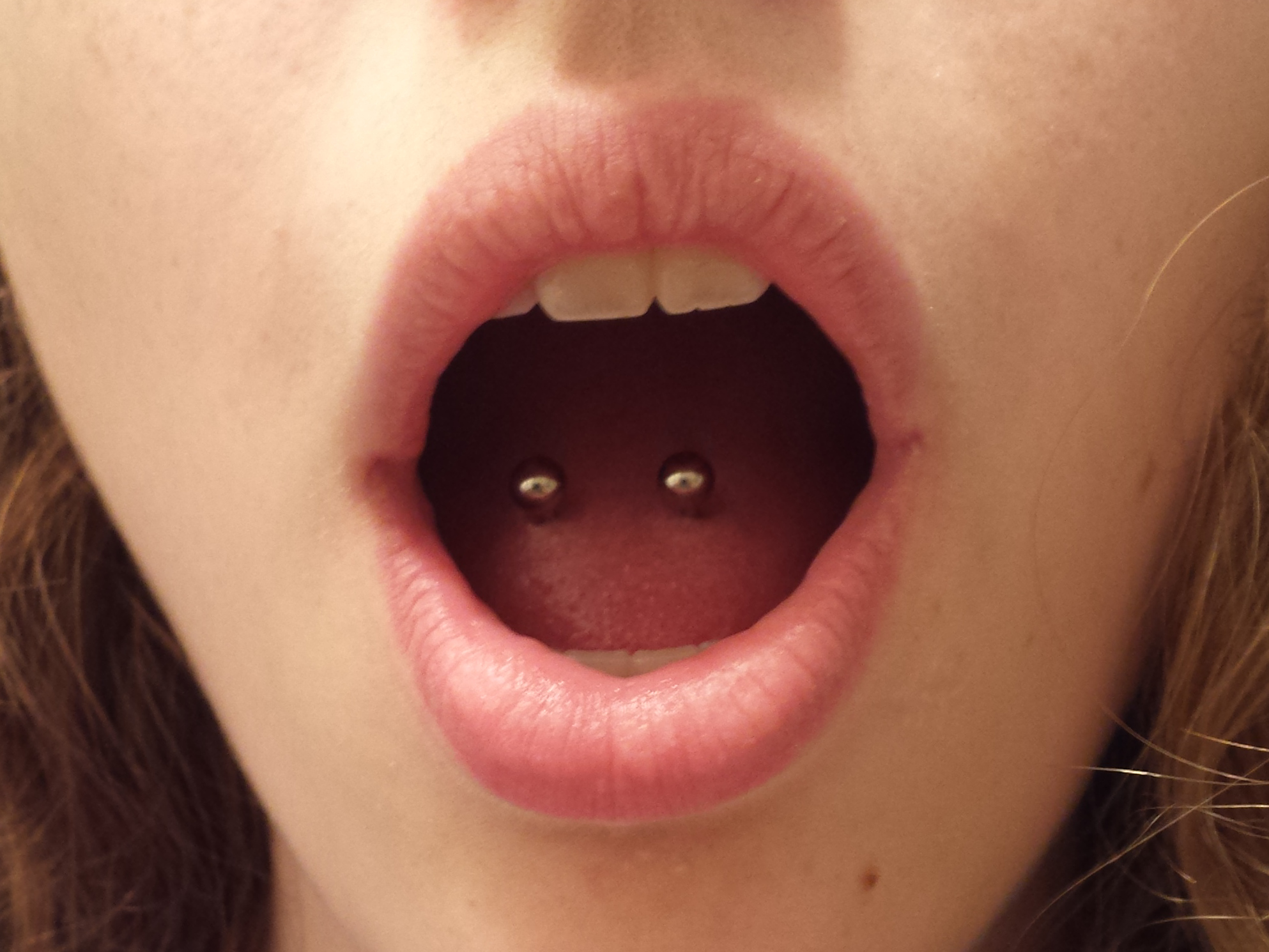
"Venom" piercings: two tongue piercings placed vertically.

The traditional placement for a tongue piercing is along the midline of the tongue, in the center of the mouth. It is often approximately .76 inches (1.9 cm) or so back from the tip of the tongue. It is placed with the top a little further back than the bottom, which allows the top of the jewelry to lean slightly back, away from the teeth, and toward the higher part of the upper palate where there is more room in the mouth. It is also usually positioned just in front of the attachment of the lingual frenulum.

A tongue frenulum piercing is a piercing through the frenulum underneath the tongue, known as the frenulum linguae, and commonly the tongue web piercing. "Venom bites" is the term given to two tongue piercings placed side by side on the tongue, which are considered to be more painful than a regular tongue piercing through the tongue's center. Although the term "angel bite" is sometimes referred to as two piercings in the tongue with one placed right in front of another, the term is much more common for two Monroe piercings on either side of the face. There is also the "snake-eyes" which is one curved bar going horizontally through the tip of the tongue, which is more painful as it goes through both "halves" of the tongue and not just the central connective tissue. It is possible to use a (stretched) tongue piercing as a first step to tongue splitting.

=== Risks ===
Documented complications of tongue piercings have included blood-borne infections causing brain and heart abscesses (with some deaths); hepatitis B and C, HIV, tuberculosis, and tetanus infections; swelling of the tongue causing airway obstruction, swallowing or choking on loose jewelry, damage to gums and broken teeth. Common complaints include pain, scars, excessive salivation and damage to tooth enamel.

Tongue piercings may cause speech impediments, such as a double tongue piercing restricting independent tongue mobility. There is also a risk of sensation loss.

=== Adverse effects ===
- Oral trauma, i.e. dental fracture and wear, affects 11–41% of subjects with tongue ornaments.
- Recession of gingival tissue affects 19–68% of subjects with tongue ornaments. The alveolar tooth-bearing bone may also be involved, jeopardizing the stability and durability of the teeth in place and requiring a periodontal regeneration surgery.
- Higher prevalence of colonization of Candida albicans was reported in young individuals with tongue piercing, in comparison to non-tongue-pierced matched individuals.

== See also ==
- Body piercing
- Lip piercing
- Tongue frenulum piercing
- Tongue splitting
