= Richard Simonton =

American businessman, entrepreneur and body piercer (1915–1979)

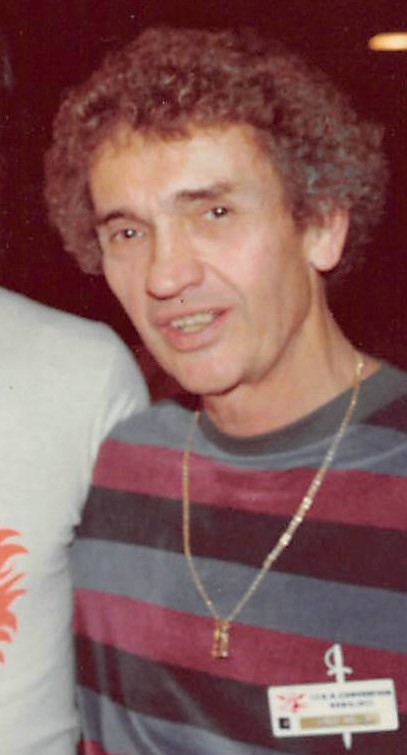
- Born: April 29, 1915; Evanston, Illinois
- Died: August 22, 1979 (aged 64)
- Other name: Doug Malloy

Richard Simonton (April 29, 1915 – August 22, 1979), also known under the pseudonym Doug Malloy, was a Hollywood businessman and entrepreneur, known for his involvement in the Hollywood community, his rescue of the steamboat Delta Queen, his work in preserving the work of musicians in the Welte-Mignon piano rolls and for founding the American Theatre Organ Society. Among piercing enthusiasts he is also known as a pioneer of the contemporary resurgence in body piercing.

== Early life and professional career ==
Richard Simonton was born in Evanston, Illinois, in 1915. His father died when he was three, and his mother subsequently moved to Seattle, where he grew up in the difficult conditions of the Great Depression. He showed an early aptitude for music and audio engineering, earning money in high school by tuning pipe organs. He later worked for the Masterphone Sound Company, which installed sound systems in silent theatres adapting to the new talking pictures. Always of an inventive and entrepreneurial mindset, before the age of twenty he had patented a circuit for electronic organs. In time he made his way to Southern California, where he was licensed as a professional engineer by the state and worked for Peerless Transformers and subsequently for RCA.

In 1939, Simonton went to New York to meet with the founders of the Muzak Corporation, which had been founded some five years before. He proposed that Muzak begin franchising, which it had not previously done, and ended up buying the franchise for the seven Western states, which he held until the 1970s. On the strength of this success, he began acquiring holdings in TV and radio stations, which included KRKD radio in Los Angeles and KULA radio and TV in Hawaii, the ABC affiliate.

He became a successful businessman and built an elaborate home in Toluca Lake, Los Angeles, where he lived until his death in 1979 at the age of 64. The house included two organs and a 63-seat home theatre, where he showed movies to large audiences every week for many years. Outgoing and sociable, Simonton was popular in the Hollywood community. Friends and visitors included people such as Groucho Marx, Laurence Olivier, and the composer Aram Khachaturian. His best friend for many years was the silent film star Harold Lloyd; He was a trustee of Lloyd's estate.

Simonton and his wife Helena had four children: Richard Jr., Robert, Mary, and Margaret. He was an involved family man, taking his family to live in Hawaii for some months and on other travels. They regularly spent summers on board the Delta Queen. The children convinced him to save the Delta Queen in 1958 when they learned that the boat was in financial distress and was not accepting reservations. Due to his children's demands, Simonton bought a controlling interest in the company and made it profitable. He also founded Pacific Network Inc. (PNI) and California Communications (CCI), firms that rented motion picture sound equipment to studios.

In the early 1970s, Simonton had an emergency operation for complications of appendicitis; the operation went wrong and he suffered brain damage. He spent several years struggling to regain full command of basic skills, including his speech. He largely retired from public life, although in time he was able to continue his love of travel and his wide community of friends. He died in 1979 from a heart problem, possibly related to the damage sustained in the operation.

== The American Theatre Organ Society ==
As a tremendous fan of theatre organ music, Simonton arranged a gathering at his home on February 8, 1955, where he and several other organ enthusiasts founded an association called the American Theatre Organ Enthusiasts, later shortened to the American Theatre Organ Society, which is still highly active. During the remainder of his life, he helped preserve and promote theatre organs and the music played upon them. His home contained two organs, a church-style Aeolian-Skinner pipe organ upstairs which was dedicated by Virgil Fox, and a Wurlitzer theatre organ downstairs in the theatre, which was equipped with professional recording equipment. Film showings at his home were often accompanied by live organ, played by some of the great theatre organists of the day, including Gaylord Carter, Jesse Crawford, Gordon Kibbee and Korla Pandit, all of whom performed and recorded at the house. Simonton also owned a third organ, the Wurlitzer pipe organ from the New York Paramount Theatre, which has been considered the greatest Wurlitzer pipe organ ever built. It had been the favored instrument of Jesse Crawford. Simonton acquired it with the idea of buying the Belmont Theatre in Los Angeles and installing the organ, but the deal for the theatre fell through and the organ was never set up in Los Angeles. It is now in the civic center in Wichita, Kansas. For a time Simonton also owned the Rogers touring organ. This was one of the touring organs used by Virgil Fox.

== The Delta Queen ==
In 1957, Simonton took his family for a river trip aboard the Delta Queen, a 285-foot steamboat then operating on the Mississippi and Ohio rivers. Built in the 1920s, the Delta Queen had begun as a California riverboat operating between San Francisco and Sacramento. After Simonton's cruise, the owners of the Delta Queen found they could not keep the business going. Simonton had so enjoyed his trip aboard the boat that he saved the enterprise, buying a controlling interest in 1957–58. With partners including E. J. Quinby, he turned the enterprise around, and even added an 1897 steam calliope rescued from the sunken Island Queen. For forty-two years, the boat ran on a series of Congressional exemptions from Safety at Sea laws. In 1966, Simonton sent his employee Bill Muster to Washington, DC to obtain the first exemption. Although the boat never went to sea, it would have been subject to Safety at Sea laws because it was built of wood from the water up. Bill Muster and company vice president Betty Blake led the effort to list the Delta Queen on the National Register of Historic Places in 1970. President Carter campaigned from the Delta Queen and was on board it in 1979 on the day Simonton died.

== The Welte-Mignon Piano Rolls ==
The Welte-Mignon Reproducing Piano was a sophisticated cousin of the player piano, a mechanical instrument that could reproduce the subtleties of master pianists' styles by means of paper rolls. Invented by Edwin Welte and his brother-in-law Karl Bockisch in Freiburg, Germany, in 1904, the system was applied to organs with the "Welte Philharmonic-Organ" in 1912. The rolls, recorded between 1904 and 1932, are now historically significant as part of the Welte-Mignon legacy and as unique witnesses to the playing styles of the prominent musicians who played for the originals. These include Mahler, Debussy, Fauré, Ravel, Scriabin, and others, playing their own compositions, a historically invaluable resource. (They are particularly interesting when they make mistakes playing their own works.) The Welte firm and its founders suffered heavily in World War II. After the war, Simonton wrote to Edwin Welte in an attempt to locate music rolls for his pipe organ. Welte answered that he had only managed to save about sixteen organ rolls, which he would exchange for food. He added that he and Bockisch had lost nearly everything in the war, but had managed to hide some of the piano rolls in a barn in the Black Forest. In 1948 Simonton travelled to Germany and went with Welte to the remains of the factory, which had been completely destroyed by bombing in 1944. Nothing remained standing; only the hidden master rolls in the Black Forest had survived. Simonton worked with Welte and Bockisch to rescue the legacy of the rolls. They played the rolls on Bockisch's Steinway-Welte piano and Simonton recorded the sound onto a tape recorder, an invention which was also extremely rare at the time. These tapes were released as LPs by Columbia Records in 1950. Welte and Bockisch selected and sold the best of the rolls to Simonton in 1948; some of the boxes arrived with straw from the barn still in them. He bought more from Bockisch's widow in 1952. Simonton remained in correspondence with Welte and Bockisch for many years, sending food parcels and other supplies, and Welte's daughter lived with the Simonton family for a time. After the initial purchase, Welte and Bockisch also found a Steinway-Welte piano for Simonton. Many of the rolls have since been re-recorded from that piano and issued on CD. Simonton ultimately donated the rolls to the music library at the University of Southern California.

== Body piercing innovator and promoter ==
Richard Simonton is best known in certain communities for his interest in alternative lifestyles. In 1932, he met and became inspired by Ernest Holmes, the author of The Science of Mind and founder of Religious Science, a metaphysical movement. Throughout his life Simonton was interested in similar topics, travelling to India and the Philippines to explore non-Western ideas. His interest in body piercing would also have been considered shocking at the time, and as he explored these interests later in life he adopted the name Doug Malloy to preserve his privacy. His family was largely sheltered from his involvement in the piercing movement and in aspects of the gay or bisexual lifestyle.

As Doug Malloy, he was an instrumental supporter and patron of the early body modification scene. By 1975, he had published a short, largely fictional autobiography entitled Diary of a Piercing Freak under his assumed name, which was sold to a fetish publisher and released in softback under the title The Art of Pierced Penises and Decorative Tattoos. He had also established contacts amongst body piercing enthusiasts both in Los Angeles and on a global scale, including London tattooist Alan Oversby (also known as Mr. Sebastian), Roland Loomis (also known as Fakir Musafar), Sailor Sid Diller, and Jim Ward. He and Ward started what they called the T&P Group—short for tattooing and piercing—an association of tattoo and piercing enthusiasts based primarily in Los Angeles. In 1977 Malloy visited the German tattooist and piercing pioneer Horst "Samy" Streckenbach in Frankfurt am Main. He documented this meeting by means of a tape recording, which has been preserved.

The upsurge in interest in body piercing had created enough interest that Simonton advised Jim Ward, who was working as a picture framer at the time, that he should start a body piercing business. In 1975, Simonton advanced Ward the money to start Gauntlet, originally a home based business, and Jim began to produce body piercing jewelry and learn how to pierce. This business began in November 1975, and it is considered the first of its type in the United States and was the beginning of the body piercing industry.

Simonton's experience as an amateur piercer formed the basis of the primitive techniques used at the time and his network of contacts was instrumental in spreading the popularity of body piercing. Ward perfected these techniques which have become industry standard the world over. In 1978, Gauntlet obtained a retail location. Doug also provided extensive notes that were ghostwritten by Ward into full articles for Piercing Fans International Quarterly (PFIQ), the first magazine devoted to the subject of body piercing, a Gauntlet publication.

One of Simonton's other notable contributions to the development of body piercing in contemporary society was his pamphlet Body & Genital Piercing in Brief , which is responsible for a large portion of the myths surrounding the origins of many piercings, most notably genital ones. Simonton's personal enthusiasm for body piercing as an erotic practice and his love of the fantastic came together in this document, which contains some fictional and/or speculative information. Many of the theories regarding the practice and origins of various piercings historically have been distorted by the widespread circulation of this document or later documents which quote it.
