= Frenulum piercing =

A frenulum piercing may refer to:

- Lip frenulum piercing, piercing through the frenulum of either the upper or lower lip
- Tongue frenulum piercing, piercing through the frenulum underneath the tongue
- Frenum piercing, or frenulum piercing, piercing of the penis shaft's underside
