= Maya society =

Social organization of the Pre-Hispanic Maya

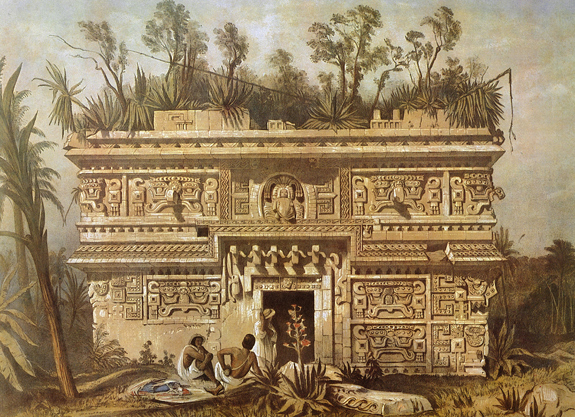
Las Monjas, 1843 painting of Chichén Itzá.

Maya society concerns the social organization of the Pre-Hispanic Maya, its political structures, and social classes. The Ancient Maya people were indigenous to Mexico and Central America and the most dominant people groups of Central America up until the 6th century.

In the Neolithic Age, Maya society has contributed to the fields of astronomy, mathematics, agriculture, art and writing. The Maya would peak as a civilization between 250 - 900 AD. This included complex cities, social life, and politics. Maya civilization began to decline after this time period, and remaining Maya would revert to more of a hunter-gatherer society. These remaining tribes would eventually be conquered by Europeans in the 1500s.

The Maya lived in Mesoamerica, concentrated in the Yucatán Peninsula, the Peten district of northern Guatemala and southern Mexico. The Maya reached the height of their civilization during the Classic Period of Maya civilization (A.D 250 to 900) before a decline starting about 900 AD. The Maya Civilization, centered in these tropical lands, reached their peak of power and influence around the sixth century.

The Maya practiced body modification, including cranium modification, dental modification, skin modification and piercings. The Maya valued individualism through body modification. Body modification sometimes reflected one's political status, a cultural belief that body modification may ward them from evil spirits, impersonating important cultural figures and to signify important events that have happened through one's life.

The Maya were known to engage in warfare to procure nearby resources, assert political control over neighbors, procure slave labor and sacrificial victims for rituals. Warfare in Maya society was frequent.

== Kingdom, court, and royalty ==
A Classic period Maya polity was a small kingdom (ajawil, ajawlel, ajawlil) headed by a hereditary ruler – ajaw, later kʼuhul ajaw. Both terms appear in early Colonial texts including Papeles de Paxbolón where they are used as synonyms for Aztec and Spanish terms for rulers and their domains. These are tlatoani and tlahtocayotl in Nahuatl, and the Spanish words rey, majestad, and reino and señor for ruler/leader/lord and señorío or dominio of realm. Such kingdoms were usually no more than a capital city with its neighborhood and several dependent towns (similar to a city-state). There were also larger polities that controlled larger territories and subjugated smaller polities; the extensive systems controlled by Tikal and Caracol serve as examples of these.

Each kingdom had its name that did not necessarily correspond to any locality within its territory. Its identity was that of a political unit associated with a particular ruling dynasty. For instance, the archaeological site of Naranjo was the capital of the kingdom of Saal. The land (chan chʼeʼn) of the kingdom and its capital were called Wakabʼnal or Maxam and were part of a larger geographical entity known as Huk Tsuk. Despite constant warfare and eventual shifts in regional power, most kingdoms never disappeared from the political landscape until the collapse of the whole system in the 9th century. In this respect, Classic Maya kingdoms were similar to late Postclassic polities encountered by the Spanish in Yucatán and Central Mexico: some polities were subordinate to hegemonic centers or rulers through conquest and/or dynastic unions and yet even then they persisted as distinct entities.

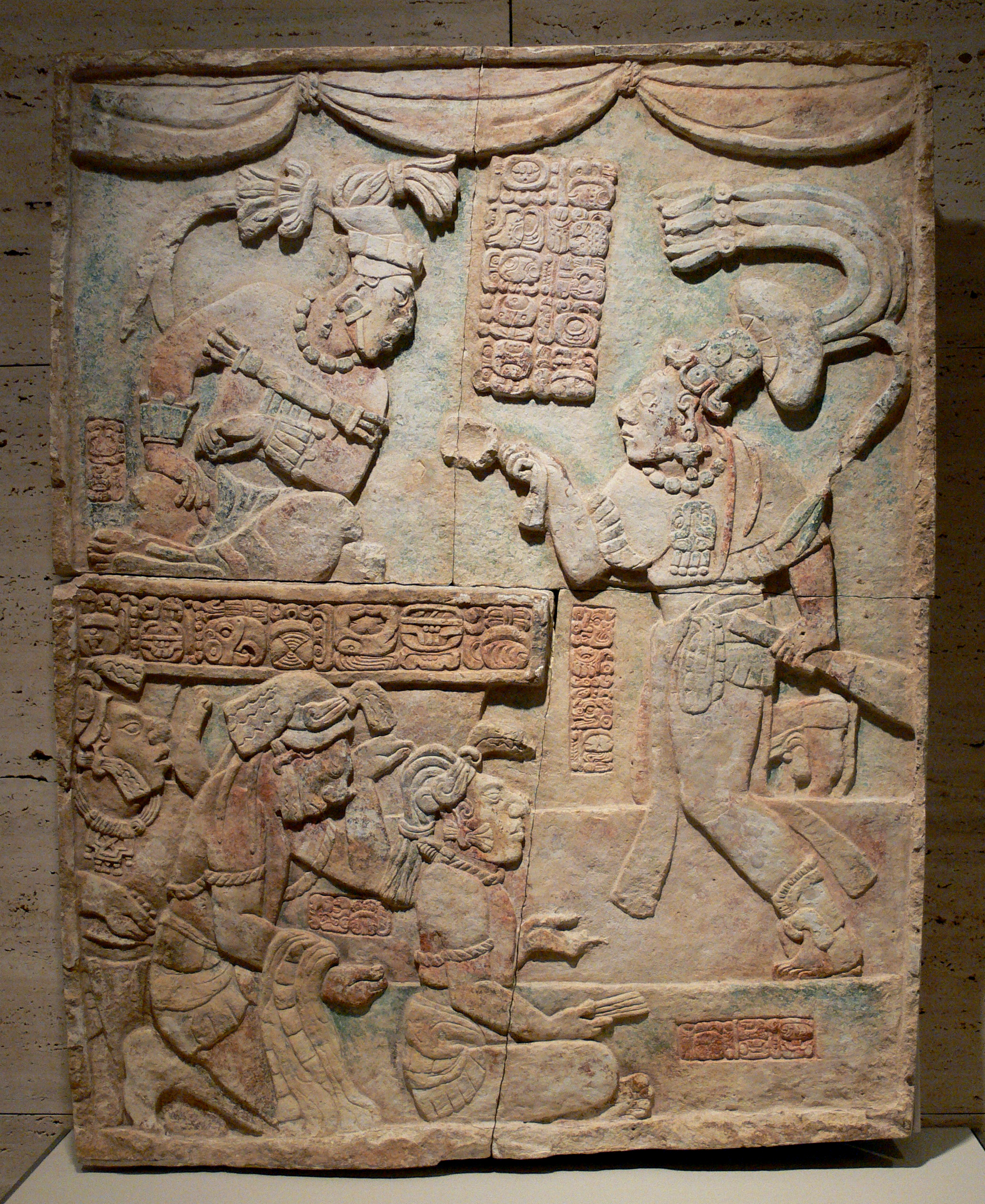
Presentation of captives to a Maya ruler

Mayanists have been increasingly accepting the "court paradigm" of Classic Maya societies that puts the emphasis on the centrality of the royal household and especially the person of the king. This approach focuses on the totality of Maya monumental spaces as the embodiment of the diverse activities of the royal household. It considers the role of places and spaces (including dwellings of royalty and nobles, throne rooms, temples, halls and plazas for public ceremonies) in establishing and negotiating power and social hierarchy, but also in producing and projecting aesthetic and moral values that define the order of a wider social realm. It focuses on the possessions and embodiment of which objects held in their society.

Spanish sources invariably describe even the largest Maya settlements of Yucatán and Guatemala as dispersed agglomerations of dwellings grouped around the temples and palaces of the ruling dynasty and lesser nobles. Though there was economic specialization among Classic period Maya centers (see Chunchucmil, for example), it was not conducted at a scale similar to that of the Aztec capital of Tenochtitlan. Some argue that Maya cities were not urban centers but were, instead, structured according to and conceptualized as enormous royal households, the locales of the administrative and ritual activities of the royal court. Within the theoretical framework of this model, they were the places where privileged nobles could approach the holy ruler, where aesthetical values of the high culture were formulated and disseminated, and where aesthetic items were consumed. They were the self-proclaimed centers and the sources of social, moral, and cosmic, order. The fall of a royal court as in the well-documented cases of Piedras Negras or Copán would cause the inevitable 'death' of the associated settlement.

The noble class was even more than complex and specialized in the climate of Maya society. Noble status and the occupation where only served and passed on through elite family lineages. Thus revealing that the Maya Civilization was set and it was very difficult to move upwards within the society. Occupations for Maya men was limited to their father's occupation. Thus, if your father was a farmer, then you were a farmer. The upper caste was composed of rulers, nobles and priests. The middle caste were businessmen, merchants and soldiers.

=== Kinship ===
Ancient Maya kinship and descent have alternatively been described as patrilineal, matrilineal, and bilateral. Maya political organization has been characterized as both segmentary (involving well-defined lineages and clan-like structures) and centralized.

=== Scribes ===
Scribes held a prominent position in Maya courts and had their own patron deities (see Howler monkey gods and Maya maize god). They often came from aristocratic families and likely were organized hierarchically. It appears that some scribes were attached to the royal house, while others were serving at temples and were, perhaps, counted among the priests. Maya art often depicts rulers with trappings indicating they were scribes or at least able to write, such as having pen bundles in their headdresses. Additionally, many rulers have been found in conjunction with writing tools such as shell or clay ink pots.

== Body modifications ==
To the ancient Maya, body modification was a reflection of a cultural, and individual, identity. Through different modifications, the body could be experienced individually, used as a symbol, or as a political statement. Beauty was also used to outwardly show and perform social and moral values.

Physical remains of the Maya help piece together the motivation and significance for enduring vast amounts of pain, and using great amounts of their wealth to make themselves beautiful. Ancient Maya placed a high value on certain extreme body modifications, often undergoing tedious and painful procedures as a rite of passage, an homage to their gods, and as a permanently visible status symbol of their place in society that would last a lifetime, and into their afterlife. Therefore, there was aesthetic, religious, and social reasoning behind the modification.

=== Cranium modification ===
The origin of cranial modification among the Maya is unknown, but it possibly was inherited from the Olmecs, predecessors of the Maya, who were located near the Tuxtla Mountains. Cranial modification was one of the most important practices of the Olmec culture. Individuals enduring cranial modification could be of any status, but many more elite individuals were depicted with cranial modifications. Intentional deformation practices were used as a way to differentiate between members of the society. All members of an elite family were expected to go through cranial modification, starting shortly after birth. The procedure occurred while the skull of the child was not fully grown and still soft, making it easily shaped.

==== Evidence ====
Most evidence of cranial deformation is found through osteological remains discovered through archaeological excavation of Maya sites. Through analysis of the different forms of the skulls, osteologists are able to differentiate between subtle differences in deformation styles to understand what these differences may mean. Interpretation of these different cranium types has been debated, but it is clear the shapes differed based on time and region. Spanish and other European records also provided detailed descriptions of cranium modification within their historical records. Some of the Spanish documentation included the different methods and materials used for cranium modification. Archaeological remains including artistic depictions or figurines exhibiting modified skull shape help to illuminate the importance of distinguishing one's self through the various types of modification.

==== Shapes ====
There are as many as 14 different cranial shapes caused by several different types of purposeful modification or deformation techniques used by members of the Maya society. Neonatal deformation was performed in two main ways: compression of the head with pads and adjusted bindings, or restraining the child on specially designed cradles. Often, a binding device was attached to the forehead so instead of growing naturally into a round or circular form, the child's cranium grew into a long, and tapered form which indented above the brow line. These different modifications resulted in an abundant amount of stress on the new child's body, and often led to death.

The two main head shapes of cranial modification for the Maya were erect deformation and oblique deformation. Erect deformation was modification through the use of cradle boards, which often left the occipital flattening asymmetrical, and affected a child's mobility. Oblique deformation was modification through the use of a paddle applied to the head and was sometimes in use with a frontal board and bandaging. This type of deformation did not cause problems with mobility. Practiced by all members of society, there were distinct differences of temporal and regional preferences.

During the Preclassic period, 2000 BCE – 250 CE, Maya skull modification imitated the head form of Olmec gods depicted throughout Olmec artwork. With the use of new and different techniques emerging in the Classic period, 250-900 CE, new cranial modification styles were endured, possibly as an indicator of membership within a kin group, or as a sign of a specific status. Additionally, in the Classic period, the general population used the erect deformation style of modification, while children expected to have high-status positions were given oblique deformation. Around 900 CE, the modification style standardized, and most human remains were found with tall skulls and flattened foreheads, the same modifications documented by the Spaniards when they arrived in Mesoamerica.

Regional differences in cranial modification styles were also evident. Within the Western Maya lowlands, the popular style of modification imitated the shape of the Maize God's head, and therefore, more people were discovered to have slanted skulls. Across the Guatemala highlands, erect deformation shapes were more likely to be used, and sometimes a band was placed vertically down the head to separate the head into two distinct sections. Cranial modification was able to draw lines between different ethnic groups, as well as represent social status/hierarchy within an individual culture.

==== Significance ====
Members of the community were expected to go through cranium modification as a part of a child's integration into the society. Maya men aspired to look like their ruler, Pakal, who was meant to represent incarnations of the deities. Pakal's body was shaped to resemble motifs and images of what the Sun and Maize gods were expected to look like. Evidence of the social hierarchy of the Maya was shown in pottery, figurines, drawings, monuments, and architecture picturing high-status elites with the oblique cranium modification. The oblique style cranuml modification, the style endured by Pakal, may have also meant to shape the head like a jaguar, a figure extremely important to Maya religion, sacred to their culture, and a status of power. Additionally, Maya women standards of beauty were also based on the Maize God. Overall, cranial modifications are significant because of their relation with deities and power symbols of the Maya and the outwardly performative aspect displaying specific characteristics of a member within the Maya culture and society.

==== Motivation ====
Due to a lack of written records on the reasons or motivation for cranial modification, the reason the head was the center of this modification is still not clear. One reason is possibly the need for children to be protected when they are born. The Maya believed when children were born, they were vulnerable and thus needed to be protected from soul loss and evil winds. The soul was encased within the head, and therefore these newly souled infants needed to be guarded; cranium modification was one of the ways to protect the soul from being snatched from the newborn. The head was understood to be a portal into a person's true essence or essential entity, which could be harmed, stolen, or manipulated. Performing cranial modification as soon as the child was born ensured the soul, or essence, of the child was fully protected.

Additionally, hair was seen as a way to preserve the essence of the soul, tonalli, from leaving the head of the body. Cutting the hair of a boy too soon was thought to diminish that individual's knowledge and reason. Lastly, Tzompantli, or skull racks, were associated with passage to the celestial world, and the heads on the rack were believed to contain the essence of the individual spirits. Therefore, by killing an enemy and removing their skulls from their bodies, the essence of the individual was violated.

=== Dental modification ===
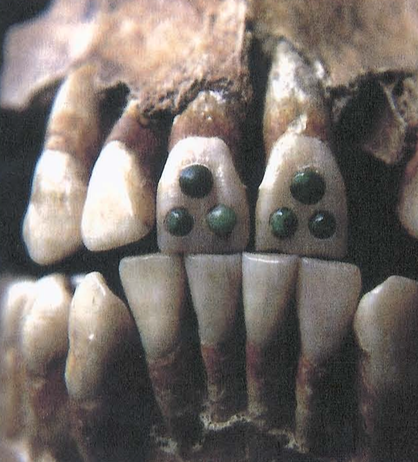
An example of inlay dental modification

Dental modification may have been a way to identify with a lineage, polity, ruler, or region. The modification of teeth was dependent on social status, as well as location.

The Maya practiced two different types of tooth modification, filing and inlay. Filing was altering the tooth shape to create notches, grooves, or points. This type of dental modification appeared during the Early Preclassic period (1400-1000 BCE) and was completed with stone abraders and water. Inlay was drilling holes to insert different materials, and was popular throughout the Middle Preclassic period (900-600 BCE). In the remainder of the time periods the two were used simultaneously, but filing was much more common overall.

Most likely teeth were modified as a part of ritual or for aesthetic purposes, and younger children usually did not have modified teeth. Once their permanent teeth had arrived, adolescent warriors had their teeth filed to sharp points to give them a fierce appearance, and as a further mark of status.^{[4]}High-status women often had their teeth filed, in different patterns, and would have jadeite, hematite, pyrite, turquoise, or other decorations inset into holes drilled in their teeth.^{[4]} Depending on the material, the meaning of the inlay varied. For example, jade symbolized pure breath or the ability to express elegant speech.

==== Evidence ====
Overall, little evidence for the relationship between socioeconomic status and types of dental modification exists. Most evidence comes from documentation of Europeans in the 16th century who viewed the processes of dental modification. However, these accounts can be problematic as they are filled with bias, and much of the process may be recorded incorrectly, or emphasized in a way to villainize the Maya. More concrete evidence is found through archaeological of ceramics or iconography, and osteological remains of Maya people themselves. Iconographic or images of dental modification, including filling and inlay, are pictured on ceramics or within paintings found at Maya or other Mesoamerican sites. Additionally, teeth of Maya individuals have been excavated from Maya sites and analyzed by dendrologists and other dental specialists recognized dental disease associated with excess filling or drilling of the teeth. This means dental modification was occurring on living subjects. Dental diseases found on the remains of the teeth of Maya individuals shows evidence for excessive dental modifications. Additionally, some of the dental remains were inlaid with various stones, and were filed in a variety of ways.

==== Significance ====
Modification of the teeth was important as different teeth styles exhibited certain characteristics and motifs important to Maya religion, and social status. “Modified dentition conveyed ideas about wealth, threat, and the nature of speech.” Incisors were filed in “T” shape to represent “wind” motifs, as wind was especially important to the Maya embodying the “life force” and a way to honor the maize god. Pakal, the Maya King, had his teeth filed in the shape of a “T” as a way to change the structure of his facial features to make it look as though he were squinting, a direct reflection of the maize god. Teeth were an advertisement of status and as it was an abundant amount of pain, it was likely a rite of passage into adulthood, signifying the ability to tolerate pain. Overall, dental modification was meant to show a specific kind of status, despite being endured by both men and women of various classes. Enduring this type of pain exhibited traits about the overall character of an individual, and congratulated members for reaching a milestone of life.

=== Skin modification ===
Body paint, tattoos, and scarification were all used in different ways by the Maya to signify important events in one's life, as well as to symbolize differing class distinctions. As evidence of skin modification from human remains can not be studied, the evidence for tattooing, scarification, and body paint among the Maya comes from iconographic images such as pottery and murals, artifacts such as tools and vessels used for storing pigment, as well as ethnohistoric accounts.

==== Body paint ====
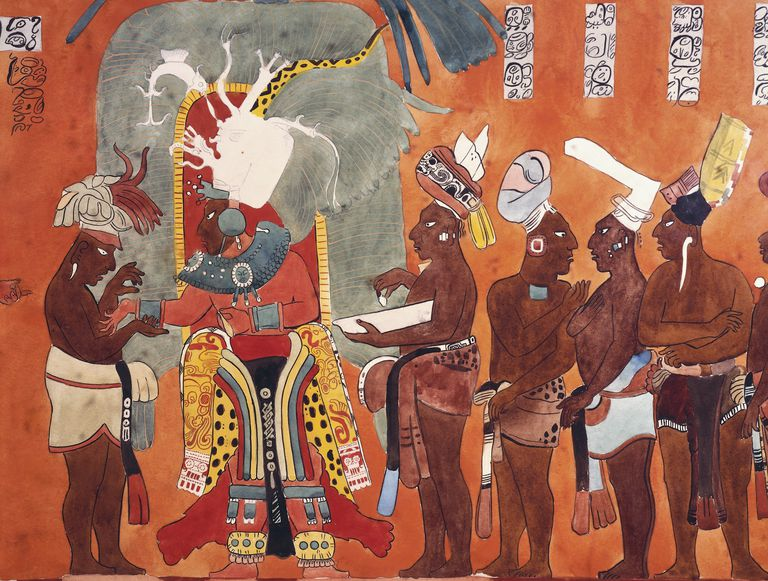
Mural from Bonampak of elite man being painted red

Body paint patterns were incredibly localized and color and design varied according to location. Two of the most widely used colors among the Maya were red, which was made of cinnabar or vermilion, with hematite and iron ore added. Another popular culture, and one that was possibly the most valued among the Maya was a blue or green pigment made with indigo and a mineral called Palygorskite. This blue/green color was highly valued because it was associated not only with jade, but with sacrifice to the gods as well. Spanish explorer Diego de Landa states in one of his accounts:

"...they had the custom of painting their faces and bodies red... they thought it very pleasing...the victim....having smeared him with blue... they brought him up to the round alter..."

The evidence for body painting among the Maya largely comes from various murals. One mural found in Bonampak, Chiapa shows a man being painted red from the neck down by a servant while a woman's face is painted red. Another mural found at Calakmul depicts merchants and non-elites wearing face paint of various colors and designs, suggesting that paint may have been used to differentiate class and gender.

==== Tattoos and scarification ====
While there is a physical difference between scarification and tattoos, the Maya may not have differentiated between the two practices. Tattoos and scarification were used to mark significant events in Maya life. Diego de Landa says: "A thief from the highest class is punished by having his face tattooed on both sides from the beard to the forehead. … the young men do not tattoo except to a slight degree until marriage."

Scholar Cara Tremain argues that some tattoos and scars may have been associated with the elite, as "killing" and "rebirth" of the skin through cutting creates an association with death and the rebirth of deities. Tremain also argues that some types of tattooing and scarification symbolized valor and bravery. This theory is supported by the accounts of Diego de Landa who said, "They tattooed their bodies, and the more they do this, the more brave and valiant are they considered, as tattooing is accompanied with great suffering, and is done in this way. Those who do the work first painted the part which they wish with color and afterwards they delicately cut in the paintings, and so with the blood and coloring matter the marks remained in the body. This work is done a little at a time on account of the extreme pain, an afterwards also they were quite sick with it, since the designs festered and matter formed. In spite of all this they made fun of those who were not tattooed."

=== Piercings ===
The practice of piercing one's ears, lips, nose, or cheeks was shared by all Maya, but it was the type of jewelry worn that was used to differentiate social status. Children would be pierced at a young age as well, with ear flares and spools getting increasingly bigger as the child aged, stretching the ear. The majority of evidence for Maya piercings comes from archaeological remains of jewelry found in tombs, such as labrets and ear spools. Ethnohistorical accounts also provide us evidence for the amount and high quality of the piercings the Maya wore. In an account of his travels the Spanish Bishop Diego Lopez de Cogolludiois stated: "The holes in the noses and ears [were filled with] nose and ear pieces of cuzas and other stones of varied colors."

=== Visual modification ===
In Relación de las cosas de Yucatán, Diego de Landa reports that Maya mothers would artificially induce cross-eyedness in infants. Cross-eyedness was seen as a valued characteristic and it has been suggested that the Maya deity Kinich Ahau was depicted as cross-eyed as well.

== Warfare ==
The Mayas employed warfare in each period of their development for the purposes of obtaining sacrificial victims, settling competitive rivalries, acquiring critical resources and gaining control of trade routes. Warfare was important to the Maya religion, because raids on surrounding areas provided the victims required for, as well as slaves for the construction of temples. Large-scale battles were also fought to determine and defend territories as well as secure economic power. The Mayas defended their cities with defensive structures such as palisades, gateways, and earthworks. Some cities had a wall within the outer wall, so advancing enemies would be trapped in a killing alley, where they could be slaughtered in great number. During the post-Classic period, the amount of internal warfare increased greatly as the region became more politically fragmented. Armies were enlarged, and in some cases mercenaries were hired. The resulting destruction of many urban centers contributed to the decline of the Maya.

=== Military organization ===
The ruler of a Maya city was the supreme war captain. Some only dictated military activity, while others participated in the battle. There was a core of warriors that served year-round as guards and obtained sacrificial victims, but most large Maya cities and religious centers had militias. These men were paid to fight for the duration of the battle. Then they would return to their fields or crafts. The militia units were headed by nacoms, hereditary war chiefs, that employed ritual as well as strategic methods in warfare. Some nacoms were only chief strategists, and the troops were led into battle by batabs, or officers. In a large war, even commoners who did not have weapons would fight using hunting tools and by hurling rocks. “In the highlands, women occasionally fought in battles according to native chronicles” (Foster, 144).

=== Tactics ===
The jungle terrain of Mesoamerica made it difficult for large armies to reach their destination. The warriors who were familiar with the battle landscape could strategically retreat into familiar wilderness. Other war tactics included the siege of cities and the formation of alliances with lesser enemies to defeat more prominent ones. There is evidence that canoes were used to attack cities, located on lakes and rivers. In the late Classic period, destructive warfare methods, such as burning, became more prevalent.

=== Rituals ===
Warfare was a ritual process, which was believed to be sanctioned by the gods. Military leaders, in many instances, also had religious authority. Before going into battle, the armies would call upon the gods with dances and music of drums, whistles, conch shell horns and singing. The drumming and war cries would signify the start of the battle. The armies also carried religious idols into battle to inspire the warriors. They fought fiercely because they believed that death on the battle field secured them eternal bliss, whereas capture by the enemy was regarded as worse than any death When an enemy was defeated, the victorious army exploited the religious icons and sometimes humiliated the defeated leader with prolonged captivity. The treatment of prisoners by the victorious was brutal and often ended in decapitation. The Maya also had a ritual of giving blood as a religious offering. They took the blood from their genitals and tongue then, afterwards, they would drip their blood onto a piece of paper and burn it into the sky to show respect to their gods.

=== Weapons and uniform ===
Weapons used by the Maya included spear-throwers known as atlatls, blowguns, obsidian spiked clubs, spears, axes, lances and knives tipped with flint or obsidian blades. Bow and arrows were also used, but not as extensively. Though there were few helmets, they used decorated shields made from woven mats, wood and animal skins for protection. The Maya war leaders dressed to inspire their warriors and terrify their enemies. They usually wore padded cotton armor, a mantle with religious insignia, and elaborate wooden and cloth headdresses, that represented the animal spirit or “way” of the warrior. Metal was not used in battle because of the limited supply.

== See also ==
- Aztec body modification
