= Alan Oversby =

British body piercer

- Born: 20 February 1933
- Died: 8 May 1996 (aged 63)
- Other names: Mr. Sebastian
- Occupations: body piercer, tattoo artist, art teacher
- Known for: a primary developer of contemporary body piercing

Alan Oversby (20 February 1933 – 8 May 1996) was one of the primary figures in the development of contemporary body piercing in Europe. He was better known by his professional name Mr. Sebastian.

== Career ==
Originally an art teacher, Alan Oversby left his initial profession to pursue his interests in tattooing and piercing instead. From his studio in London, he promoted both tattooing and body piercing, especially within the gay leather community. He was a correspondent of both Doug Malloy and Jim Ward. Sponsored by Malloy, he visited Los Angeles. Malloy also sponsored trips to London to visit him, bringing along Ward and Sailor Sid Diller. These exchanges were critical to the global spread of the techniques and technology used in contemporary body piercing.

Oversby was also responsible for the adoption of the use of topical and local anesthetics as part of piercing procedure in Europe. Although they are used less now, it used to be standard practice to use anaesthetics when performing piercings in England, whereas in North America this practice is almost unknown.

He was interviewed in the fourth issue of PFIQ. He performed much of the tattooing and piercing on Psychic TV musicians Genesis P-Orridge and Paula P-Orridge. His vocals were used in the Psychic TV track "Message from The Temple" which appeared on their first album Force the Hand of Chance.

== Operation Spanner ==
In 1987 Oversby was one of 16 men charged as a part of Operation Spanner, a series of raids that resulted in the arrest of men who were all engaged in consensual homosexual BDSM activities.

Oversby's case was eventually separated from the Spanner investigation. This was because there was no connection between him and the other men who were charged. (Except in a professional capacity.)

Oversby, like the other men, was charged with assault occasioning actual bodily harm for performing a genital piercing on a client. He was also charged with using anaesthetic without a licence and for sending obscene material through the post (photographs of piercings).

As the judge was not willing to take the consensuality of the participants into account, Oversby pleaded guilty. He received a sentence of 15 years, which was suspended to two years.
