= Body jewelry materials =

Materials used in body piercing

Body jewelry materials used in body piercing vary according to whether they are suitable for initial piercings, fully healed piercings, or both. They can be biocompatible metals and alloys such as steel, titanium, niobium, bronze, silver, or gold; non-metallic manufactured substances such as porcelain, glass, polymers, teflon, or acrylic; or organic materials such as gemstones, wood, amber, and animal products such as bone, horn, or ivory.

The Association of Professional Piercers (APP), a California-based international non-profit organization, provides guidelines as to which materials can be used for initial or fully healed piercings. In particular, jewelry used for initial piercings must, firstly, be inert and compatible with the body so it does not cause irritation, allergy, or infection, and secondly, able to withstand the heat and pressure of autoclave sterilization.

== Metals and metal alloys ==
For initial piercings, the APP recommends the use of metals or metal alloy materials that meet the American Society for Testing and Materials (ASTM) or International Organization for Standardization (ISO) standards for metal materials used in medical devices and surgical implants. These include surgical stainless steel and other Steel alloys, and titanium (Ti).

Without recommending them, the APP also acknowledges that other metals or metal alloys not covered by appropriate ASTM or ISO standards can be used for initial piercings. These include niobium (Nb), bronze (an alloy), silver (Ag), and gold (Au).

=== Surgical stainless steel ===
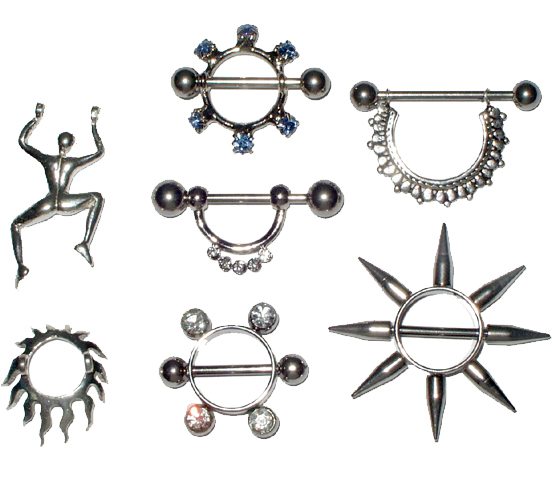
Stainless steel nipple jewelry

"Surgical stainless steel" is used to denote several grades of stainless steel used in biomedical applications, but because the term lacks a formal regulatory definition manufacturers often use it to describe any corrosion-resistant steel. However the APP notes that: "Many of them [surgical stainless steels] are used for body jewelry, but only a few specific grades are proven biocompatible", namely those compliant with ASTM F138, ISO 5832-1, ISO 10993-6, ISO 10993–10, and ISO 10993-11. The most common varieties of steel classified as surgical stainless steel are austenitic 316 and martensitic 420 and 440 stainless steels.

SAE 316 stainless steel, also referred to as marine grade stainless steel, is a chromium, nickel, and molybdenum steel alloy noted for its strength and corrosion resistance. It is ASTM F138-compliant and its SAE 316L and SAE 316LVM grades are used for body jewelry, with the "L" indicating they are low-carbon varieties, usually containing 0.3% carbon or less. (SAE 316L stainless steel is designated UNS S31603 under the Unified Numbering System, and SAE316LVM is designated UNS S31673.) SAE 316L stainless steel typically contains 16-18% chromium, 10-14% nickel, and 2-3% molybdenum, with an upper limit of 0.3% carbon. SAE 316LVM stainless steel typically contains 17-19% chromium, 13-15% nickel, and 2.25–3% molybdenum, also with an upper limit of 0.3% carbon. The "VM" in SAE 316LVM stands for "vacuum melting," a vacuum induction melting process that prevents contamination from the air and removes existing gases already dissolved in the metal. However, SAE 316L can demonstrate lower corrosion resistance compared to SAE 317LMN, and SAE 316LVM exhibits lower corrosion resistance compared with other metallic materials such as titanium-based alloys.

SAE 420 and SAE 440 stainless steel varieties, also known as cutlery stainless steel, are high-carbon steels alloyed with carbon, chromium, silicon, manganese, phosphorus, and sulfur. Some SAE 440 samples may contain trace amounts of nickel of less than 0.06%, but these two steels typically contain no nickel. Being martensitic stainless steel grades, their corrosion resistance is inferior to SAE 316 stainless steel materials.

Steel body jewelry has both advantages and disadvantages. Certain varieties are biocompatible and can be sterilized in autoclaves. However, steel's high thermal conductivity compared to organic materials such as wood or horn can also cause it to feel colder against the skin in low temperatures. Because of its weight, larger pieces of steel jewelry can cause tension in the body tissue or unwanted stretching or tearing of a piercing, potentially dangerous in areas with low blood circulation such as the earlobe. Various grades of stainless steel, including some ASTM F138-compliant varieties, contain some nickel, leading to individuals with a nickel allergy sometimes experiencing allergic reactions to steel jewelry, depending on their sensitivity and the jewelry's nickel content. As a form of contact dermatitis, nickel allergy symptoms can include a painful, itchy rash on the skin where it has come in contact with the jewelry as well as redness, hives, dryness, discoloration, blisters, and draining fluid. Skin may also become excoriated or broken, especially if the person scratches affected areas. Consequently, the APP recommends that only steel alloys that are confirmed as European Union (EU) Nickel Directive compliant be used for body jewelry.

=== Titanium ===
High nickel-bearing alloys were restricted from use in new body jewelry piercings after the EU Nickel Directive came into force, and so, because of their virtually nickel-free content, titanium alloys became the preferred materials within the borders of the EU. The APP recommends that titanium and titanium alloys certified to meet ASTM or ISO standards for surgical implant applications can be used for body jewelry. This includes the implant-certified titanium/ aluminum/vanadium alloy Ti-6Al-4V ELI, which complies with ASTM F136, ASTM F1295, and ISO 5832-3, as well as "commercially pure" titanium that complies with ASTM F67 and is manufactured in Grades 1 to 4, Grade 5 Ti-6Al-4V alloy, or Grade 23 Ti-6Al-4V ELI alloy.

Pure and alloyed titanium body jewelry is lightweight at around 60% of the weight of stainless steel, is highly corrosion resistant, is less likely to react with body fluids, is not magnetic, can be sterilized in an autoclave, and can be anodized to create a layer of colored oxide on the surface, with common colors including yellow, blue, purple, green, and rainbow. Very few long-term allergies or other complications have been reported, although as with any material they could arise after prolonged contact with the human body.

=== Niobium ===
Niobium (Nb) is a silvery metal found in pyroclore that is corrosion-resistant due to an oxide layer present on its surface. Pure niobium is inert and does not react to body fluids or the oxidizing agent aqua regia. Because of its biocompatibility, corrosion resistance, and mechanical properties it is used as an alloying metal in titanium medical implants, but it does not have an implant-grade classification itself.

Since niobium oxidizes very slowly in the Earth's atmosphere it can be used as a hypoallergenic alternative to nickel in jewelry. It can also be anodized in a wide range of colors, including black, and meets the APP's guidelines for use in both initial and healed piercings due to its ability to be safely sterilized in an autoclave and for being "compatible with the body so it doesn't cause irritation, allergy, or infection".

=== Bronze ===
Bronze is an alloy of different metals but the most common blend in body jewelry is 90% copper to 10% tin, with it often being used in larger piercings such as ear weights. Some bronzes contain arsenic which can "bleed" into the body, and bronze can also discolor the skin with a greenish color. This can be removed unless it gets into open wounds, where it can permanently discolor the tissue.

=== Silver ===
Silver (Ag) is a noble metal and has been common in all forms of jewelry for centuries due to its lustre and ability to be treated so as to generate contrasting black sections.

=== Gold ===
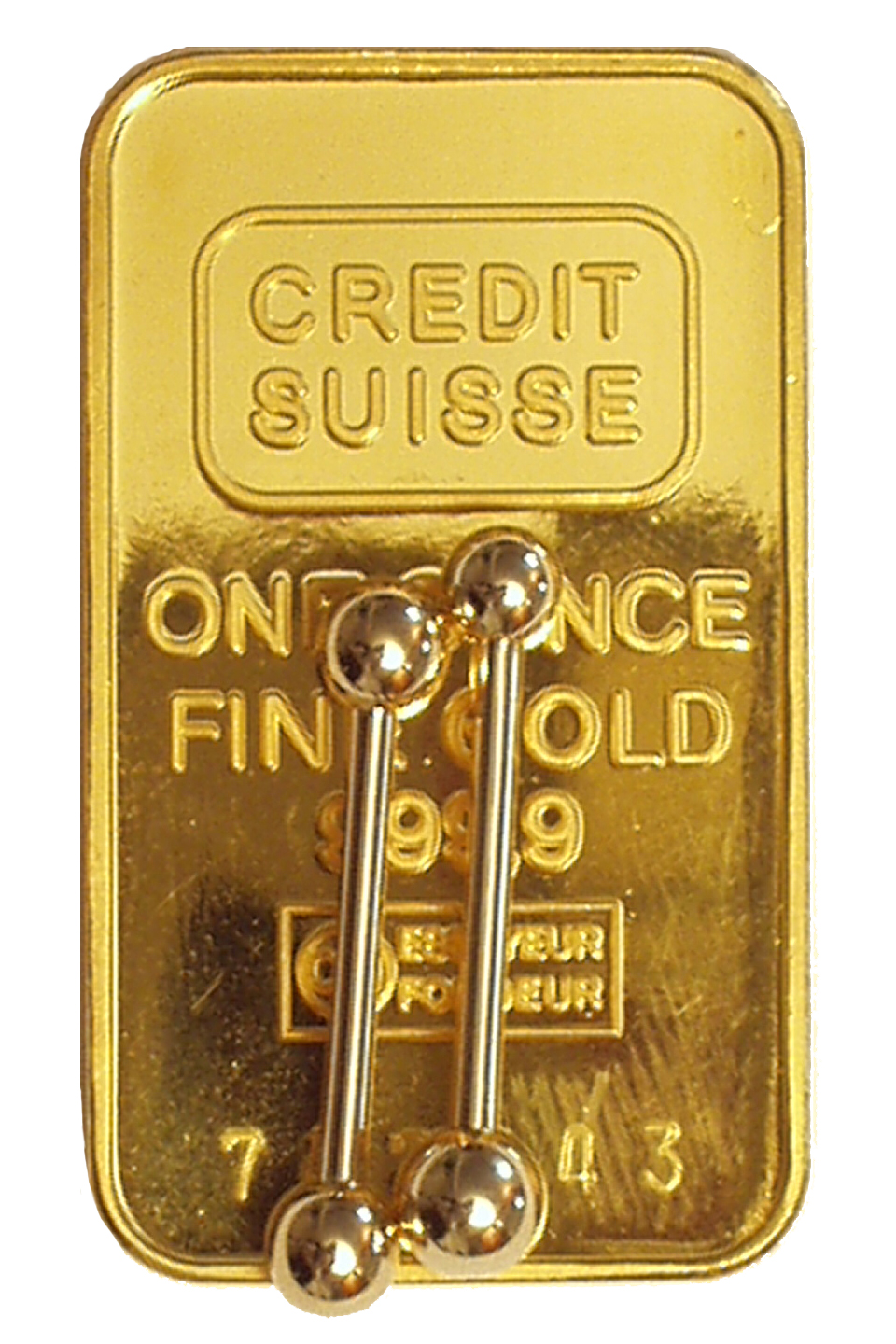
14K gold barbells in front of 24K gold for color comparison

Gold (Au) is also a noble metal with a long tradition of use in jewelry. Its purity is measured in karats (k), with 24 karat gold being entirely pure gold and much softer than gold alloys. Piercing jewelry is often made of a gold alloy with the most common being 18k gold, which usually contains 75% gold with the remaining 25% made up of copper, silver, and traces of other metals. In lower quality gold, zinc, nickel, and other irritants can also be found.

While not recommending specific ASTM or ISO standards for gold, the APP states that it can be used in body jewelry for initial piercings provided that it is palladium-based and nickel free, and with the caveat that a lower purity than 14k or 18k (58 to 75%) is not recommended. The APP also approves of the use of yellow, rose, or white gold in body jewelry, provided it is "14k or higher, nickel- and cadmium-free, and alloyed for biocompatibility."

Allergy to gold is uncommon but it does exist, mostly from white gold. In some extreme cases the copper in the jewelry can tarnish and cause greenish discoloring of tissue. Gold can also become discolored following autoclaving, possibly due to reacting with residues left from polishing or cleaning products. Because pure gold is a soft metal it is susceptible to surface abrasions which may harbor bacteria or cause physical irritation in healing piercings, and this softness leads to it being generally discouraged for oral jewelry due to the risk of deformation from occlusal forces.

== Non-metallic materials ==
=== Porcelain ===
Porcelain is high-temperature-fired stoneware, and if the glaze is non-porous and free of toxic elements such as lead and cadmium it may be suitable for healed piercings.

=== Glass ===
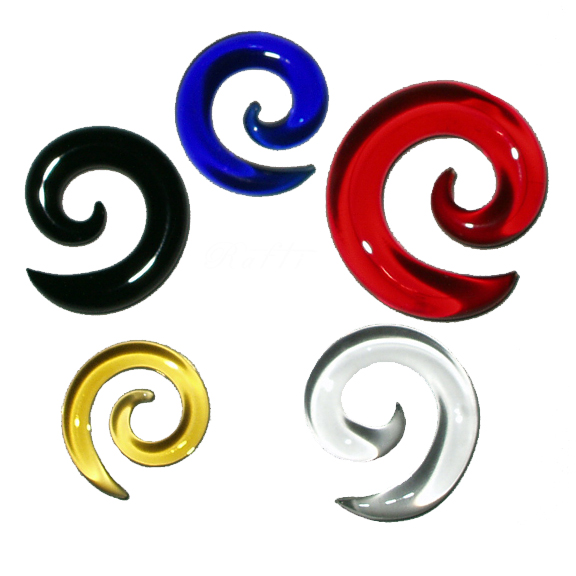
Ear Spirals made out of glass

Glass is a common piercing material which has been used for thousands of years, as evidenced by ear plug jewelry made of glass having been found in ancient Egyptian tombs. If correctly shaped and manufactured, glass can be used for body jewelry, being comfortable to wear, tough, safe for the body, and able to be sterilized in an autoclave.

The APP recommends several types of glass for use in initial piercings, including fused quartz, lead-free borosilicate, or lead-free soda-lime glass.

=== Polymers ===
Polymers (plastics) have been used for both implants and piercings, and early users often used them as healing jewelry for new piercings, although there are now better and safer ways of doing this. The APP recommends three types of biocompatible polymers for use in new piercings: Tygon Medical Surgical Tubing S-50HL; Tygon Medical Surgical Tubing S-54HL; and Bioplast. The APP also recommends checking that polymer body jewelry products other than these are United States Pharmacopeia (USP) VI compliant before using in new piercings.

Polymers can be lightweight, have resistance to the body's chemical reactions, and can be safe regarding allergies. However, many polymers are absorbent and have a porous surface, making it necessary to take the jewelry out often to thoroughly clean or replace it so as to avoid infection or sensitization from residues.

=== Teflon ===
Teflon (polytetrafluoroethylene or PTFE) was invented in 1938 and can be refined for medical use to make it biocompatible where there is a need for prolonged contact with skin. It is lightweight, bendable, can be autoclavedable, is not visible with X-rays, is not magnetic, and is very stable. As such, Teflon is suited for implants and piercings, especially if some flexibility of the material is desired, and is commonly used as a retainer.

=== Acrylic (PMMA) ===
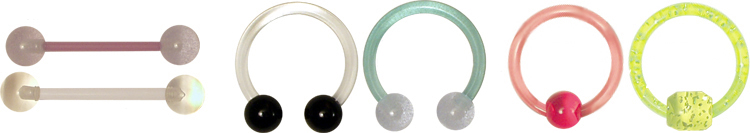
Acrylic plastic body piercing jewelry

PMMA (poly methyl methacrylate) is a transparent plastic mostly used for plugs and tapers in piercings. It is also known as acrylic or acrylic glass, and goes by the trade names of Plexiglas and Perspex, among others.

Due to acrylic's smoothness it has been used for stretching, although the use of acrylic tapers for rapid stretching can cause tissue trauma. Acrylic is unsuitable for new or irritated piercings because it cannot be steam sterilized and may degrade at temperatures well below normal body temperature. It is also fragile and can easily crack, craze, or shard if dropped, with a tendency to collect body fluids and skin parts in tiny pores and fissures. Acrylic can also be a chemical irritant or allergen, resulting in acrylic monomer dermatitis from the decomposition of methyl methacrylate.

== Natural Materials ==
=== Gemstones ===
Gemstones are typically considered biocompatible for use in body jewelry provided the stones are free of toxic inclusions and the surfaces are polished to eliminate sharp edges. They are mostly used as inlays in plugs or as beads in ball closure rings (BCRs).

Most gemstones can be autoclaved, but some, such as opals, cannot stand the heat and should be cleaned some other way. Quality varies widely with different gems and it can be hard to find stones big enough for body jewelry without cracks and scratches. Some stones may affect the body: for example, malachite contains copper that can discolor the skin, and other gemstones may contain lead (e.g. glass), arsenic, or other hazardous materials.

=== Wood ===
Wood is a common material for plugs and other shapes, and is also an excellent base for more advanced jewelry since the flat faces of a wooden plug can be inlaid with gemstones or metals. Wood can be easily shaped, although hardwood is preferable since if correctly treated it doesn't swell, is stable and durable, does not absorb a lot of moisture or body fluids, and the surface can be polished to be very smooth. Wooden jewelry also possesses low thermal conductivity which provides insulation in cold climates, and due to its porosity wood can absorb skin oils and sebum, which may reduce the odors associated with dead skin cell accumulation in healed piercings.

Some types of wood are strongly discouraged for piercing jewelry as they can cause allergic reactions or otherwise be irritating for the skin. If wooden body jewelry is not cared for properly it may dry out and lose lustre, and being autoclaved can cause cracking, warping, or splitting. The porosity of wood and its inability to be safely sterilized make it inappropriate as a material for initial piercings or unhealed stretches.

=== Amber ===
Amber is fossilized tree sap and is commonly used for inlays in metal jewelry or in plugs made of horn, bone, or wood. Its most common color is a golden yellow, although it also comes in black, greenish, reddish, white, brown, blue, and various blends. Pieces of amber sometimes contain well-preserved insects, plants, and small animals.

Amber has a smooth surface that is kind to the skin, but tends to be a little fragile and cannot be autoclaved.

=== Animal products ===
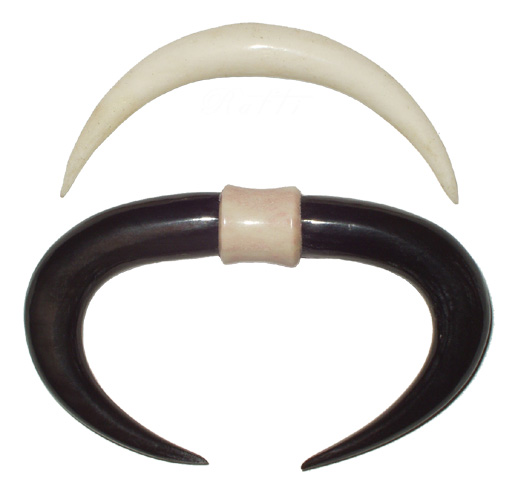
Hand carved tusks made out of horn, these are normally worn in nasal septum piercings.

Animal products such as bone, horn, and ivory are quite common in body jewelry and have been used by many cultures. Like wood, they are easily shaped and may be finished to an acceptably smooth surface. They also get less cold than other hard solid materials due to their insulating properties, but like wood they can dry and crack.

Lower quality jewelry made from bone, horn, or ivory may have scratches or cracks which can harbor bacteria, or poor finishes which can result in harsh textures. Badly cleaned materials can transfer remaining bacteria to the wearer. Bone, horn, and ivory cannot be autoclaved, as it will destroy them, making them unsuitable for unhealed piercings or for stretching existing ones.

Fossilized mammoth, mastodon, and walrus ivory are mineralized materials most commonly found in Siberia or Alaska. Mammoth ivory can be found in more than the normal white or yellowish colors of normal ivory because minerals in the ground sometimes color it. Unless it is properly cared for, mammoth ivory is prone to cracking caused by changes in temperature and moisture levels. Large amounts of mammoth ivory are exposed in the permafrost of Siberia every year, and this abundance and the fact that trade in it is legal has helped reduce the illegal ivory trade.

== See also ==
- Body piercing
- Body piercing jewellery
- Earring
- Glass
- Autoclave
- Titanium
- Gold
- Silver
- Niobium
- Bronze

== Sources ==
- Organic LLC: Information on care of natural materials, endangered wood species, possible allergic reactions to wood species, and more
