= Elayne Angel =

American professional body piercer

- Born: Elayne Steinberg; August 6, 1960 (age 65); Los Angeles, California, United States
- Other names: Elayne Binnie, Elayne Levine
- Occupation: Body piercer
- Known for: an originator of contemporary body piercing in the 1980s and in its popular culture emergence in the 1990s

Elayne Angel (born Elayne Steinberg, August 6, 1960) is an American professional body piercer.

== Early life and education ==
Angel attended Canoga Park High School and Chatsworth High School. In 1982, she earned an associate degree in Sign Language Interpreting from Los Angeles Pierce College. She has a certificate from the Fashion Institute of Design & Merchandising in Los Angeles.

== Career ==
Angel became interested in body piercing after a casual encounter with a woman bearing a nipple piercing at a Renaissance Faire in 1981. Through her encounter, she became involved with and employed by Gauntlet, then the first and only, body piercing studio in the United States. While employed by Gauntlet, she worked at the Los Angeles, New York, and San Francisco branches. She was the first recipient of a Master Piercer certificate, from Gauntlet founder Jim Ward, which she received on December 1, 1992. Her technical contributions to the field of body piercing include the invention of several placements, including the fourchette and the lorum piercings.

In December 1993, Angel opened her own studio, Rings of Desire, in the French Quarter of New Orleans, Louisiana. Rings of Desire was the first body piercing studio to receive state licensing from the Health Department in Louisiana. Angel has been involved with the crafting of regulatory legislation regarding body piercing in Louisiana, as well as the training of the professionals who enforce those laws. In this capacity, Angel distributed the research study for the University of South Alabama on the relationship between female sexual satisfaction and vertical clitoral hood piercing. Positive results were published in the American Journal of Obstetrics and Gynecology.

While in New Orleans, she established, with Justine Roig, a store catering to accessories for small dogs called Chiwawa Gaga.

Following Hurricane Katrina in 2005, Angel closed her New Orleans studio and relocated to Mérida, Yucatán, Mexico. In March 2009, her book The Piercing Bible--The Definitive Guide to Safe Body Piercing was published. Although Angel lives in Mexico, she works primarily internationally as a guest body piercer and piercing educator. Since 2005, Angel has been writing a column on piercing for the body art industry trade publication, Pain Magazine.

Angel helped popularize tongue piercing.

== Personal life ==
Angel has been married three times, first to porn director Ernest Greene (also known as Ira Levine), who later became porn star Nina Hartley's husband. Angel and Greene married in Century City, California on February 14, 1987; they divorced in 1988. Angel was also married to English tattooer Alex Binnie from 1991-1996.

Angel later married trans man porn actor Buck Angel in New Orleans in 2003. They divorced under controversial circumstances in 2014, with Elayne Angel claiming he was not eligible for alimony payments due to Buck Angel's gender status under Louisiana law. Elayne Angel lost the case in a California court.

== Trademark tattoo ==
Angel is widely known for a large tattoo of angel wings on her back. The lower right wing is interrupted by a heart with a banner across it reading "slave". This design, which was the inspiration for the logo for her studio, was registered as a U.S. service mark (No. 2,645,270, issued November 5, 2002) and was done in 1987 by Bob Roberts of Spotlight Tattoo in Los Angeles, California. It has since been cancelled due to the registration not being renewed. After receiving the service mark for this design, the circled "R" was added to her right buttock by tattooist Joey Galiger at the advice of her attorney.

In addition to her trademark tattoo, Angel is heavily pierced and tattooed.

Her image is well known in the community from an uncredited photo by Sheree Rose featuring her then incomplete wings, in the seminal publication Modern Primitives, published in 1989.

== Sources ==
- Millner, W.S., Eichold, B.H., Sharpe, T.H., & Lynn, S.C. (2005). First glimpse of the functional benefits of clitoral hood piercings. American Journal of Obstetrics and Gynecology, 193(3), 675-676.
- Lawdit Reading Room UK Article About Copyright/Registration of Tattoos
- Los Angeles Times Abstract of archived 1992 Los Angeles Times article on the piercing career of Elayne Angel née Binnie
