= Aztec body modification =

Aztec body modification (or body alteration) was practiced by the members of the Aztec Empire in Mesoamerica. Many times the body modification was used in ritual or ceremonial practices. It was also a crucial part of movement between major life stages.

== History ==
The Aztecs were not the only group in Mesoamerica to practice extensive body modification. The Maya had a great history of body modification and arguably so did the Olmec and other major groups. Indeed, ritual practices that included many forms of body modification iare ey in the list of tenets that are cultural traits shared that make Mesoamerica a "culture area", an idea proposed by anthropologist Paul Kirchhoff.

It is possible that many of the ritual practices may have come from the ritual practice of autosacrifice, the practice of bloodletting on oneself. It had a potent tie to the shamanistic and religious beliefs of the Aztec. By drawing blood they appeased their primary god, Huitzilopochtli.

== Hard structure modifications ==
=== Skeletal ===
The cultures of Mesoamerica were well known for making skeletal modifications, and the Aztec certainly practiced these as well. Book 8 of the Florentine Codex speaks of a practice that the Aztec used in ritualistic ceremonies in which "children were grabbed by the neck to make them grow tall". This process may have caused changes in skeletal structure, due to stretched muscle attachments.

=== Cranial ===
Cranial modification was a procedure that occurred when an individual was still young, usually during infancy because the cranial bones are still soft at this stage and capable of morphing. An infant would be bound between padded boards to cause a tabular effect in the growth of the skull. Another method was to wind a band tightly around the head for an annular effect. Both of these methods produced an elongated shape of the head. This practice was seen as a desirable trait and often practiced in the upper classes; however it could be common on women in working positions because they would often carry children on their back for lengthy periods of time.

=== Dental ===
Teeth were another skeletal body part that was modified, usually by filing the tooth. Precious stones were often placed into bored holes in the teeth; some precious stones were jadeite, pyrite, or turquoise. This practice was most likely done when an individual was reaching young adulthood, as can be determined through the dating of the teeth found with these stones placed inside them. These alterations of the teeth most likely caused dental abscesses and possibly infection.

== Piercings ==
Piercings are well represented both in documents and archaeological evidence. They may relate back to the autosacrifical ceremonies in which thorns or stingray spines would be drawn through the skin to cause bleeding for appeasement of the gods.

=== Ears ===
Ear piercings occurred among both males and females. Children first had their ears pierced at an early age. Ears would often be pierced with a bone awl or a maguey spine then a string would be thread throedugh them until they reached the age in whath they could add ornaments to them. Ears would then be stretched systematically until they could hold the ear spools that were highly desired and given only to persons of a certain age as a show of maturation.

=== Lips ===
Boys that were intended to enter military positions had their lips pierced at a young age. These lip piercings would then later have an ornament placed in them and be systematically stretched as they took prisoners of war. The existence of lip plugs on full-grown male adults suggested that they had done well militarily and had a career in the military. This, of course, suggested that only males had lip plugs.

=== Labrets ===
Aztec men and women practiced labret piercing. The initial piercing, like ear and lip piercings, did not include the ornament being placed in the freshly pierced skin. Part of this was the ritual movement of becoming an adult in which ornamentation signified adulthood. Another reason was that it allowed for more bloodletting practices and appeasement of deities throughout this time.

== Skin modifications ==
=== Tattoos ===
Tattoos are less commonly found than skeletal modifications because of the lessened likelihood of preservation, there is documentary evidence to suggest that tattooing occurred with the Aztec. Ceramic seals have been found that may have been used to make an imprint on the skin before the tattoo was indelibly marked into the skin by the way of bone awls, maguey thorns, or other items. Guerrero, a Spanish explorer, also states that he received tattoos on his face after being acclimated to native life in Mexico.

=== Scarification ===
Scarification refers to the permanent and intentional marking of the skin causing scars. There are multiple ways it can be done, but the most common in use in Mesoamerica was scarring inflicted by a stingray spine. Scarification was relatively limited to the priestly caste in Aztec society. Instead of being given the lip piercing that denoted military profession, boys devoted to the religious life would receive scars on their chests and hips at the same age as boys receiving the lip piercing.

=== Branding ===
Branding refers to scars given intentionally through a source of heat, usually fire. The "singeing ceremony" was given to both Aztec boys and girls. It is uncertain of the age in which this ritual occurred. It was indicative of becoming one with the stars, as the burns on the wrists were aligned with certain constellations. A stick that had been placed in a fire would be pressed onto the skin of the child and the scar was thus given. It was an important body marking showing progression in age.
