= Alex Binnie =

Alex Binnie may refer to:

- Alexander Binnie (1839–1917), British civil engineer
- Alex Binnie (footballer) (1901–1988), Scottish footballer
- Alex Binnie (tattoo artist) (born 1959), English tattooist and printmaker
