= Association of Professional Piercers =

International association for body piercing professionals

- Abbreviation: APP
- Formation: 1994; 32 years ago
- Headquarters: California, United States
- Region served: United States
- Members: 1,000+
- President: Rebecca Dill
- Website: safepiercing.org

The Association of Professional Piercers (APP) is an international non-profit group for body piercing professionals based in the United States. It is the oldest and longest running organization for professional piercing.

== History ==
The Association of Professional Piercers was founded in 1994 by Michaela Grey and colleagues. The first members were professional piercers from Nomad, Gauntlet and other early piercing studios. Established in 1994 as an international nonprofit organization, the California-based organization is dedicated to the dissemination of vital health and safety information about body piercing to piercers, health care professionals, legislators, and the general public. It is a nonprofit voluntary alliance dedicated to the dissemination of information about body piercing.

The organization works to disseminate information to both customers and piercers, and they work with legal assistance for countries with limited piercing laws.

The APP is the publisher of The Point: Journal of Body Piercing, a quarterly newsletter dedicated to piercing-related news and information.

== APP Direction ==
The APP has a voluntary elected Board of Directors.

- Brian Skellie – President
- Pablo Perelmuter – Vice President
- Taís Fernandes – Secretary
- Paul King – Treasurer
- Sala – Board Member
- Lola Slider – Newly Elected Directors
- Barron William – Membership Liaison
- Suzanne Hallett – Medical Liaison

== Core Functions of the APP ==
The APP has a list of responsibilities listed on the website.

- Provides a professional association for piercers with set standards.
  - However, the APP does not license or certify piercers. Members receive a certificate of membership which must be renewed every year. Attendees of APP classes receive a seminar certificate.
  - Responds to and resolve complaints against its members.
  - Does not dictate the piercing technique(s) its Members use, what aftercare they suggest, or what specific piercings they may choose to performs
- Provides piercers, legislators, and the public with support and assistance in drafting appropriate body art legislation and regulation in the industry.
- Hosts an annual conference for piercers.
  - Provides piercing technique, business, and health education classes at Annual Conference for piercers, health inspectors, and others related to the industry.
  - Does not allow piercings performed at its annual conference, nor does it teach people how to pierce. The APP provides supplemental education to piercers and has a number of Corporate Sponsors who provide basic piercing education.
- Provides educational and informational materials, including consumer-oriented brochures and Health and Safety Procedure Manual for piercers.
  - Staffs an email/phone response system for individuals with questions regarding piercing.
  - Maintains a website with information on body piercings.
  - Provides information to the media when requested and in response to misinformation
  - Presents lectures to students, health care professionals, and other related groups. Attends and is involved in health related conferences.

== Examples of APP standards ==
=== Standards for Tools and Techniques for Initial Piercings ===
Despite claiming (above under APP Outreach) "Does not dictate the piercing technique(s) its Members use ..." Under their "A Piercee's Bill of Rights" they explicitly do not allow the use of piercing guns: "4. To know that piercing guns are NEVER appropriate, and are often dangerous when used on anything—including earlobes."

=== Minimum Standards for Jewelry for Initial Piercings ===
From Body piercing materials: Products with an ISO or ASTM designation are so noted and a statement specifying the finish requirements particular to body jewelry has been added. In addition, several materials designated for applications other than implants have been proven through historical and practical application to be suitably biocompatible for initial piercing.
