= Lip piercing =

Type of body piercing

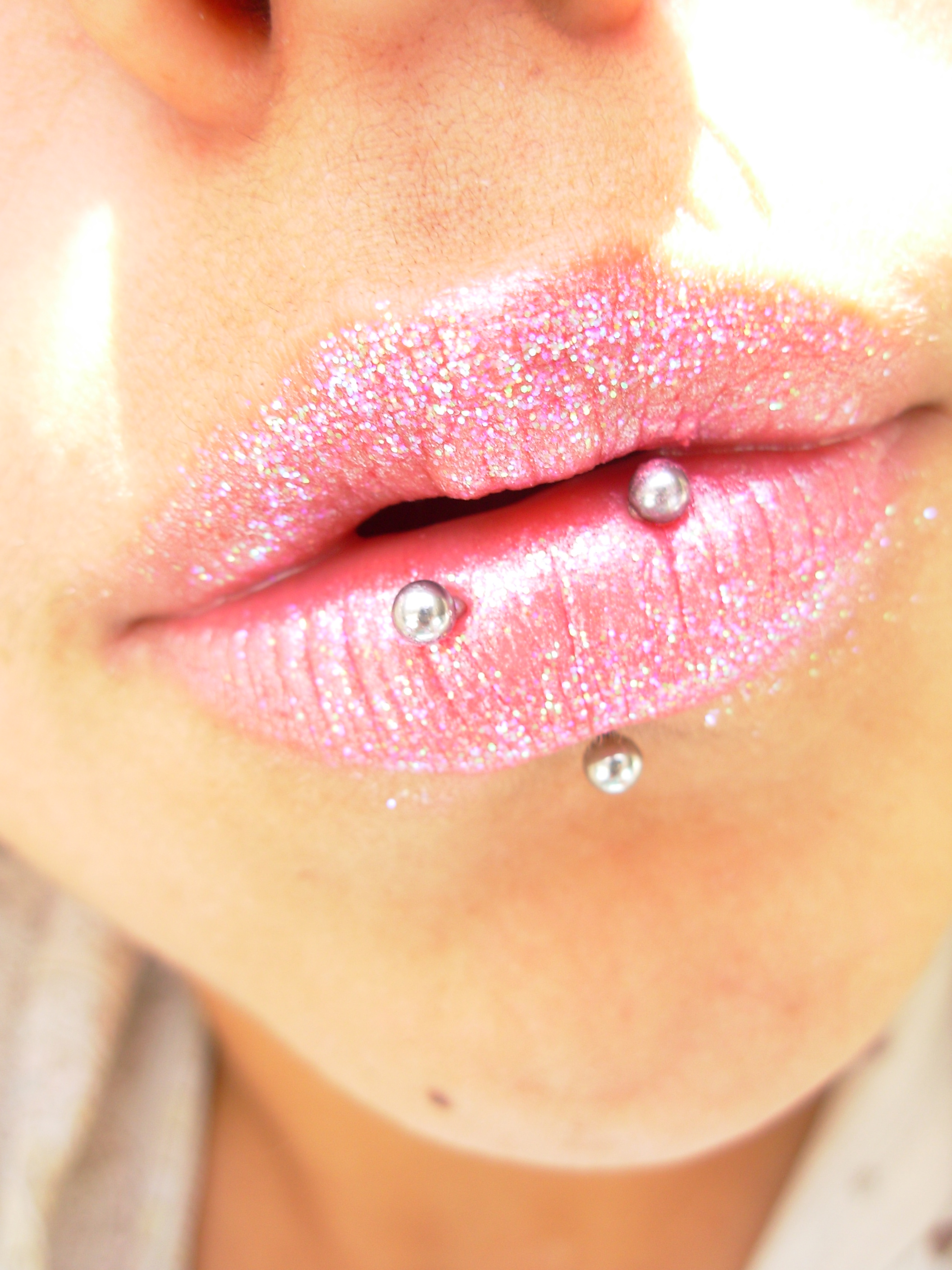
- A person with a horizontal labret piercing (going across the lips) and a labret piercing (under the lips)
- Nicknames: Various, depending on placement
- Location: Upper, lower or middle lip
- Healing: 6 to 8 weeks

A lip piercing is a type of body piercing that penetrates the lips or the area surrounding the lips, which can be pierced in a variety of ways.

== Procedure and healing ==
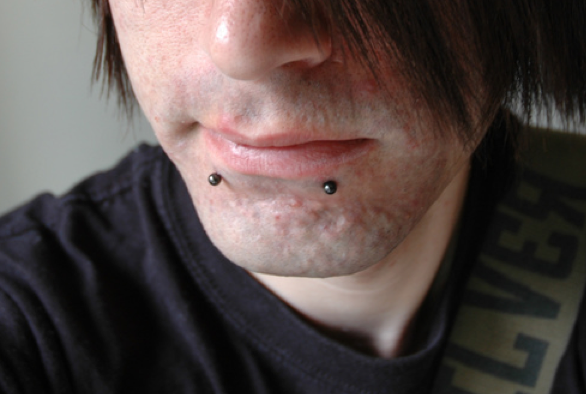
Lip piercings are sometimes worn in pairs or sets.

Approximate healing time for most lip piercings is between 1 and 3 months; however, there is a possibility of serious infection if the piercing is not properly taken care of. After healing is complete, other jewelry may be used. After this time, some scar tissue may be present, but the fistula is normally fully developed and mostly healed. Aftercare consists of hot saline soaks two to three times daily. Soaking the wound for three to five minutes with a weak saline solution softens any blood and lymph discharge attached to the jewelry. Afterwards, taking a hot shower and using clean hands and a small amount of a mild soap such as castile soap removes excess matter from the site. Turning or otherwise moving jewelry on a fresh piercing is not advised, as it can irritate and lengthen swelling and healing time. Diluted mouthwash or salt water solution can also be used after meals along with toothbrushing to help remove debris and flush the piercing and is recommended by practitioners.

Initial jewelry is usually a labret stud or a captive bead ring, manufactured from implant-grade titanium or similar lightweight and inert metal. No matter which type of jewelry is used, the jewelry's diameter and length will be intentionally oversized to allow room for initial swelling. After healing, the jewelry can be replaced with a closer-fitting piece. A home-made saline solution made from non-iodized sea salt and hot distilled or filtered water is a common way to heal a lip piercing and avoid infection. This solution can be used to rinse out the mouth after eating (or the mouth can be rinsed with non-alcoholic, non-antimicrobial mouth wash) and to soak the outside of the piercing. Anything with alcohol, peroxide, iodine, or any strong soaps should be avoided because they may irritate the fresh piercing, and cause additional swelling and trauma during the healing process. Using peroxide, iodine, teatree oil, conventional antibacterial soap, or dish soap can damage or kill the skin in and around the piercing, extending the healing process. The use of Hydrogen peroxide can damage the piercing site more, resulting in irritation of the piercing. The ornament should be periodically cleansed to prevent bacterial plaque accumulation.

== Types ==
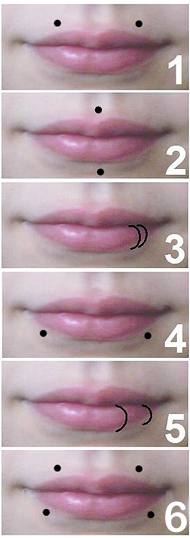
Some piercings are called bites: 1. Angel bites; 2. Cyber bites; 3. Spider bites; 4. Snake bites; 5. Vampire bites; 6. Canine bites

Lip piercings can be placed anywhere around the mouth, but the surface of the lip is not typically pierced itself, except for horizontal lip piercings and canine bites. Piercings in specific positions have certain names. Monroe piercings, for example, are labret studs worn on the upper lip where Marilyn Monroe had her famous beauty mark. Medusa piercings go through the center of the upper lip (the philtrum), perpendicular to the tissue. Labret piercings are pierced with a labret stud and can pierced in the center or off-center. A variation of this is the lowbret, a lower labret. Vertical labret piercings go through the center of the bottom lip, parallel to the tissue. The variation is called the vertical lowbret, which starts inside the mouth between the lower lip and the teeth and travels straight down, exiting on the lower edge of the jawline. Horizontal lip piercings are very rare, and include a horizontal bar on the lower lip that goes through the lip surface. Another variation of the labret is known as the dahlia piercing. The piercings, placed at or very near the corners of the mouth, are named in reference to the murder of Black Dahlia, in which the victim's mouth was cut along the same horizontal line along which these piercings are placed. (See Glasgow smile.)

== History and culture ==
Precolumbian cultures of South America historically used lip piercing called Tembetá. Lip piercing continues to be practiced by many people, the most well-known of which are certain African tribes, who wear large decorative lip plates or discs, usually in the lower lip.

In contemporary society, lip piercings are relatively common. In a study among Israeli young-adults, 4.3% had present or past body piercing (not included earlobe, lip or intra-oral piercing), and 5.7%, 6.2% and 15.7% had present or past lip piercing, body tattooing and intra-oral piercing, respectively.

== Health risks and complications ==
Studies have found people with lip piercings to have 4 to 7 times higher risk of gingival recession than people without piercing. Studies also found a higher percentage of dental trauma in people with lip piercings.

== See also ==
- Body piercing
- Body piercing jewelry
- Labret piercing, a type of lip piercing
- Lip frenulum piercing
- Lip plate, a type of lip piercing
- Monroe piercing, a type of lip piercing
- Philtrum piercing, a type of lip piercing
- Tongue frenulum piercing, another oral piercing
- Tongue piercing, another oral piercing
