= Horst Streckenbach =

German tattoo artist

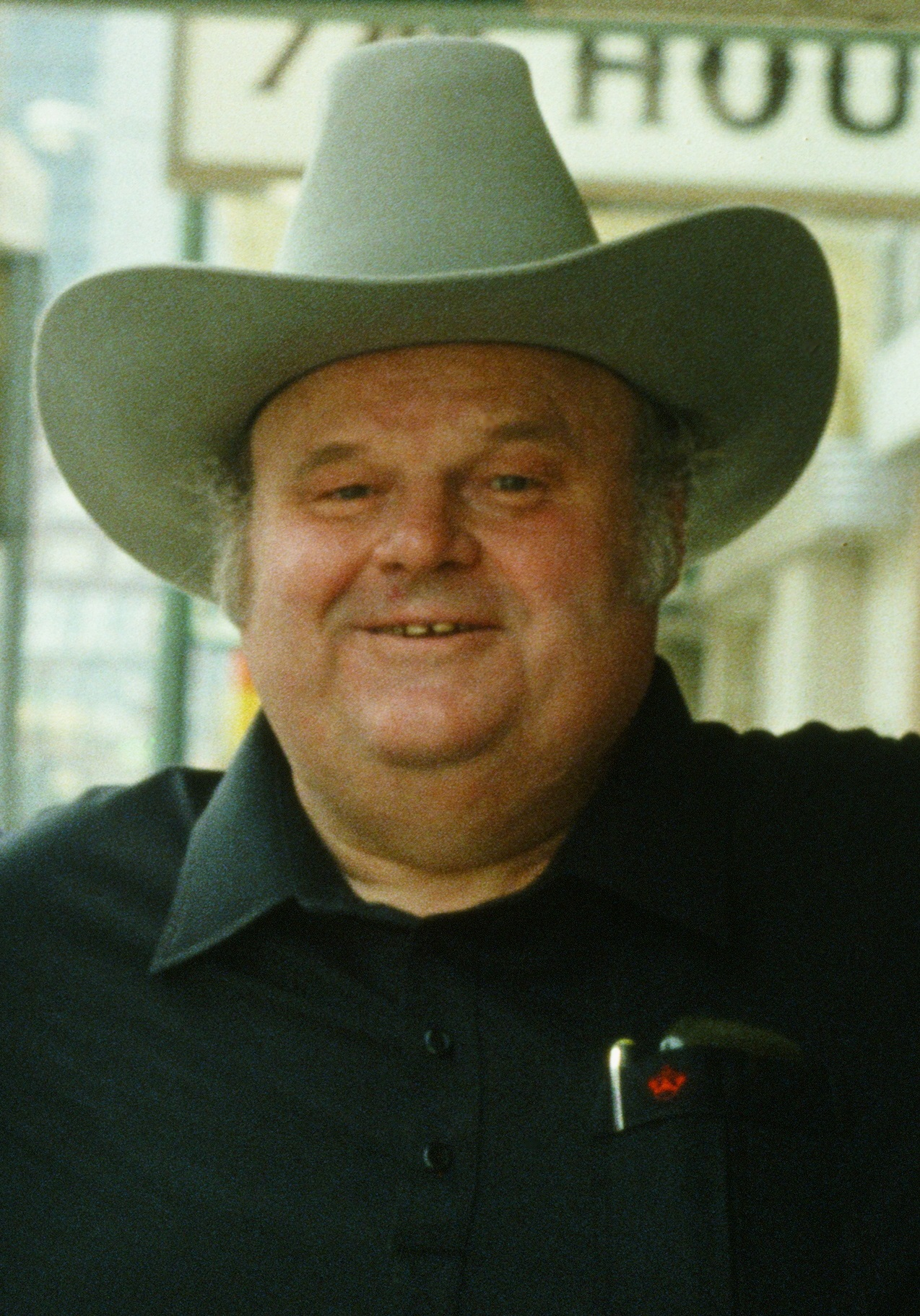
- Streckenbach in San Antonio, 1979
- Born: Helmut Horst Streckenbach; 1925; Weißwasser, Germany
- Died: 2001 (aged 75–76)
- Other name: Tattoo Samy
- Occupations: Tattoo artist, piercer

Horst Streckenbach "Tattoo Samy" (August 5, 1925 – June 27, 2001) was a well-known German tattoo artist and historian of the medium, who had been tattooing since 1946. Streckenbach is considered important in the development of tattooing in Germany. With Manfred Kohrs from Hanover in Germany from 1974 to 1978 he developed a rotary tattoo machine and in 1975 the barbell.

== Biographical and career information ==
Helmut Horst Streckenbach was born in 1925 and grew up in Weißwasser, Schlesien, Germany. He got his first tattoo at the age of ten. In 1946, he began tattooing professionally. In 1959 he opened his own studio in Aschaffenburg and in 1964 he moved to Frankfurt, this studio was open for nearly 40 years. Samy tattooed several notable musicians, artists and celebrities of the time. Over the years Samy went to the United States a number of times and frequently to Los Angeles to visit Jim Ward. On one of his first visits, he showed Ward the barbell studs that he used in some piercings. They were internally threaded, a feature that made so much sense that Ward immediately set out to recreate them for his own customers. On the first National Convention at the Cosmopolitan Hotel in Denver, Colorado from 23–25 March 1979 Tattoo Samy made a slide presentation of tattooed people. The speakers on the convention were: Terry Wrigley, Peter Tat 2 Poulos, Diane Poulos, Don Ed Hardy, Bob Shaw (who even back then spoke about the importance of using Autoclaves and keeping you and your place clean), Big Walt Kilkucki, Painless Jeff Baker, Dave Yurkew, and Arnold Rubin & Jan Stussy. Streckenbach, Kohrs and Terry Wrigley (1932–1999) -President of E.T.A.A-, present 17–19 October 1980 at Frankfurt the first "Tattoo Convention" in Germany. Samy appeared in PFIQ (the first publication about body piercing) in issues #18 (1983) and #19 as the magazine’s first documented tongue piercing.

== Innovations ==
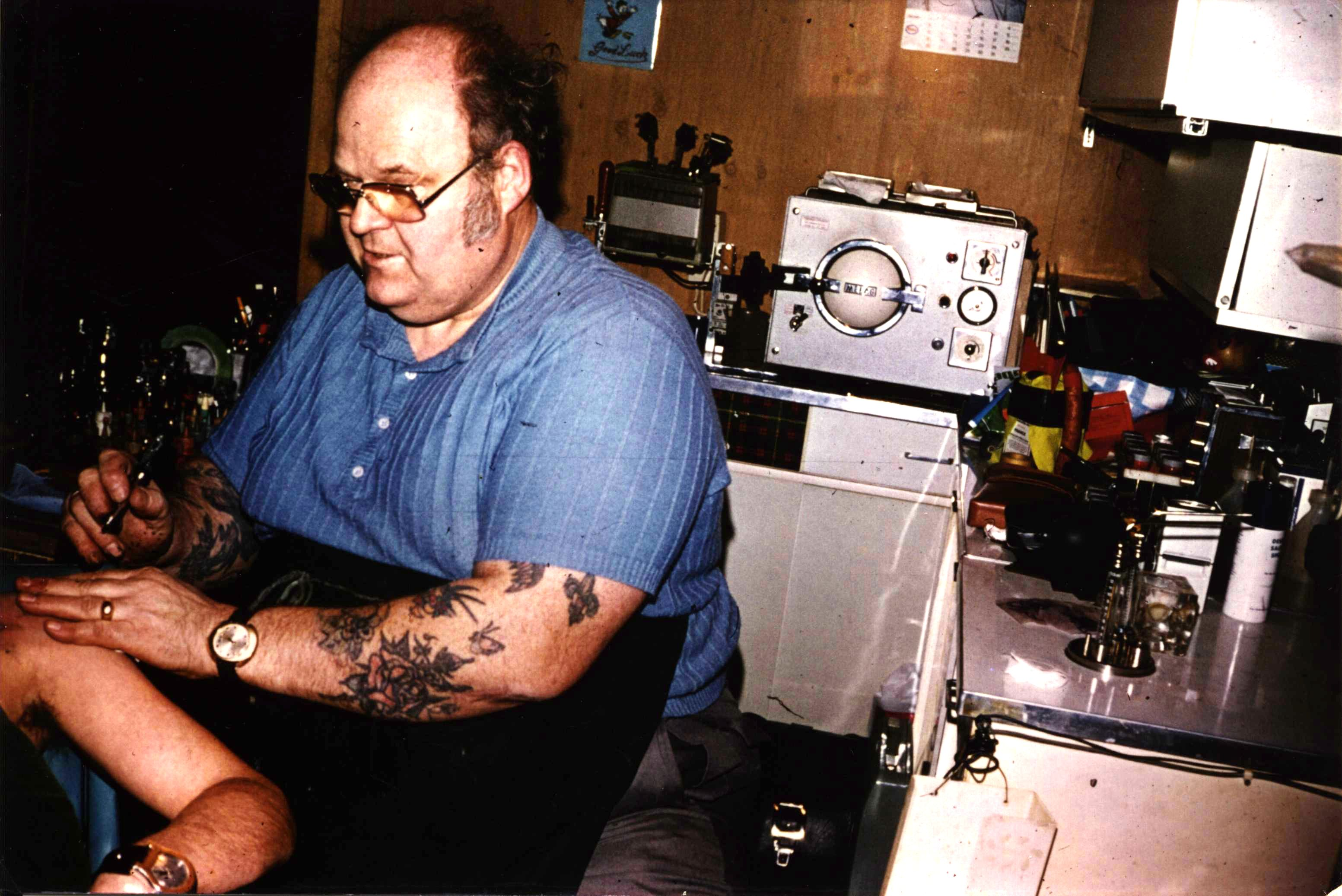
Streckenbach Tattoo-Studio 1979

Streckenbach and Kohrs pioneered many jewelry designs including the fixed bead ring and internally threaded barbells. Samy introduced Jim Ward to barbell style jewelry. "The first barbells I recall came from Germany. Doug had made contact with Tattoo Samy, a tattooist and piercer from Frankfurt. Over the years Samy came to the States a number of times and frequently showed up in LA to visit Doug. On one of his first visits he showed us the barbell studs that he used in some piercings. They were internally threaded, a feature that made so much sense that I immediately set out to recreate them for my own customers."Jim Ward Phil Andros: "A German tattoist named Horst Streckenbach invented a radically different tattoo pen, with each instrument containing its own small motor was attached an irregular camwheel that furnished the up and down movement."

== Art ==
In 1981, the German conceptual artist Timm Ulrichs had THE END tattooed on his right eyelid by Streckenbach. The tattoo, which can only be read when the eye is closed, recalls the final credits of a film, the last performance and the final moment. This tattoo event was also documented on film, created in the context of the video of the same name which juxtaposes 60 final images.

=== Selected bibliography ===
- Samuel M. Steward: Bad Boys and Tough Tattoos. Routledge London & New York 1990, ISBN 0-918393-76-0.
- Margot Mifflin: Bodies of Subversion. powerHouse Books 2013, ISBN 1-576-87692-6.
- Caroline Rosenthal, Dirk Vanderbeke: Probing the Skin: Cultural Representations of Our Contact Zone. Cambridge Scholars Publishing 2015, ISBN 1-443-87518-X.
- Marcel Feige: Das Tattoo-und Piercing Lexikon. Schwarzkopf & Schwarzkopf 2000, ISBN 3-89602-209-1.
  - Tattoo Sammy appeared in PFIQ #18 (1983) and #19 as the magazine’s first documented tongue piercing.
