= Alex Binnie (tattoo artist) =

English tattooist and printmaker

- Born: 11 July 1959 (age 66); Oxford, England
- Occupations: Tattoo artist, Printmaker
- Known for: Tribal/non-western work
- Website: http://www.alexbinnie.com

Alex Binnie (born Alexander Michael Steven Binnie, 11 July 1959, Oxford, England) is a tattooist, and printmaker; he has been a musician and performance artist.

As a tattoo artist he is known for being one of a group of artists who originated and popularized the use of large-scale tribal design (non-western, often Polynesian, and also involving elements of fusion across regional boundaries and traditions) in the West. His work reached a wide public with the publication of 1000 Tattoos by Henk Schiffmacher.

== Education and career ==
Alex Binnie graduated with a BA (Hons) in Fine Art from South Glamorgan Faculty of Art and Design in 1982. He became a medical artist in 1985, first an AV technician at Royal Postgraduate Medical School, then a medical illustrator at United Medical and Dental Schools of Guy's and St Thomas' Hospitals.

His first tattoo studio in London was an unlicensed studio called 'Mother Art'. It received some publicity from a newsletter published by Genesis P-Orridge and offered early clients as much tattooing as they could stand in one sitting for 10 pounds sterling.

He moved to Los Angeles, California, from 1991 to 1993, initially tattooing at the Gauntlet studio in West Hollywood managed by his then-wife Elayne Binnie (now Elayne Angel owner of Rings of Desire and author of The Piercing Bible). Following this he worked at Body Electric on Melrose Ave, and then travelled to Seattle, working with Vyvyn Lazonga.

Binnie returned to London in 1993 and established Into You Tattoo in Clerkenwell. In 2005, he established Into You Brighton with Jason Mosseri.

== Performance ==
In Los Angeles, along with the association with The Gauntlet through his wife Elayne, he collaborated with the performance artist Ron Athey, an association which continued after his Los Angeles period, in various international venues, including London's Torture Garden. He also appeared in Catherine Gund Saalfield's film, Hallelujah! Ron Athey: A Story of Deliverance (1998)

== Music ==
Binnie was a founding member of the power electronics trio Pure in the early 1980s, along with Mathew Bower. This was experimental music using guitars to create a confrontational wall of noise, rather than the synthesizers employed by Whitehouse. Later he joined John Gosling's Zos Kia.

== Other art ==
Binnie has been involved in printmaking in quite a different style to that of his tattoo work. He is represented by Ink_d in Brighton and Rise in Berlin. In 2010, a woodcut portrait was accepted into the Royal Academy Summer Exhibition in London. He has also created murals in two New York spaces.

In May 2012, a selection of Binnie's woodcuts is being published in a limited edition book by Kintaro Publishing. It is titled The Woodcut Portraits.

== Personal life ==
Binnie has two children with his former partner Nicola Bowery (née Bateman) widow and performance partner of performance artist Leigh Bowery, and a model of painter Lucian Freud.

In November 2011, Binnie married fellow tattooer Zoe Windle.
