= Tongue frenulum piercing =

Piercing through the frenulum of the tongue

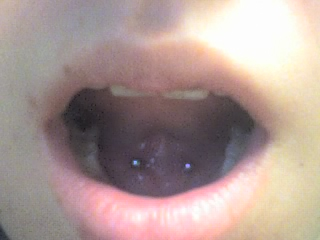
- Nicknames: Tongue web piercing
- Location: Frenulum linguae
- Jewelry: Captive bead ring, Barbell

A tongue frenulum piercing, tongue web piercing, or lingual frenulum piercing is a body piercing through the frenulum underneath the tongue (frenulum linguae). These piercings do have a tendency to migrate over time.

== Jewelry ==
Both ring and curved barbell style jewelry can be worn in these piercings.

== See also ==
- Lip piercing
- Tongue piercing
