= Monroe piercing =

Piercing of the upper lip

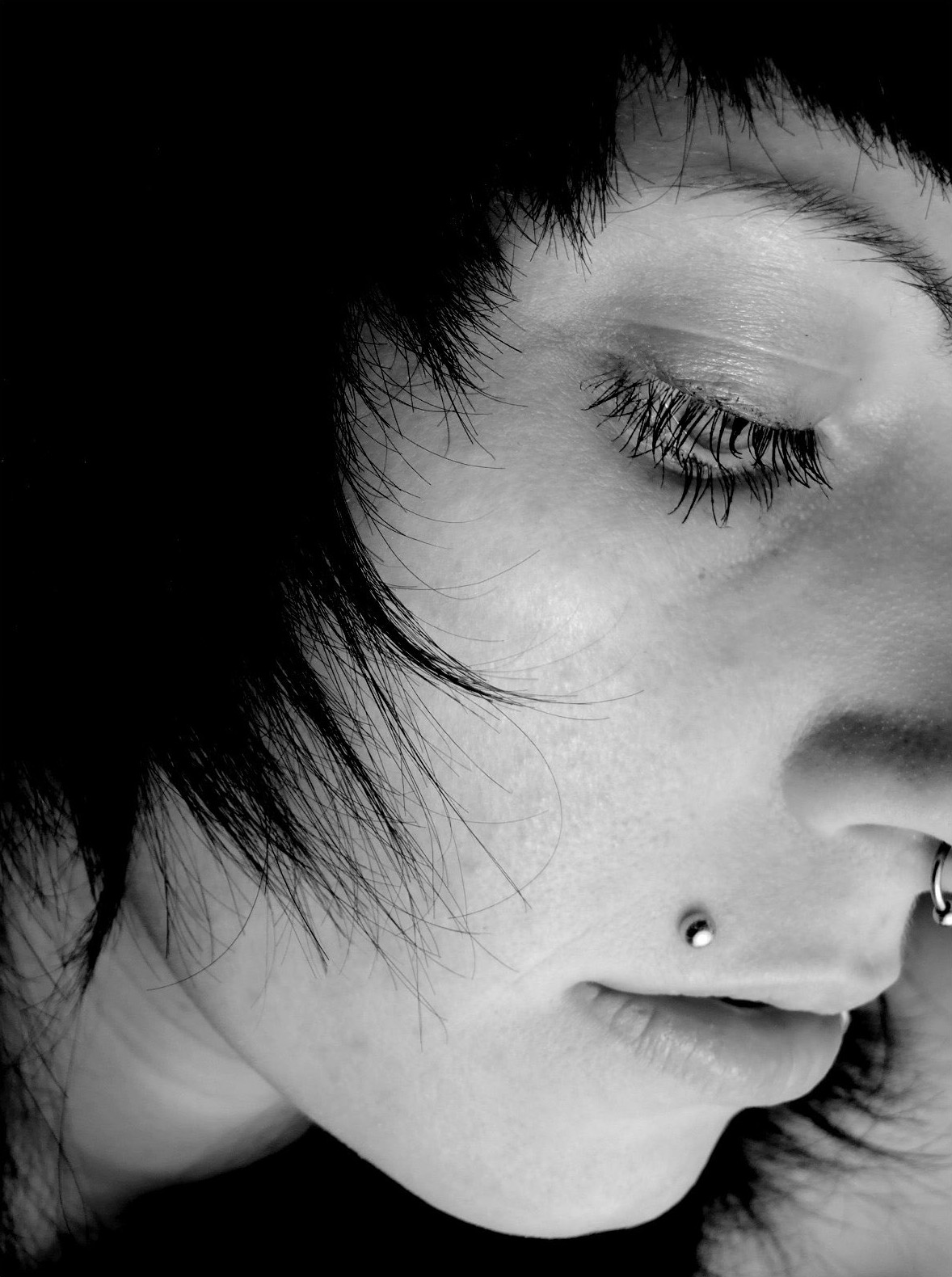
- A Madonna piercing
- Nicknames: Crayfish; Madonna piercing
- Location: Off-center, above top lip, on the right side.
- Jewelry: Labret stud
- Healing: 6–12 weeks

A Monroe piercing is a lip piercing placed off-center, above the upper lip on the left-hand side and is meant to resemble Marilyn Monroe's beauty spot, although Monroe's beauty spot was on her cheek, not her lip. The Madonna piercing is similar but worn on the right-hand side.

== Description ==
This piercing is typically fitted with a 14, 16, or 18 gauge labret barbell, the bars of which are usually shortened after healing. A variation on this piercing are angel bites, with both the Madonna and Monroe style piercings worn on either side of the upper lip. This piercing may also be referred to as a Crayfish, Angel Bites, or Anti Bite (being the obverse of snake bites). When long barbells are worn in this piercing, they look similar to the antennae on a crayfish, hence the name.

== Health impacts ==
An advantage of a Monroe piercing is that the lip area generally heals faster than other piercings. The estimated healing time given by professional piercers for this type of lip piercing is between 8–12 weeks, but many find it heals in 3–6 weeks.

The Monroe can be a very painful piercing process, as this area of the body contains a large system of nerves. There is a small risk of piercing the superior labial artery, which lies just above the upper lip.

The amount of pain experienced during the piercing process differs from person to person and depends on the specific location of the piercing. Those with thicker lips or well-exercised facial muscles will have more flesh or muscle to pierce, so they may experience more discomfort. Men may experience slightly more pain than women, as repeated shaving can make the skin of the upper lip tougher and harder to pierce. The orbicularis oris (the sphincter muscle around the mouth) is used in the playing of brass and woodwind instruments; as a result, players of these instruments tend to have a larger muscle around the mouth and may experience more discomfort during the piercing process.
