= Nickel Directive =

European Union regulation

Directive 94/27/EC
- European Union directive
- Text with EEA relevance
- Title: Directive amending for the 12th time Directive 76/769/EEC on the approximation of the laws, regulations and administrative provisions of the Member States relating to restrictions on the marketing and use of certain dangerous substances and preparations
- Made by: European Parliament and Council
- Made under: Art. 100a (EC)
- Journal reference: L188, 22 July 1994, pp. 1–2

History
- Date made: 30 June 1994
- Entry into force: 30 June 1994
- Implementation date: 30 December 1994

Preparative texts
- Commission proposal: COM (1993) 134 final, C116, 27 April 1993, p. 18
- EESC opinion: C304, 10.11.1993, p. 2
- EP opinion: 2 December 1993, C342, 20 December 1993, p. 15

Other legislation
- Amends: Dir. 76/769/EEC
- Amended by: Dir. 2004/96/EC
- Replaced by: § 27, Ann. XVII, Reg. (EC) No 1907/2006

The Nickel Directive was a European Union directive regulating the use of nickel in jewellery and other products that come into contact with the skin. Since 1 June 2009, it has been subsumed into the REACH Regulation, specifically item 27 of Annex XVII to that regulation. Nevertheless, the term Nickel Directive is still used to refer to the restrictions on nickel usage and the prescribed test method for quantifying nickel release from products EN 1811.

Allergy to nickel is a common cause of contact dermatitis, with roughly 10% of the population in Western Europe and North America being sensitive to nickel. Initial sensitisation frequently occurs from jewellery such as ear studs and other body piercings, and nickel allergy is more prevalent among women than men. Once sensitised, an individual can develop contact dermatitis from shorter term contact with nickel-containing products: this is a particular problem given the use of nickel in coinage, such as the European one- and two-euro coins and the Canadian five-cent piece. This led to moves by two European countries to prevent the initial sensitisation of jewellery wearers by limiting the use of nickel in piercing studs and other products which are in prolonged contact with the skin, and then to the European Union Nickel Directive in 1994.

The Nickel Directive imposes limits on the amount of nickel that may be released from jewellery and other products intended to come into direct and prolonged contact with the skin. These limits, known as migration limits, are:

- 0.2 μg/cm^{2}/week for post assemblies which are inserted into pierced ears and other pierced parts of the human body; (Note: The original Nickel Directive imposed a limit on the amount of nickel which could be used in post assemblies (mass fraction < 0.05%). This was modified to a migration limit in 2004.)
- 0.5 μg/cm^{2}/week for other products intended to come into direct and prolonged contact with the skin.

Nickel release is measured by a test method known as EN 1811, which involves placing the object in an artificial sweat solution for one week, then measuring nickel by atomic absorption spectroscopy or any other appropriate technique (e.g. ICP-MS). Other, equivalent test methods may also be accepted. Wear and corrosion can be simulated by a method known as EN 12472.

== Research ==
A study published in the March 2004 issue of the British Journal of Dermatology, which examined the effects of nickel exposure from coins, cited the directive as an important policy, and recommended Nordic gold as a better material for minting coins.
