= Lip frenulum piercing =

Type of body piercing

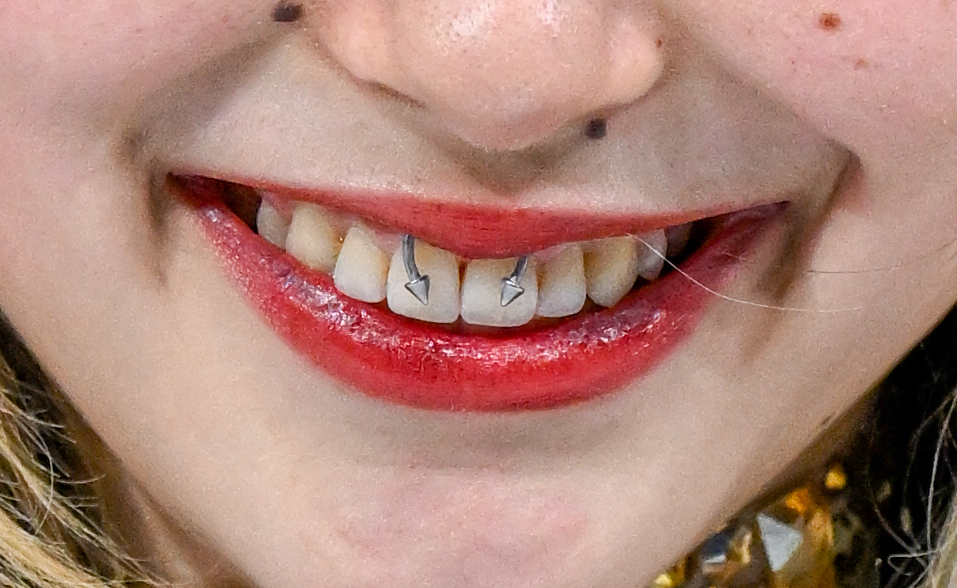
- Figure skater Alysa Liu's upper lip frenulum piercing
- Nicknames: Smiley, scumper, frowny
- Location: F. labii superioris
- Jewelry: Barbell, captive bead ring
- Healing: 4–12 weeks

A lip frenulum piercing is a body piercing through the frenulum of either the upper or lower lip. A piercing through the upper lip frenulum (frenulum labii superioris) is sometimes called a "smiley", because it is usually only seen when smiling, or a "scrumper". Similarly, the lower lip frenulum piercing is sometimes referred to as a "frowny". Jewelry is recommended to be worn in the piercing for a short period of time because the risks associated with it are high.

== Risks ==
Gum recession, teeth erosion, and teeth enamel damage are possible problems that can arise from lip frenulum piercings as a result of the piercing jewelry, especially if it is a captive bead ring, rubbing against the teeth and gums. Additionally, as with many piercings, infection is a risk, especially if the jewelry is not made of hypoallergenic material. The risk of jewelry migration is particularly high for lip frenulum piercings because the tissue of the lip frenulum is very thin and its area very small.

== See also ==
- Body modification
- Lip piercing
