= Gauntlet (body piercing studio) =

Defunct American body piercing business

- Industry: body piercing
- Founded: November 1975
- Founder: Jim Ward
- Defunct: 1998
- Headquarters: USA
- Key people: Jim Ward, Elayne Angel
- Products: body jewelry
- Owner: Jim Ward

The Gauntlet, also known as Gauntlet Enterprises, was a body piercing business founded by Jim Ward that is considered the first business of its type in the United States and was the beginning of the body piercing industry.

It was inspired by Ward's friend and mentor, Doug Malloy. The Gauntlet began in November 1975, with its original location in Ward's West Hollywood home, but on the evening of Friday, November 17, 1978 it celebrated the grand opening of its first commercial location at 8720 Santa Monica Blvd. (also in West Hollywood). Eventually, Gauntlet opened stores in San Francisco, New York City, and Seattle, as well as a franchise in Paris.

The Gauntlet's clientele originated from the gay S&M communities of Southern California and Northern California and during the years that Ward ran his business from his home, many Gauntlet customers came from a group of gay Los Angeles men known as the T&P Group (for Tattooing & Piercing). The Gauntlet became known as a fashionable location for body piercing and its customer base grew beyond its original roots. At its heyday, The Gauntlet operated a strong mail order business for piercing jewelry and manufactured its own jewelry. Eventually, manufacturing operations were contracted out to other companies. Not only did The Gauntlet manufacture jewelry, Ward and his team developed a number of the types of body jewelry in use today. This included coining the terms "barbell", "circular barbell", and "captive bead ring". The work done by Ward and others at this studio set the standard for the body piercings most commonly practiced in modern commercial settings.

In addition to selling body jewelry and related equipment, The Gauntlet published a periodical called PFIQ, or Piercing Fans International Quarterly. Originally a mostly black and white newsletter, PFIQ evolved into a full-color glossy with photos, artwork, stories and tips related to body piercing. During its years of publication, PFIQ was the principal source for information on body piercing. A related publication, Pin Pals, was a newsletter in which pierced people could place classified personal advertisements.

In 1996, The Gauntlet received the Business of the Year award as part of the Pantheon of Leather Awards.

Eventually, The Gauntlet experienced financial difficulties and the illness of Jim Ward further contributed to its woes. After operating more than 20 years, The Gauntlet closed its doors in late 1998.

== Gauntlet Master Piercers ==
Beginning in 1992, several of the Gauntlet body piercers were awarded the certification of Senior and Master Piercer. Many of these individuals went on to become influential in the body piercing community, training later generations of body piercers, owning their own stores and evolving the craft to suit the needs of their clients, maintaining sterility standards as well as jewelry trends.

- Elayne Angel – the first person certified as a Master Piercer.
- Michaela Grey – Director of the Gauntlet Piercing Seminars and later founder of the Association of Professional Piercers.
- Dan Kopka – Trained many of the piercers who worked at the Gauntlet New York City studio.
- Mark Seitchik – Long time piercer at the Gauntlet San Francisco studio and later manager at the New York studio.
- Paul King – Long time piercer at the Gauntlet in San Francisco and Los Angeles and later owner of Cold Steel America, a body piercing studio in San Francisco.
- Fakir Musafar – Introduced to Jim Ward by a mutual friend in the early 1970s, Fakir became heavily involved with Jim's fledgling company, Gauntlet. Fakir was integral to the content of PFIQ, a magazine published by the Gauntlet.
