= Labret =

Form of body piercing

Vertical labret
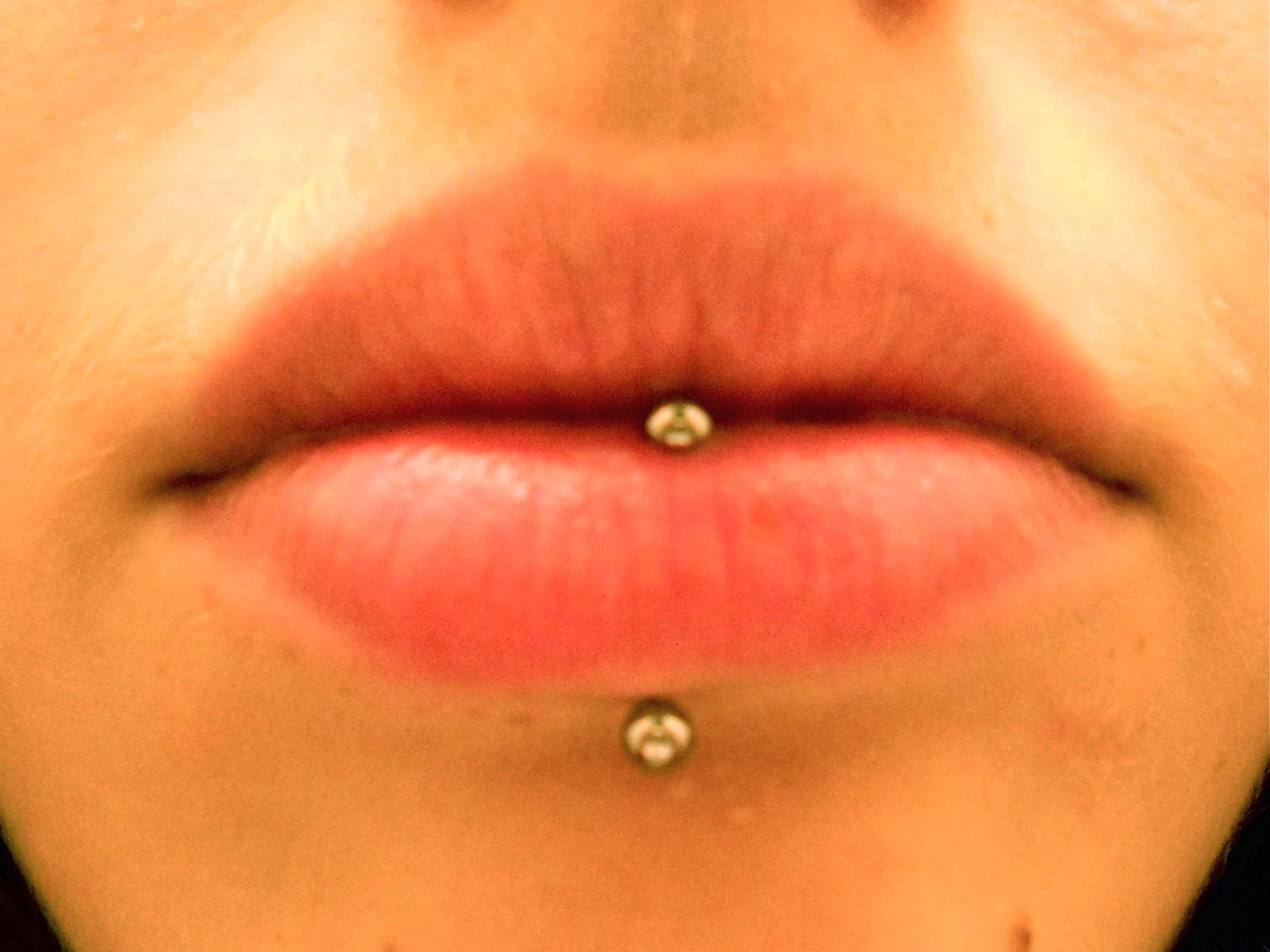
- Nicknames: Mao
- Location: Labrum (below bottom lip, above chin)
- Healing: Ranging from 6-9 months

A labret (also termed a lip plug) is a form of body piercing. Taken literally, it is any type of adornment that is attached to the lip (labrum). However, the term usually refers to a piercing that is below the bottom lip, above the chin. It is sometimes referred to as a "tongue pillar" or a "soul patch piercing".

== Pronunciation ==
The traditional pronunciation of labret is /ˈleɪbrət/ or /ˈleɪbrɪt/ in American and British English, respectively, and in either case LAY-bruht. It derives from the Latin labrum, meaning "lip", and the diminutive suffix -et. Many in the body-piercing industry, however, give it the pronunciation /lɒˈbreɪ/ lo-BRAY, under the incorrect assumption that the word derives from French. The French word is in fact borrowed from English.

== Anthropology ==
=== American Northwest Coast ===
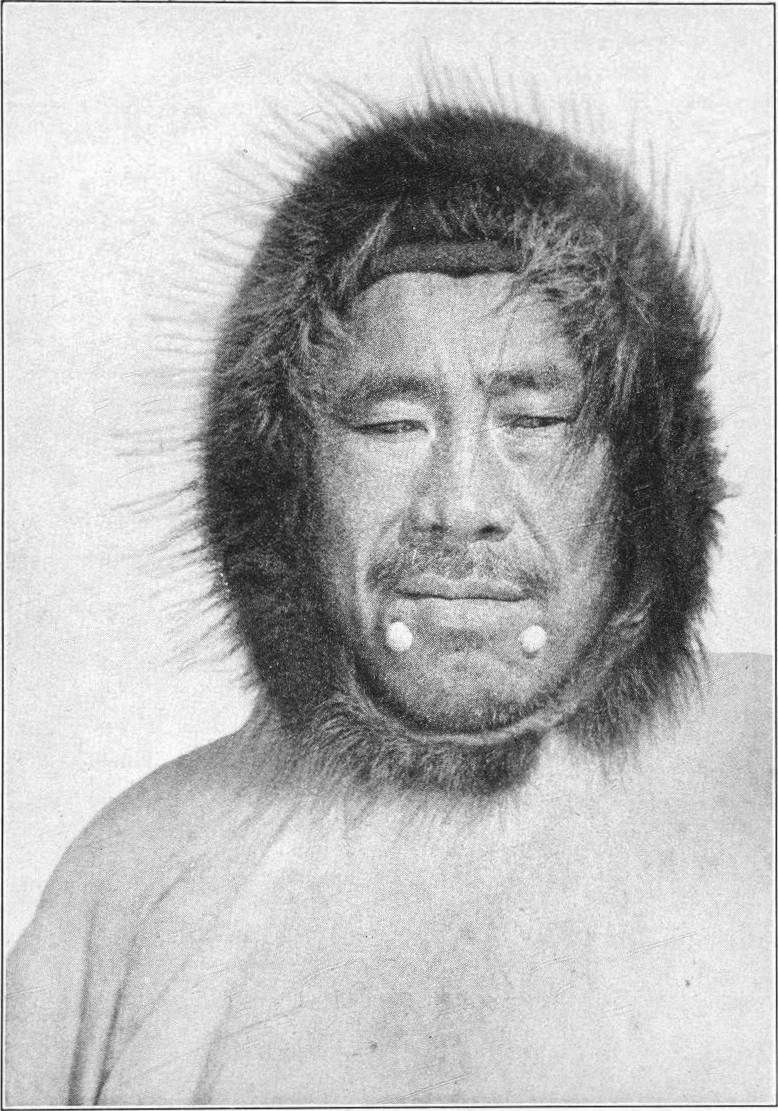
Anguisinaoq, a man from Baillie Island in Canada's Northwest Territories, wearing labrets between 1921 and 1924. They were considered "old school" at the time.

The labret was a traditional piercing among the American Northwest Coast Indians, where it was related to status:

After 3,500 BP, a divergence in labret wear in north and south coasts. In the north from 1500–3500 BP, more labrets worn by males. After 1500 BP, labrets worn by females. In the south, between 2000–3500 BP, worn by males and females, but from 2000 BP on, labrets generally disappear and are replaced by cranial deformation by free males and females of whatever class (e.g. elite or commoner). So, for 4,000 years on the [northwest coast], it was important to distinguish certain individuals in a very direct manner; either by cranial deformation or by labret wear. Gender and geographical region may also be identified by these methods.

When a mask was being made to represent someone of high status, that mask would likewise have a labret.

=== Canadian Northwest Coast ===
Based on analysis of the history and social context of the labret on the Northwest Coast of British Columbia over the last 5,000 years, Marina LaSalle asserts that "while simple correlations of the labret with 'status' and 'gender' are not wrong, nonetheless they betray the complexity of body ornamentation which, though manifested materially, is highly contextual" and that "the labret is a symbol and expression of social identity that continues to hold significant meaning for the descendants of this heritage."

=== Alaska ===
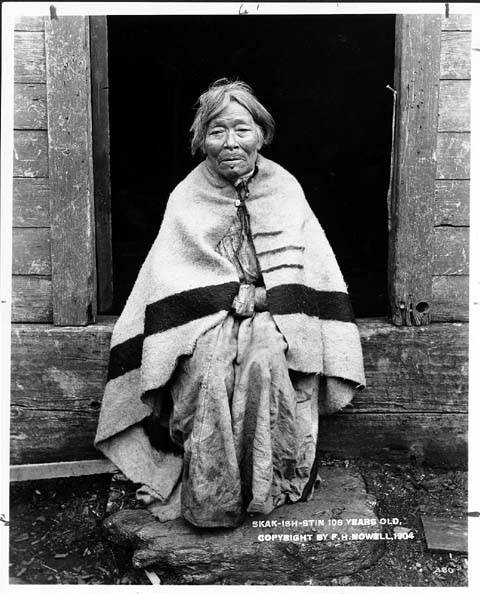
Skak-Ish-Stin wearing a Hudson's Bay Company blanket and labret

The wearing of labrets was widely observed among Tlingit women of high status at the time of European and American arrivals in Southeast Alaska. The Russian term for the Tlingit, Koloshi, derived from an Alutiiq word for labret.

=== Pre-Columbian Americas ===
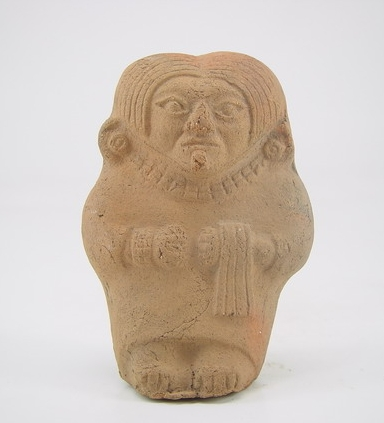
Moche figurine depicting a woman with labret

Labrets were used in certain Pre-Columbian cultures in the Americas, including by the Aztecs. Called tentetl (literally, "lip stone(s)" in the Aztec language Nahuatl, labrets were associated with status and power. The link between labrets and the nobility may have been reinforced by the link between the nobility and eloquence. The title for the leader of the Aztec empire was huei tlahtoani, literally "Great Speaker". Eloquence was expected of nobles; according to Durán, noble children "were told to speak without stuttering, without nervousness or haste". Positioned on the face directly below the lips, labrets likely highlighted the eloquence expected of nobles, and underscored their right to speak and be heard.

== Types of labret piercings ==
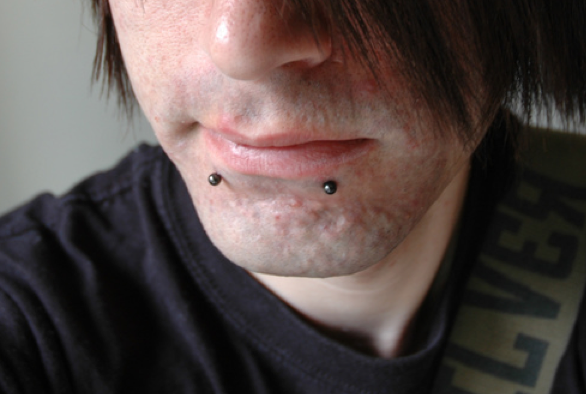
Snakebites

In contemporary styles, there are several different labret variations based on precisely where the piercing is positioned on the lower lip. These include a vertical labret (pierced with a curved barbell through the top of the lower lip rather than in front of the lip tissue), snake bites (dual piercings close together reminiscent of fangs), spiderbites (dual piercings very close together on the same side of the face), and a lowbret, which is placed as low as possible toward the chin. The initial piercing is usually done at 1.2, 1.6 or 2.0 mm diameter. After initial healing, the piercing can be (gradually) further stretched. Some people choose to stretch to sizes over 10 mm, and the jewelry worn at these larger sizes is usually a round or oval 'labret plug'.

== See also ==
- Body piercing aftercare
- Lip piercing
- Lip plate
- Tembetá

== Bibliography ==
- Hajovsky, Patrick Thomas (2015). On the Lips of Others: Moteuczoma's Fame in Aztec Monuments and Rituals. Austin: University of Texas Press. doi:10.7560/766686. ISBN 978-0-292-76668-6. JSTOR 10.7560/766686. LCCN 2014023105.
- Houston, Stephen D. & Cummins, Tom (2004). "Body, Presence, and Space in Andean and Mesoamerican Rulership". In Evans, Susan Toby & Pillsbury, Joanne (eds.). Palaces Of The Ancient New World: A Symposium at Dumbarton Oaks 10th and 11th October 1998. Washington, D.C.: Dumbarton Oaks Research Library and Collection. pp. 359–398. ISBN 0-88402-300-1. LCCN 84-22035.
- Olko, Justyna (2014). Insignia of Rank in the Nahua World: From the Fifteenth to the Seventeenth Century. Boulder: University Press of Colorado. ISBN 978-1-60732-240-5. JSTOR j.ctt6wrrbn.
