= PFIQ =

Defunct body modification magazine

PFIQ - Piercing Fans International Quarterly

- Cover of the last Issue
- Editor-in-chief: Jim Ward
- Categories: Lifestyle magazine
- First issue: 1977; 49 years ago
- Final issue: 1997; 29 years ago
- Company: Gauntlet Enterprises
- Country: United States
- Based in: Los Angeles, U.S.
- Language: English

PFIQ (Piercing Fans International Quarterly) was a magazine published by Jim Ward from 1977 to 1997. It was the first publication about body piercing. Ward pioneered the field of body piercing and operated The Gauntlet, which was the first commercial establishment to offer the service in the United States.

== History and profile ==
The first issue of the magazine appeared in October 1977. The first 14 issues of PFIQ were in black and white with single-color highlights in a few issues. From issue #15 on, the covers and centerfolds were in full color. The first issue was 16 pages long; by issue #31, PFIQ had grown to 32 pages. Page count continued to gradually increase. Issue #50, the final issue, contained 64 pages. All issues were 8½×11" in size.

Only the first five issues were dated on the cover, though most of them included a copyright year. However, every issue was independently numbered. In spite of calling itself a quarterly, the publication was chronically late and the average number of issues per year, over the lifetime of PFIQ, was about 3.

Issues #1 and #3 were reprinted in the 1980s. The reprints are not hard to distinguish from the originals. The original issue #1 was black and white with two spot colors; the reprint has only the purple on the cover. Issue #3 was a complete redesign and bears the words "Revised Edition" on the cover.

Tattoo Samy appeared in PFIQ #18 (1983) and #19 as the magazine's first documented tongue piercing.

PFIQ contained a wide variety of material, mostly about body piercing, but occasionally about other forms of body art and body modification. A long series of articles by Jim Ward, "Pierce with a Pro," gave detailed information on how to perform many different piercings. Gauntlet also produced three "how-to" videos under the same title. Part 1 on male piercings appeared in 1988; part 2 covering female and unisex piercings was issued in 1994; part 3, an update of the first video came out in 1996.

The magazine contents also included interviews, accounts of piercings, letters from readers, book and video reviews, photographs, artwork, and fiction. PFIQ also contained advertising from a few businesses in closely related fields. Subscribers also received Pin Pals, a sheet of classified ads created to enable people with body piercings to meet each other.

== Reception ==
PFIQ was a controversial publication, due to its graphic portrayal of nudity and the piercing process. In some countries it was considered obscene, and confiscated by postal customs officials. It ceased publication in 1997 when Jim Ward sold Gauntlet. (Gauntlet failed under its new owner and closed in 1998.)
