= Jim Ward (body piercer) =

American body piercer (born 1941)

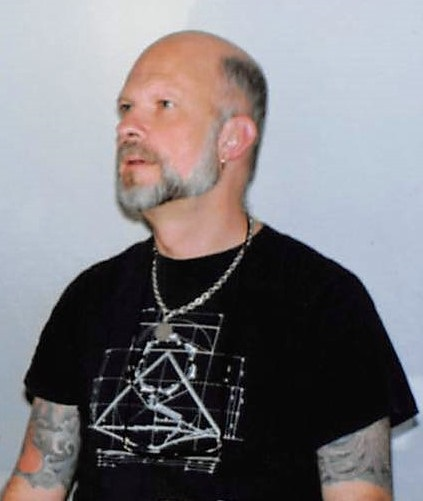
- Born: June 28, 1941 (age 85); Western Oklahoma, U.S.
- Occupation: Body piercer

James Mark Ward (born June 28, 1941) is an American body piercer. In a 2004 documentary, entitled The Social History of Piercing, MTV called him "the granddaddy of the modern body piercing movement."

== Early years ==
Ward was born in 1941 in Western Oklahoma and moved to Colorado when he was eleven. In 1967, in New York he joined the New York Motorbike Club, a gay S&M group, and experimented with nipple piercing. During this time he also studied jewelry making. Ward then moved to Colorado, where he joined the gay Rocky Mountaineer Motorcycle Club and further experimented with piercing, genital in particular. In 1973, Ward moved to West Hollywood (a gay village of Los Angeles) where he met Doug Malloy. Together they developed the basic techniques and equipment that have become piercing industry standard.

== Innovations ==
Ward pioneered many jewelry designs including the fixed bead ring and internally threaded barbells. He was introduced to barbell style jewelry by Horst Streckenbach ("Tattoo Samy"), a tattooist and piercer from Frankfurt, Germany, and his student Manfred "Tattoo" Kohrs from Hanover, Germany.

Ward stated, "The first barbells I recall came from Germany. Doug had made contact with Tattoo Samy, a tattooist and piercer from Frankfurt. Over the years Samy came to the States a number of times and frequently showed up in LA to visit Doug. On one of his first visits he showed us the barbell studs that he used in some piercings. They were internally threaded, a feature that made so much sense that I immediately set out to recreate them for my own customers."

With funding from Malloy (derived from his work with the Muzak corporation), Ward began using his home as a private piercing studio in 1975. Dubbing his studio the Gauntlet, he drew an initial clientele from a mailing list provided by Doug and by running classified ads in local gay and fetish publications. After three years of continued refinement with techniques and equipment, Ward opened the Gauntlet as a commercial storefront operation in West Hollywood on 17 November 1978. The establishment of this business — considered the first of its type in the United States — was the beginning of the body piercing industry.

In 1977, with the assistance of Malloy and Fakir Musafar, Ward started the piercing magazine Piercing Fans International Quarterly (PFIQ).

== Honors ==
In 2020, he was inducted into the Leather Hall of Fame.

He is an inductee of the Society of Janus Hall of Fame.
