= 2022 New Year Honours =

British royal recognitions

The 2022 New Year Honours comprised appointments by several of the 15 Commonwealth realms to various orders and honours in recognition of outstanding contributions and public service by their citizens. Announced on 31 December 2021, the honours formed part of the annual New Year celebrations, marking the beginning of January.

These honours were the final New Year appointments issued by Queen Elizabeth II. The Queen died nine months later, on 8 September 2022, at Balmoral Castle in Scotland, following the celebration of her Platinum Jubilee in June 2022, which marked the 70th year of her reign.

Recipients are listed according to the style they held prior to receiving their new honour. The list is arranged by the advising country, followed by the specific order or honour and its grade (such as Knight/Dame Grand Cross, Knight/Dame Commander, etc.), and then by division, including Civil, Diplomatic, and Military, where applicable.

== United Kingdom ==
Below are the individuals appointed by Elizabeth II in her right as Queen of the United Kingdom with honours within her own gift and with the advice of the government for other honours.

=== The Most Noble Order of the Garter ===
==== Royal Lady of the Most Noble Order of the Garter (LG) ====
- The Duchess of Cornwall, GCVO

==== Knight Companion / Lady Companion of the Most Noble Order of the Garter (KG / LG) ====
- The Right Honourable The Baroness Amos, CH
- The Right Honourable Anthony Charles Lynton Blair

=== The Order of the Companions of Honour ===
==== Member of the Order of the Companions of Honour (CH) ====
- Frank Ernest Field, Lord Field of Birkenhead, DL. For public and political service.
- Sir Paul Maxime Nurse. For services to Science and Medicine in the UK and Abroad.

=== Knight Bachelor ===
- Dr. Francis Atherton, Chief Medical Officer, Welsh Government. For services to public Health.
- The Right Honourable John Dominic Battle. For political and public service.
- John Boorman, CBE, Film Director. For services to film.
- Jan Petrus du Plessis, Executive Chairman, BT Group. For services to telecommunications and business.
- Professor Anthony Finkelstein, CBE, Lately Chief Scientific Adviser, National Security. For public service.
- The Right Honourable Robert Goodwill, MP, Member of Parliament for Scarborough and Whitby. For political and public service.
- Professor Robin William Grimes, FRS, FREng, Lately Chief Scientific Adviser, Ministry of Defence Nuclear. For services to UK resilience and international science relationships.
- David Winton Harding. For services to philanthropy.
- Professor John Anthony Hardy, FRS, Chair of the Molecular Biology of Neurological Disease, University College London. For services to human health in improving understanding of dementia and neurodegenerative diseases.
- Jason Francis Kenny, CBE. For services to cycling.
- Ian Livingstone, CBE. For services to the online gaming industry.
- Peter Edward Murray, CBE, Founding and executive director, Yorkshire Sculpture Park. For services to the Arts.
- Professor Jonathan Stafford Nguyen-Van-Tam, MBE, Deputy Chief Medical Officer. For services to public health.
- Dr. Douglas Edwin Oakervee, FrEng, CBE, chair, Independent Review of HS2. For services to transport and infrastructure delivery.
- Horace Shango Ové, CBE, Film Maker and Photographer. For services to media.
- Mark Trevor Phillips, OBE. For services to equality and human rights.
- Professor Shakeel Ahmed Qureshi, Professor of Paediatric Cardiology, Guy's and St Thomas' Hospitals Foundation Trust. For services to paediatric cardiology and charity.
- The Right Honourable Peter John Robert Riddell, CBE, Lately Commissioner for public Appointments. For public service.
- William Anthony Bowater Russell, Lately Lord Mayor of London. For services to financial innovation, culture, and wellbeing in the City of London particularly during the COVID-19 pandemic.
- Professor Gregor Ian Smith, Chief Medical Officer, Scottish Government. For services to public health.
- Alistair Spalding, CBE, artistic director and Chief Executive, Sadler's Wells Theatre. For services to dance.
- William David Wiggin, MP, Member of Parliament for North Herefordshire. For political and public service.
- Dr. Nigel David Wilson, Chief Executive, Legal & General. For services to the finance industry and regional development.

=== The Most Honourable Order of the Bath ===
==== Knight / Dame Commander of the Order of the Bath (KCB / DCB) ====
Military

- Air Marshal Gerry Mayhew, CBE

Civil

- Sir Patrick John Thompson Vallance, Government Chief Scientific Adviser, Government Office for Science. For services to Science in Government.
- Professor Christopher John MacRae Whitty, CB, Chief Medical Officer for England. For services to public Health.

==== Companion of the Order of the Bath (CB) ====
Military

- Rear Admiral Hugh Dominic Beard
- Major General Jonathan James Cole, OBE
- Major General Timothy David Hyams, OBE
- Lieutenant General Stuart Richard Skeates, CBE
- Air Vice-Marshal Clare Samantha Walton

Civil

- Ruth Bailey, Lately Director of Human Resources, Department for Levelling Up, Housing and Communities. For services to Human Resources.
- Adrian Philip Bird, Director General, Foreign, Commonwealth and Development Office. For services to British foreign policy
- Gareth Neil Davies, Director General, Aviation, Maritime, International and Security Group, Department for Transport. For public service.
- Elizabeth Jean Ditchburn, Director General, Economy, Scottish Government. For services to the Scottish Economy.
- Catherine Megan Frances, Director General, Local Government and public services, Department for Levelling Up, Housing and Communities. For services to Local Government.
- Brian Mark Hutton, Lately Clerk of the Journals, House of Commons. For services to Parliament.
- John-Paul Marks, Director General, Work and Health, Department for Work and Pensions. For services to Welfare Reform.
- Madelaine McTernan, Director General, Vaccine Taskforce. For services to the COVID-19 Response.
- Richard James Pengelley, Chief Executive, Northern Ireland Health and Social Care service and Permanent Secretary, Department of Health Northern Ireland. For services to Health and to the Government.
- Joanna Susan Rowland. Director General, HM Revenue & Customs. For services to the Economy during COVID-19.
- Elizabeth Jane Russell, Director General, Tax and Welfare, HM Treasury. For services to the Economy during COVID-19.

=== The Most Distinguished Order of Saint Michael and Saint George ===
==== Knight / Dame Commander of the Order of St Michael and St George (KCMG / DCMG) ====
- Professor Stewart Thomas Cole, Director-General, Pasteur Institute, Paris, France. For services to Science
- Alden McLaughlin, MBE, Former Premier, Cayman Islands. For services to the people of the Cayman Islands
- Menna Frances Rawlings, CMG, HM Ambassador Paris, France. For services to British foreign policy

==== Companion of the Order of St Michael and St George (CMG) ====
- William Borry, Director, Foreign, Commonwealth and Development Office. For services to British foreign policy and National Security
- Daniel Patrick Brendon Chugg, former HM Ambassador Yangon, Myanmar. For services to British foreign policy
- Daniel Craig, Actor. For services to Film and Theatre
- Samantha Louise Job, MVO, Director, Defence and International Security, Foreign, Commonwealth and Development Office. For services to British foreign policy
- Vivien Frances Life, Director and Chief Negotiator, Department for International Trade. For services to Trade and Investment
- Dr. Roderick Mackenzie, Chief Development Officer and Executive Vice President, Global Product Development, Pfizer. For services to public Health during COVID-19
- Sean Marett, Chief Business and Commercial Officer, BioNtech. For services to the development of a COVID-19 vaccine
- Benjamin Robert Merrick, lately Director, Overseas Territories Directorate, Foreign, Commonwealth and Development Office. For services to British foreign policy
- Melanie Angela Robinson, HM Ambassador Harare, Zimbabwe. For services to foreign and international development policy

=== The Royal Victorian Order ===
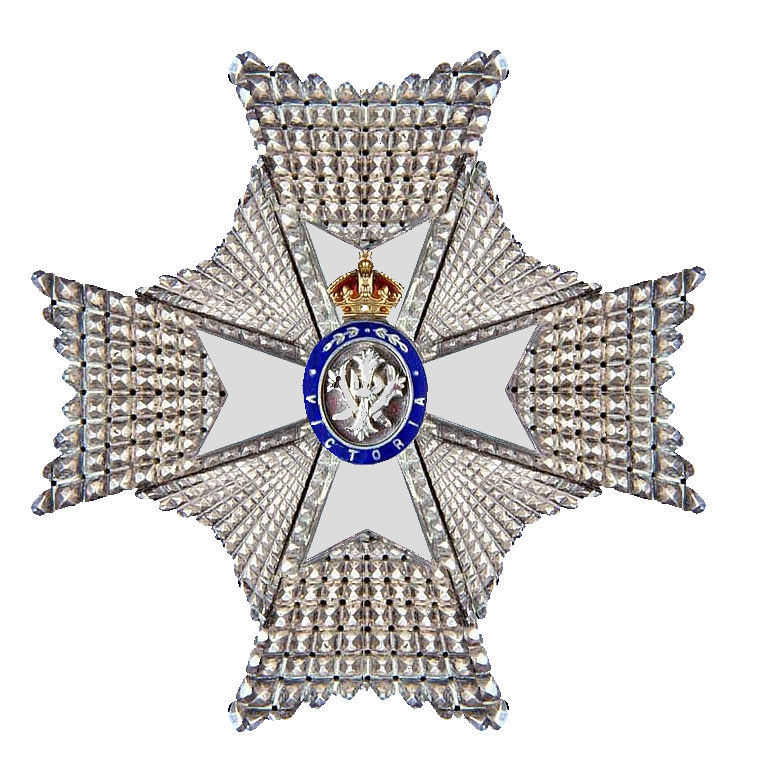
Insignia of a Knight / Dame Commander of the Royal Victorian Order

==== Commander of the Royal Victorian Order (CVO) ====
- Peter James Chenery. Chief Executive Officer, The Royal Anniversary Trust.
- Amanda Madeleine MacManus, LVO, lately Private Secretary to The Duchess of Cornwall.
- Caroline Anne Nunneley, LVO, Lady in Waiting to The Princess Royal.
- The Right Honourable Dame Patricia Lee Reddy, GNZM, QSO, lately Governor-General of New Zealand.
- Michael John Taylor, LVO, Deputy Master of the Household (Operations), Royal Household.
- Richard James Tilbrook, Clerk of the Privy Council and Prime Minister's Secretary for Appointments.
- Susan Margaret Winfield, OBE, Lord-Lieutenant of Tyne and Wear.

==== Lieutenant of the Royal Victorian Order (LVO) ====
- Mark Paul Flanagan, MVO, Assistant to the Master of the Household (Catering) and Royal Chef, Royal Household.
- Air Commodore Malcolm John Fuller, Gentleman Usher to The Queen.
- Lieutenant Colonel John Robert Dennis Kaye, DL, lately Lieutenant, Her Majesty's Body Guard of the Honourable Corps of Gentlemen at Arms.

==== Member of the Royal Victorian Order (MVO) ====
- Claire Louise Anderson, Assistant Retail and Admissions Manager, Palace of Holyroodhouse.
- Yasin Bharucha, Financial Accountant, Privy Purse & Treasurer's Office, Royal Household.
- Robert Patrick Biggs, Deputy Clerk to the Lieutenancy of Northumberland.
- Simon Michael Broughton, Inspector, Metropolitan Police service. For services to Royalty and Specialist Protection.
- Paul Carter, Collections Information Data Manager, Royal Collection, Royal Household.
- Lorraine Leslie Dale, Head Housekeeper, Master of the Household's Department, Royal Household.
- Mark Joseph Evans, Estate Manager, Government House, Perth, Australia.
- David William Geddes, President, The Braemar Royal Highland Society.
- Group Captain David Scott Glasson, Honorary Military Secretary to the Governor of New South Wales, Australia.
- Gwen Jackalin Hamilton, Superintendent and Head of Visitor Operations, Palace of Holyroodhouse.
- Lucinda Caroline Harby (Lucinda Hoysted), Personal Assistant to the Secretary, Duchy of Cornwall.
- Andrea Elizabeth Hudson, RVM. For services to the Royal Household.
- David Graham Langdown, Sergeant, Metropolitan Police service. For services to Royalty and Specialist Protection.
- Mathew Alan Palser, Palace Steward, Master of the Household's Department, Royal Household.
- Julian James Richard Payne, lately Communications Secretary to the Household of The Prince of Wales and The Duchess of Cornwall.
- David Turner, Chief Clerk, Lord Chamberlain's Office, Royal Household.
- Denise Mary Ann Vianna, executive assistant to the Director of the Royal Collection, Royal Household.
- Michael Desmond Watt, Deputy Lieutenant and Clerk to the Lieutenancy of County Down.

=== Royal Victorian Medal (RVM) ===
==== Bar to the Royal Victorian Medal (Silver) ====
- Anthony David Chambers, RVM, Plumber, Crown Estate, Windsor.
- Ian Charles Watmore, RVM, Gamekeeper, Crown Estate, Windsor.

==== Royal Victorian Medal (Silver) ====
- Anthony David Chambers, RVM, Plumber, Crown Estate, Windsor.
- Ian Charles Watmore, RVM, Gamekeeper, Crown Estate, Windsor.
- James Baxter, Estate Worker, Crown Estate, Windsor.
- Stephen Edwin Duquemin, General Catering Assistant (Stores), Master of the Household's Department, Royal Household.
- Jerome Gregory Finnis, lately Gentleman in Ordinary, Chapel Royal, St James's Palace.
- Pascal Florian Geeler, Chef, Household of The Prince of Wales and The Duchess of Cornwall.
- Andrew Henry Grocock, lately Aircraft Handler. For services to Royal Travel.
- Andrew Robert Hampstead, Horticulturalist, Crown Estate, Windsor.
- Karen Ann Oram, Glasshouse Gardener, Royal Gardens, Windsor.
- Trevor John Pope, Gardener, Government House, Perth, Western Australia.
- Stuart Robertson, Palace Attendant, Palace of Holyroodhouse.
- William Graham Taylor, Carpenter, Sandringham Estate.

=== The Most Excellent Order of the British Empire ===
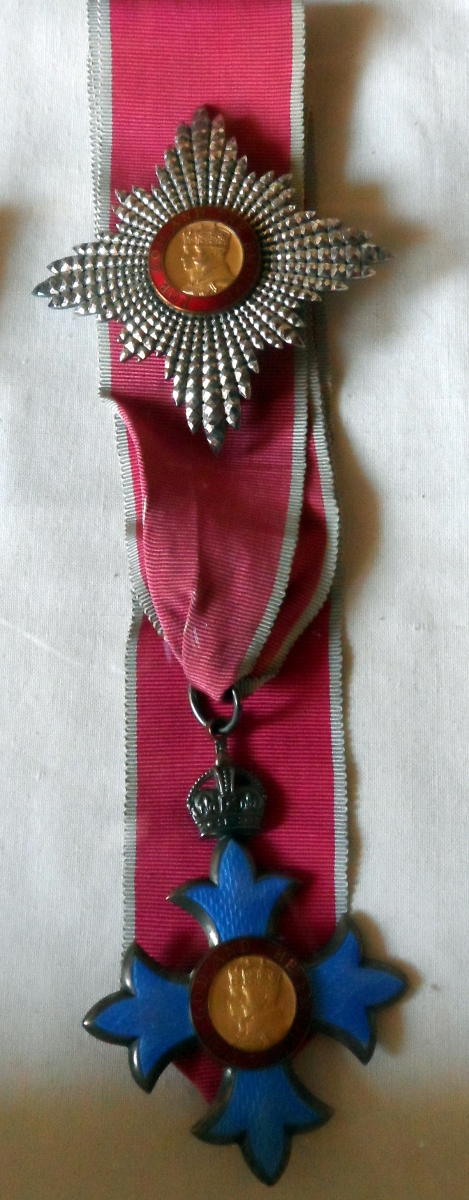
Insignia of a Knight Commander of the Order of the British Empire

==== Knight / Dame Commander of the Order of the British Empire (KBE / DBE) ====
Military

- Vice Admiral Christopher Reginald Summers Gardner, CBE
- Air Marshal Susan Catherine Gray, CB, OBE

Civil

- Dr. Vivienne Cox, CBE, Independent Non-Executive Director and Workforce Engagement Director, GSK and chair, Rosalind Franklin Institute. For services to sustainability, and to diversity and inclusion in business.
- Flora Jane Duffy, OBE, Triathlete. For services to sport in Bermuda.
- Dr. Jennifer Margaret Harries, OBE, Chief Executive, UK Health Security Agency. For services to health.
- Sylvia Lloyd Heal. For political and public service.
- Laura Rebecca Kenny, CBE. For services to cycling.
- Sara Khan, Lately Lead Commissioner, Commission for Countering Extremism. For services to Human Rights and Counter Extremism.
- Emily Lawson, Lately Chief Commercial Officer, NHS England and NHS Improvement. For services to the NHS, particularly during COVID-19.
- Diane Elizabeth Lees, CBE, Director General, Imperial War Museum. For services to museums and cultural heritage.
- Joanna Lumley, OBE. For services to drama, to entertainment and to charitable causes.
- Professor Julie Elspeth Lydon, OBE, Lately Vice-Chancellor, University of South Wales. For services to Higher Education.
- Dr. June Munro Raine, CBE, Chief Executive, Medicines and Healthcare products Regulatory Agency. For services to healthcare and the COVID-19 Response.
- Vanessa Redgrave, CBE, Actress. For services to Drama
- Professor Sarah Marcella Springman, CBE, Rector and Professor of Geotechnical Engineering, ETH Zurich. For services to Engineering and to International Sports Administration.
- Professor Helen Jayne Stokes-Lampard, chair, Academy of Medical Royal Colleges and chair, National Academy of Social Prescribing. For services to general practice.
- The Right Honourable Professor The Lord Kakkar. For services to healthcare and public service.
- The Right Honourable The Lord McAvoy. For political and public services.

==== Commander of the Order of the British Empire (CBE) ====
Military

- Captain Mark Edgar John Anderson
- Brigadier Daniel James Edward Cheesman, MBE
- Surgeon Commodore Stuart Mark Collett
- Major General Christopher Brendan Kevin Barry, OBE
- Major General Simon Howe Brooks-Ward, CVO, OBE, TD, VR
- Colonel Craig Ian Hanson
- Brigadier Robin Ronald Edward Lindsay
- Colonel Alan Mistlin
- Group Captain Jonathan Blythe Crawford, OBE
- Group Captain Gavin Paul Hellard

Civil

- Adesola Olumide Adetosoye, OBE, Chief Executive, Bromley Council. For services to children's welfare.
- Charles Edward Alexander, chair, Opera Rara, chair of the board, Royal Marsden NHS Foundation Trust and lately Lead Non-Executive Board Member, Department for Digital, Culture, Media and Sport. For voluntary and charitable services to the arts, to culture and to health.
- Timothy Edward Douglas Allan. For services to ausiness, charity and the arts.
- Professor Myles Robert Allen, Professor of Geosystem Science, University of Oxford. For services to Climate Change Attribution and Prediction and Net-Zero.
- Edmund John Seward Anderson, chairman and Independent Non-Executive Director, National Savings and Investments. For services to the Financial Sector and public Life in Yorkshire.
- Professor Jonathan Richard Benger, Chief Medical Officer, NHS Digital. For services to the NHS.
- Professor Phillip Thomas Blythe, Chief Scientific Adviser, Department for Transport. For services to Science and Engineering in Transport and Government.
- Sandra May Bowker (Sandra Wallace), Co-chair, Social Mobility Commission. For services to Law, Professional services and Social Mobility.
- Barbara Dana Broccoli, OBE, Film Producer. For services to Film, to Drama, to Philanthropy and to Skills.
- Jonathan Broomfield, Director, Department for Environment, Food and Rural Affairs. For public service.
- Linda Brown, chief executive officer, Criminal Injuries Compensation Authority. For services to Justice and the Victims of Crime.
- Lisa Jane Burger, executive director and Joint Chief Executive, National Theatre. For services to the Arts.
- Roger Burnley, Chief Executive, Asda Stores Ltd. For services to the Food Supply Chain.
- Kirsty Johnstone Bushell, National Vice Chairman SSAFA. For voluntary service to the Armed Forces.
- Dr. Elizabeth Kelly Cameron, OBE, Director and Chief Executive, Scottish Chambers of Commerce. For services to the Promotion of Scotland and UK International Trade.
- Julia Charles (Julie Jaye Charles). For services to Equality, to Intersectionality and to People with Disabilities
- Martin John Coles, Chief Executive, Marine Society and Sea Cadets. For services to Young People and Maritime Education.
- Jenny Coles, Director of Children's services, Hertfordshire County Council. For services to Children's Social Care.
- Steven Martin Cooper, Co-chair, Social Mobility Commission. For services to Banking and Social Mobility.
- Andrew Peter Cosslett, Lately Chairman, Rugby Football Union. For services to the Rugby Football Union.
- Leora Anne Cruddas, Chief Executive, Confederation of School Trusts, London. For services to Education.
- Jody Alan Cundy, OBE. For services to Cycling.
- John Andrew Dawson, chief executive officer, Oxford BioMedica. For services to UK Life Science.
- Countess Sally Jean De la Bedoyere, Lately Chief Executive Officer, Blue Cross. For services to Animal Welfare.
- John Stephen Denholm, chairman, J & J Denholm Ltd. For services to the Maritime Sector and Charities.
- Esmeralda Devlin, OBE. For services to Design.
- Professor James Diggle, emeritus professor of Greek and Latin, University of Cambridge. For services to Classical Scholarship.
- Alison Jane Duckles. Head, Learning and Development, Laing O'Rourke. For services to Education.
- Rebecca Ann Ellis, Director, Northern Ireland and Ireland, Cabinet Office. For public service.
- Martin MacLean Fairbairn, Lately Chief Operating Officer, Scottish Funding Council. For services to Education.
- Professor Kevin Andrew Fenton, Regional Director, Office for Health Improvement and Disparities, Department for Health and Social Care, and Regional Director, public Health, NHS London. For services to public Health.
- Dr. John Anthony Fingleton, Founder and chief executive officer, Fingleton Ltd. For services to the Economy and to Innovation.
- Professor Wendy Sue Fox (Wendy Barclay), Action Medical Research Chair Virology, Imperial College London. For services to Virology.
- Professor Lynne Elizabeth Frostick, board member, Environment Agency. For services to Flood Risk and Coastal Erosion Management.
- Professor Graham Harold Galbraith, Vice-Chancellor University of Portsmouth. For services to Higher Education.
- Dr. Steven John Gamblin, FRS, Director of Scientific Platforms, The Francis Crick Institute. For services to Scientific Research.
- John Gilhooly, OBE, Artistic and executive director, Wigmore Hall. For services to Music.
- Daniel Paul Greaves, Crime Director, Home Office. For services to Law and Order.
- Paul Greengrass, Film Director. For services to the Arts.
- Kathleen Grussing, managing director, Sapphire Partners Executive Search. For services to Business.
- Albert Lawrence Heaney, Chief Social Care Officer for Wales. For services to Social Care.
- Russell Keith Hobby, Lately General Secretary, National Association of Head Teachers, West Sussex. For services to Education.
- Anthony John Horowitz, OBE, novelist. For services to Literature.
- Professor Nicola Jane Horsley (Nicola Spence), deputy director, Plant and Bee Health and Chief Plant Health Officer, Department for Environment, Food & Rural Affairs. For services to Plant Health.
- Tanweer Ikram, Deputy Senior District Judge, Magistrates' Court. For services to Judicial Diversity.
- Alistair James Bradbury Jarvis, Chief Executive, Universities UK. For services to Higher Education, particularly during COVID-19.
- John Johnston, Deputy Secretary, Healthcare Policy Group, Department of Health. For services to Healthcare in Northern Ireland.
- Robert Jones, Director, Threat Leadership, National Crime Agency. For services to Prevention of Serious and Organised Crime.
- Professor Louise Clare Kenny, Pro Vice-Chancellor Health and Life Sciences, University of Liverpool. For services to Research in the NHS.
- David Arnold Kerfoot, MBE, DL, Lately Chair, York, North Yorkshire Local Enterprise Partnership. For services to Rural Businesses and the Voluntary and Community Sector.
- Shalini Khemka. For services to Entrepreneurship and to the Economy.
- Professor Kamlesh Khunti, Professor of Primary Care Diabetes and Vascular Medicine, University of Leicester and General Practitioner, Hockley Farm Medical Practice, Leicester. For services to Health.
- Louise Anne Kingham, OBE, Lately Chief Executive, Energy Institute. For services to the Energy Industry.
- Professor Martin Richard John Knapp, Director, NIHR School for Social Care Research and Professor, Health and Social Care Policy, London School of Economics. For services to Social Care Research.
- Dr. Kai Hung Lee, Founder, The Lee Kai Hung Foundation. For services to Education and Cultural Exchange between the UK and China
- Professor Nicholas Robert Lemoine, National Medical Director, Clinical Research Network, National Institute for Health Research. For services to Clinical Research particularly during COVID-19.
- Martin Steven Lewis, OBE, Founder, MoneySavingExpert. For services to Broadcasting and Consumer Rights.
- Dr. David George Llewellyn, Lately Vice-Chancellor, Harper Adams University. For services to Higher Education, to the Agri-Food Chain and to Rural Industries.
- Mark Richard Lloyd, Chief Executive, Local Government Association. For services to Local Government and to Charity.
- Sir Laurence Henry Philip Magnus, Bt., chair, Historic England and Member, Culture Recovery Board. For services to Heritage particularly during COVID-19.
- Professor Anne Elizabeth Magurran, FRSE, Professor of Ecology and Evolution, Centre for Biological Diversity and the Scottish Oceans Institute, University of St Andrews. For services to Biodiversity.
- Professor Ravi Prakash Mahajan, Lately President, Royal College of Anaesthetists. For services to Anaesthesia.
- Andrew Leslie Marr, DL, chairman, Andrew Marr International Ltd. For services to the UK Fishing Industry.
- Katherine Lyndsay Mavor, Chief Executive, English Heritage Trust. For services to Heritage.
- Robert Chad McCracken, MBE, Performance Director, British Amateur Boxing Association. For services to Boxing.
- Anthea Elizabeth Joy McIntyre, Lately Member, European Parliament, West Midlands. For political and public service.
- Richard Henry Meddings, Lately Chairman, TSB Banks. For services to the Financial Sector.
- Dr. John Ruthven Mitchell, Principal Medical Officer, Scottish Government. For services to Improving Mental Health in Scotland.
- Professor Kathryn Mary Mitchell, DL, Vice Chancellor, University of Derby. For services to Higher Education.
- Leslie Montgomery. For services to the Water Industry, the Environment and Overseas Aid.
- Professor Tavi Murray, Professor of Glaciology, Swansea University. For services to Glaciology and Climate Change Research.
- Norman Loch Murray, FRSE, Lately Chairman, Scottish Ballet. For services to the Arts.
- Steven Geoffrey Murrells, chief executive officer, Co-op Group. For services to the Food Supply Chain.
- Professor Peter John Morland Openshaw, Professor of Experimental Medicine and Proconsul, Imperial College London. For services to Medicine and Immunology.
- Nicholas Robson Owen, Lately UK Chair, Deloitte LLP. For services to the Professional services Sector.
- Stephen Mackenzie Park, OBE, Performance Director, British Cycling. For services to Cycling.
- Professor Malcolm Colin Press, Vice-Chancellor, Manchester Metropolitan University. For services to Higher and Technical Education.
- Professor Mark Radford, Chief Nurse, Health Education England and Deputy Chief Nursing Officer, NHS England and NHS Improvement. For services to Nursing.
- David Thomas Raw, deputy director, HM Treasury. For services to the COVID-19 Response.
- Stephen Michael Reese, Solicitor and Partner, Clifford Chance LLP. For services to the COVID-19 Response.
- Benjamin Rimmington, Lately Co-director, Road Safety Standards and services, Department for Transport. For services to Transport during COVID-19.
- Michael Roy Roberts, Style Director, Vanity Fair Magazine. For services to Fashion.
- Claudia Roden, Cookery Author. For services to Literature.
- Francis Rogers, Chief Executive, Liverpool City Region Combined Authority and Director General, Merseytravel. For services to Local Government Reform in the Liverpool City Region.
- Philippa Claire Rouse, Director, Future Border and Immigration System, Home Office. For public service.
- Laura Manning Shoaf, Lately Managing Director, Transport for the West Midlands. For services to Economic Regeneration in the West Midlands.
- Susannah Kate Simon, Director, UK-EU Trade Partnership, EU Secretariat, Cabinet Office. For public service.
- Professor Iqbal Singh, OBE, chair, Centre of Excellence in Safety for Older People. For services to Equality and Inclusion in Healthcare.
- Rachel Susan Skinner, FREng, executive director, WSP. For services to Infrastructure.
- Graham Thomas Smith, For services to the Trade Union Movement and the Promotion of Fair Work in Scotland.
- Dr. Liane Margaret Smith, FREng, Founder and Director, Larkton Ltd. For service to Engineering and Materials Science.
- Timothy John Smith, chair, Trade and Agriculture Commission. For services to Agriculture, Food, and Drink Trade Policy.
- Dr. John Frederick Stageman, OBE, chairman, LifeArc. For services to the Translation of Medical Research.
- Robert Adrian Stringer, chairman, Sony Music Group and chief executive officer, Sony Music Entertainment. For services to UK creative industries, to social justice and to charity
- Moira Clare Ruby Stuart, OBE, Presenter and Broadcaster. For services to Media.
- Bernard John Taupin, Lyricist. For services to Music
- Professor Irene Mary Tracey, Professor of Anaesthetic Neuroscience and Warden of Merton College, University of Oxford. For services to Medical Research.
- Janine Lesley Tregelles, Chief Executive, Revitalise Respite Holidays and lately Chief Executive, Mencap. For services to People with Learning Disabilities.
- Thomas Peter Usborne, MBE, Founder and managing director, Usborne Publishing. For services to Literature.
- Professor Russell Mardon Viner, Professor in Adolescent Health, University College London. For services to Child and Adolescent Health, particularly during COVID-19.
- Adrian Charles Vinken, OBE, DL, chief executive officer, Theatre Royal Plymouth. For services to Theatre.
- Donna Ward Sanderson, Director, Poverty, Families and Disadvantage, Department for Work and Pensions. For public service.
- Susie Warran-Smith (Susan Jane Nelson), chair, Produced in Kent. For services to Small Businesses in the UK Food Industry.
- Professor Nick Anthony David John Webborn, OBE, chair, British Paralympic Association. For services to Sport and Sports Medicine.
- Elizabeth Jane Whittaker, Director of Knowledge, Analysis and Information, HM Revenue and Customs. For services to the COVID-19 Response.
- Michael Gregg Wilson, OBE. For services to Film, to Drama, to Philanthropy and to Skills.
- Dr. Neil Rhys Wooding, For services to Social Justice, to Equality and to the community in Wales.

==== Officer of the Order of the British Empire (OBE) ====
Military

- Colonel Richard Charles Morris, MBE
- Commander Katie Marie Muir
- Colonel Simon Milward Rogers
- Surgeon Commander Lisa Claire Stevens
- Commander Mark Walker
- Lieutenant Colonel Oliver James Michael Bartels, Royal Army Medical Corps
- Colonel James Nicholas Briers Birch
- Lieutenant Colonel David Royston John Calder, Corps of Royal Engineers
- Colonel Kirsten Julie Dagless
- Lieutenant Colonel Timothy James Jonathan Draper, The Royal Regiment of Scotland
- Lieutenant Colonel David Anthony Goodacre, Army Air Corps
- Lieutenant Colonel James Robert Howard, Royal Tank Regiment
- Lieutenant Colonel Timothy Paul James, The Yorkshire Regiment
- Lieutenant Colonel Keith Edward Spiers, TD, VR, The Royal Anglian Regiment, Army Reserve
- Lieutenant Colonel Caroline Charlotte Vincent, Queen Alexandra's Royal Army Nursing Corps
- Acting Lieutenant Colonel Timothy Andrew Wight-Boycott, Royal Tank Regiment
- Group Captain Nicholas Charles Joseph Brittain
- Group Captain William Edward Dole
- Group Captain Shaun Gee
- Group Captain Richard David Grimshaw
- Wing Commander Dominic Francis Owen Holland
- Group Captain Sarah Catherine Moorehead
- Wing Commander Piers Lawrence Morrell

Civil

- Owen Abbott, Head, Census and Population Statistics Methodology, Office for National Statistics. For services to Census and Population Statistics.
- Syed Viqar Ahmed, Founder and chair, Community Energy London. For services to Community Energy, Decarbonisation and Community Benefit in London.
- Dr. Syed Ahmed, Clinical Director, Health Protection Scotland. For services to the COVID-19 Vaccination Programme.
- Amir Ali, Lately Chair, Civil Court Users Association. For services to Court Users and the Law.
- Dr. Aisha Nicole Andrewin, Chief Medical Officer, Anguilla. For services to public Health in Anguilla
- Andrew Edward Anson, chief executive officer, British Olympic Association. For services to Sport, particularly during COVID-19.
- Colonel (Rtd) Christopher Lee Argent, QVRM, TD, DL, chair, United Kingdom Reserve Forces' Association. For voluntary service to Reserve Forces in the UK and NATO.
- Lisa Armstrong, Fashion Director, The Telegraph. For services to Fashion.
- Professor Anthony John Avery, Professor of Primary Health Care, University of Nottingham. For services to General Practice.
- Mohammed Asif Aziz, Director, Healthcare services, Boots UK Ltd. For services to Pharmacy, especially Testing for COVID-19.
- Clark Samuel Bailie. For services to Housing and public Management in Northern Ireland.
- Yvonne Dawn Baker, Chief Executive, STEM Learning. For services to STEM Education.
- Natasha Louise Baker, MBE. For services to Equestrianism.
- Dr. Austin Howard Ball, Lately Technical Coordinator, Compact Muon Solenoid Experiment, CERN. For services to Physics and Engineering.
- Richard Edward Ballantyne, chief executive officer, British Ports Association. For services to the Maritime Sector.
- Elizabeth Barrett, Principal, Academy Transformation Trust for Further Education. For services to Education.
- Angela Barry, School Improvement Partner and Leadership Development Consultant. For services to Education.
- Thomas Bennett, Director and Founder, researchED, and Behaviour Adviser, Department for Education. For services to Education.
- Dr. David Bentley, vice-president and Chief Scientist, Illumina Cambridge Ltd. For services to Expertise and Leadership in Human Medical Genomics.
- Dr. Hindpal Singh Bhui, Inspection Team Leader, HM Inspectorate of Prisons. For services to Custody Facilities during COVID-19.
- Pauline Black, Singer, Actress and Author. For services to Entertainment.
- Sharon Blyfield, Head, Early Careers and Apprenticeships, Coca-Cola Europacific Partners. For services to Apprenticeships and Skills.
- Professor John Robert Fyfe Bolton, Lately Visiting professor, Institute of public Care, Oxford Brookes University. For services to Social Care.
- Julia Nonie Bouverat. For political service.
- Evelyn Jane Bowman, JP, Senior Complaints Manager, Ministerial Complaints Team, HM Revenue and Customs. For public service.
- Professor Veronica Elizabeth Bowman, Statistics and Data Science Fellow, Defence Science and Technology Laboratory. For services to Defence and the COVID-19 Response.
- Antony John Peter Bowring, Lately Secretary and Ship Organiser, Transglobe Expedition Trust. For services to Charity.
- Kathryn Emma Boyd, Lately Deputy Director, EU Secretariat, Cabinet Office. For public service.
- Alan Brace, Director of Finance, NHS Wales. For services to the NHS and the COVID-19 Response in Wales.
- Anthony Thomas Andrew Braddon, Philanthropist. For voluntary and charitable services to Homeless People and Underprivileged Children in London and the South East.
- Dr. Elizabeth Ann Breeze, Director, Centre for Philanthropy and Director, University of Kent. For services to Philanthropic Research and Fundraising.
- Amanda Bringans, Lately Director of Fundraising, British Heart Foundation. For services to Charity.
- Leslie William Brotherston, Theatrical Designer. For services to Dance and Theatre.
- Geoffrey Stewart Brown, Lately Chairman, St Johnstone Football Club. For services to Scottish Football and to the community in Perth.
- Kathryn Anne Brown, Lately Head of Climate Adaptation, Committee on Climate Change. For services to Climate Change Research.
- Joy Michelle Brown, Lately Senior District Crown Prosecutor, East of England, Crown Prosecution service. For services to Law and Order.
- June Muriel Brown, MBE. For services to Drama and to Charity.
- Henrietta Brown, Business Operations Lead, Office for National Statistics. For services to the Census of England and Wales.
- Peter William Burnett, Chair of the British Chamber of Commerce, Hong Kong. For services to the British Business Community in Hong Kong
- Alexander Mark Burns, chief executive officer, Robert Harter Ltd. For services to the UK Automotive Industry.
- Frank Butterfill, Head of Integrated services, Marshall Aerospace and Defence Group. For services to the Royal Air Force.
- Robin William Caley, Senior Lawyer, HM Revenue and Customs. For services to Tax and Pandemic Support.
- Dr. Ian William Campbell, Lately Interim Executive Chair, Innovate UK. For services to Innovation.
- Dr. Nira Cyril Chamberlain, President, Institute of Mathematics and its Applications. For services to Mathematical Sciences.
- Philippa Minshall Charles, Director, The Garfield Weston Foundation. For services to Arts, Culture and Community Recovery.
- Alpesh Chauhan, music director, Birmingham Opera Company. For services to the Arts.
- Gregory Stuart Childs, co-founder, Children's Media Conference and Director, Children's Media Foundation. For services to International Trade and to the Children's Media Sector.
- Jeanette Chippington, MBE. For services to Canoeing.
- Jaine Louise Chisholm Caunt, Director General, Grain and Feed Trade Association. For services to the Promotion of International Free Trade.
- Lorraine Anne Clarke, Regional Director and Executive Principal, ARK Schools Academy Trust, Hastings. For services to Education.
- Ann Cleeves, Author. For services to Reading and Libraries.
- Valerie Cockerell, Lately, Chief Officer, Official Seed Testing Station for Scotland, Science and Advice for Scottish Agriculture. For services to Scottish Agriculture.
- Hannah Lucy Cockroft, MBE, DL. For services to Athletics.
- Evelyn Margaret Cosgrove, Lately Principal, St Mary's High School, Newry. For services to Education.
- Kadeena Cox, MBE. For services to Athletics and Cycling.
- Professor Paul Croney, Vice-Chancellor and Chief Executive, Teesside University. For services to Higher Education and to Economic Regeneration.
- Reverend James Alan Cruddas, FRSA, deputy director, Department for Environment, Food and Rural Affairs. For public service.
- Dr. Mary Ann Cusack, Paediatrician, Love the One charity, India. For services to Healthcare and Child Welfare in India
- Thomas Robert Daley. For services to Diving, to LGBTQ+ Rights and Charity.
- Barclay John Davies. For services to public Transport and to the Government.
- Sharon Tracey Davies, Chief Executive, Hertfordshire Care Providers Association. For services to Social Care in Hertfordshire.
- Aled Siôn Davies, MBE. For services to Athletics.
- Professor Helen Davis, Head, Division of Ophthalmology and Orthoptics, Health Sciences School, University of Sheffield. For services to Orthoptics.
- Helene Dearn, West Midlands Group Director, Work and Health services, Department for Work and Pensions. For public service.
- David Deaves, Founder, Dewsbury Ambulance Charities. For voluntary and charitable services to the community in Wakefield, West Yorkshire.
- Sally Debonnaire, Director of Production, ITV. For services to Television and voluntary service to Skills through ScreenSkills.
- Madeleine Frances Desforges, chief executive officer, National Association for Voluntary and Community Action. For services to Volunteering and to Charity.
- Dr. Japinder Dhesi, Lately Team Leader, Cabinet Office. For public service.
- Davinder Singh Dhillon, chair, The Chattri Memorial Group. For services to the Commemoration of Indian Forces' Contribution in the First World War.
- Dr. Grainne Doran, General Practitioner, Northern Ireland and lately chair, Royal College of General Practitioners Northern Ireland Council. For services to General Practice.
- Martin Patrick Duffy, Lead Negotiator, Trade Agreements and Capability, Foreign, Commonwealth and Development Office. For services to Trade and Development
- Paul Durrant, Director, UK Games Talent and Finance CIC. For services to the Games Industry and Education.
- Carol Dutch, Scotland Employer, Partnership and Devolution Strategic Lead, Department for Work and Pensions. For services to Vulnerable people in Glasgow.
- Brenda Sophia Edmenson-McLeish, chief executive officer, The Learning Curve Group, For services to Further Education.
- Graham Winston Edwards, Chief Executive, Wales and West Utilities. For services to Business and to the Community in Wales.
- Dr. David Stuart Edwards, Lately Chair, Governing Body, Morley College London. For services to Adult and Further Education.
- Obumneke Ndudirim Ekeke. For services to Computing and Artificial Intelligence Education, and to Championing Diversity and Inclusion in the Technology Sector.
- Richard Etherington, Team Leader, Foreign, Commonwealth and Development Office. For services to British foreign policy
- Richard George Evans, MBE. For services to Charitable Fundraising particularly during COVID-19.
- Julia Elisabeth Frances Falconer, Senior Forest Policy Adviser, Foreign, Commonwealth and Development Office. For services to the Environment
- Mohammed Shabir Fazal, Headteacher, Eden Boys' Leadership Academy, Manchester. For services to Education.
- Jeremy Michael Dyer Field. For services to the Funeral Industry.
- Dr. Bethany Charlotte Firth, MBE. For services to Swimming.
- His Eminence Michael Fitzgerald, Cardinal, Roman Catholic Church. For services to Interfaith and Interchurch Partnerships.
- Deborah Mary Fleming, Chief Executive, University Hospitals Dorset NHS Foundation Trust. For services to the NHS.
- Julie Kim Anne Foley, Director, Flood Risk Management Strategy and National Adaptation, Environment Agency. For services to Managing Flood Risk.
- Professor John Leslie Robert Forsythe, medical director, Organ Donation and Transplantation, NHS Blood and Transplant. For services to Transplant Surgery and COVID-19.
- Mark James Fowles, Lately Managing Director, Nottingham Transport. For services to public Transport and to Charity.
- Martha Essandoah Freeman, Lately political Adviser and Head of Regional Office for the European Union Special Representative for the South Caucasus and the Crisis in Georgia. For services to Conflict Resolution in the South Caucasus
- Simon Edward French, Chief Inspector of the Rail Accident Investigation Branch. For services to Railway Safety.
- Raymond Francis Friel, Lately Chief Executive Officer, Plymouth CAST Trust. For services to Education.
- Nitin Ganatra, Actor. For services to Drama.
- Sajdah Perveen Ghafoor. For services to Cultural Awareness and Integration in Cumbria.
- Julian Mark Lythel Gibbs, Lately Head of Extradition, Home Office. For services to International Legal and Judicial Co-operation.
- Michael John Gifford, lately HM Ambassador, Nur-Sultan, Kazakhstan. For services to British foreign policy
- Nicholas Edward Giles, managing director of Consumer, Ordnance Survey. For services to the Health of the Nation.
- Jagtar Singh Gill. For services to the British Sikh and Interfaith Communities.
- Aonghus Coinn Huntly Gordon, Founding Trustee, Ruskin Mill Trust. For services to Cultural Heritage and Education.
- Professor Ailsa Jane Hall, Director of the Sea Mammal Research Unit, and Professor of Biology, University of St Andrews. For services to Environmental Protection and Epidemiology.
- Rebecca Ann Harris, deputy director, Foreign, Commonwealth and Development Office. For services to British foreign policy
- Deborah Harrison, Joint Managing Director, Pricecheck Toiletries Ltd. For services to International Trade.
- Robin Frances Hart, Senior Programme Director, Wilton Park. For services to British foreign policy
- Angela Maria Hartnett, MBE, Chef. For services to the Hospitality Industry and to the NHS during the COVID-19 Response.
- Lianne Hawkes, Team Leader, Ministry of Defence. For services to Defence.
- Oliver James Haydon, deputy director, HM Treasury. For services to European Negotiations.
- Daniel Hayes, Chief Executive, The Orders of St John Care Trust. For services to Social Care.
- Emma Carol Hayes, MBE, Manager, Chelsea Women. For services to Association Football.
- Susan Heath, Team Leader, Foreign, Commonwealth and Development Office. For services to British foreign policy
- Martyn John Henderson, Chief Executive, Sports Grounds Safety Authority. For services to Sports Safety during COVID-19.
- Dr. Clive Hickman, chief executive officer, The Manufacturing Technology Centre Ltd. For services to Engineering Manufacturing and Technology Development.
- Dr. Roger Ronald Highfield, Science Director, Science Museum Group. For services to public Engagement with Science.
- Patrick Godfrey Hungerford Holdich, Head of Research Analysts, Foreign, Commonwealth and Development Office. For services to British foreign policy
- Dr. Saleemul Huq, Director, International Centre for Climate Change and Development. For services to combatting International Climate Change
- Victoria Jane Hornby, chief executive officer, Mental Health Innovations. For services to the Charitable Sector during COVID-19.
- Sally Colette Hunt, Council Member, ACAS. For services to Industrial Relations.
- Raymond Hutchinson, managing director, Gilbert-Ash. For services to the Construction Industry and to Diversity and Inclusion.
- Pamela Susan Hutchinson. For services to Diversity and Inclusion in the Financial Sector.
- Robin Hutson. For services to the Hospitality Industry and Philanthropy.
- Dr. André Jan Imich, Special Educational Needs and Disabilities Professional Adviser, Department for Education. For services to Children and Young People.
- Deborah Mary Inskip, JP. For services to the community in Bedfordshire particularly during COVID-19.
- Dr. Melanie Jane Ivarsson, Senior Vice President, Chief Development Officer, Moderna, United States of America. For services to public Health during COVID-19
- Timothy Drysdale Jackson, Lately Principal, Sparsholt College and Andover College. For services to Further Education.
- James Jamieson, chairman, Local Government Association. For services to Local Government.
- Professor Ali Sadiq Mohammad Jawad, Professor of Rheumatology, Barts and the London School of Medicine and Consultant Rheumatologist, Barts Health NHS Trust. For services to Healthcare.
- Dr. Asyia Kazmi, Bill & Melinda Gates Foundation. For services to Education, particularly Girls' Education
- Paul Richard Peter Killworth, Team Leader, Foreign, Commonwealth and Development Office. For services to British foreign policy
- Felicity Jane Gordon Kirkwood, chair, British Hospital, Buenos Aires, Argentina. For services to the British Hospital Buenos Aires and to the British Community
- Sharath Kumar Jeevan, Lately Chief Executive Officer, STiR Education. For services to Education.
- David Hugh Johnston, Head, Digital Trust and Evidence Group. For services to Law Enforcement.
- Matthew Leon Jones, Executive Principal, ARK Globe Academy, London. For services to Education.
- Hanif Mohamed Kara, design director and co-founder, AKT II and Professor in Practice of Architectural Technology, Harvard Graduate School of Design. For services to Architecture, to Engineering and to Education.
- Zoe Elizabeth Keeton, Head, Regulatory Affairs UK and Ireland, RWE Renewables. For services to the Renewable Energy Sector.
- Millie Kendall, MBE, chief executive officer, British Beauty Council. For services to the Hair and Beauty Industry.
- Alison Kilbane-Griffiths, Corporate Customer Relationship Manager, Driver and Vehicle Licensing Agency. For services to Transport.
- Catherine Margaret Kitchen, chief executive officer, Skylark Partnership Academy Trust and chair, National Association of Hospital Education. For services to Children and Young People.
- John Andrew Kneen, HR Manager, Shell Energy, Shell Human Resources. For services to Diversity and Inclusion.
- Dr. David Konn, Mission Lead, Foreign, Commonwealth and Development Office. For services to British foreign policy
- Carol Lake, Member, Cultural Recovery Board. For services to the Arts during COVID-19.
- Dr. Alexander Geoffrey Lambert, deputy director, Covid Infection Survey Operations, Office for National Statistics. For services to Statistics and public Health.
- Matthew James Lanham, Chief Executive, Neuro Muscular Centre. For services to People Affected by Neuro Muscular Conditions in the UK.
- Clive Anthony Lawrence, Lately Executive Headteacher, St Giles' School, Derby. For services to Education.
- Neil Leitch, chief executive officer, Early Years Alliance. For services to Education.
- Dr. Katharine Liddell, Officer, National Crime Agency. For services to Law Enforcement and Ecology.
- Julie Lindsay, Chief Operating Officer, Office of the public Guardian. For services to Vulnerable People and the Community.
- Dr. Nigel Stuart Lockyer, Director, Fermi National Accelerator Laboratory. For services to Science and UK/US relations
- Andrew Ian Lovett, chair, Association of Independent Museums. For services to Cultural Heritage particularly during COVID-19.
- Professor Alan Lowdon, Professor in Practice, Durham University and Director, Strategic Development, National Offshore Wind Institute, Bristol Community College, Massachusetts, United States of America. For services to UK/US Offshore Wind Collaboration
- Alison Natalie Kay Lowe, Lately Chief Executive Officer, Touchstone. For services to Mental Health and Wellbeing during COVID-19.
- Amritpal Singh Maan, Philanthropist. For services to the Sikh Community and to Charity.
- Dr. Joanna Macrae, Co-Head, International Forests and Land Use, Department for Environment, Food and Rural Affairs. For services to the Environment.
- Drusilla Maizey, chair, NHS Business services Authority. For services to the NHS.
- Marie Alea Mary Greenwood Mallon, MBE, chair, Labour Relations Agency. For services to Industrial and Employment Relations in Northern Ireland, particularly during COVID-19.
- Christopher John Justin Manson, Interim Chief Executive, UK Government Investments. For services to Business and the Economy.
- Dr. Ruth Eleanor March, Senior Vice President, Precision Medicine and Biosamples, AstraZeneca. For services to UK Science and the COVID-19 response.
- William Marks, Senior Policy Liaison, Analysis and Civil Contingencies Secretariat Dashboard, Cabinet Office and Office of National Statistics. For public service.
- Helene Alexandra Marshall. For services to Maternity Education in Scotland.
- Ian James Marshall. For public and political service.
- Simon Peter Anthony Massarella, JP, National Digital Lead for the Magistracy. For services to the Administration of Justice.
- John Bickford De Vismes Martin St Valery, chair, Market Entry Solutions - JacksonMSV and chair, British Business Group of Dubai & Northern Emirates. For services to UK businesses in the United Arab Emirates
- Jeremy Paul Mayhew, Member, Court of Common Council and Lately Chairman, Finance Committee, City of London. For public and Voluntary service.
- James Douglas McAlpine, Deputy Development Director, British High Commission Dhaka, Bangladesh. For services to International Development
- Russell Warren McCallion, Group Human Resource Director, PD Ports. For services to Business and to the community in the Tees Valley.
- Sean McCarry, Regional Commander, Community Rescue service. For services to the community in Northern Ireland.
- David McCarthy, Team Leader, Ministry of Defence. For services to Defence.
- Dr. Catherine Isabel McClay, Lately Head of Futures, National Grid. For services to the Energy Sector and the Promotion of Decarbonisation.
- Catherine Lynne McClure, Director, Cambridge Mathematics. For services to Education.
- Horace Michael McEvoy, MBE. For services to the community in North Wales.
- Kevin Paul McGee, Joint Chief Executive, East Lancashire Hospitals NHS Trust and Blackpool Teaching Hospitals NHS Foundation Trust. For services to the NHS.
- Gavin Bruce McGillivray, development director, Official Development Assistance, British High Commission, New Delhi, India. For services to International Development
- Keith Andrew Meade, Assistant Head, Physical Security Policy, Ministry of Defence. For services to Defence and to Diversity.
- Professor Jonathan Michie, Professor, Innovation and Knowledge Exchange and President, Kellogg College, University of Oxford. For services to Education.
- Richard Harry Middleton, chair, Commonwealth Scholarship Commission. For services to the Commonwealth and to Higher Education
- Hannah Mills, MBE. For services to Sailing and the Environment.
- Professor Robert Minge Mokaya, Professor of Materials Chemistry and Pro-Vice-Chancellor for Global Engagement, University of Nottingham. For services to the Chemical Sciences,
- Donna Charlotte Molloy, Director, Policy and Practice, Early Intervention Foundation. For services to Vulnerable Children and Young People.
- Bridget Isabella Mongan, Director, Adult services and Prison Healthcare, South Eastern Health and Social Care Trust. For services to Prison Health Care and Social Work in Northern Ireland.
- Professor Hugh Edward Montgomery, Professor of Intensive Care Medicine, University College London. For services to Intensive Care Medicine and Climate Change.
- Lesley Moody, MBE, President, North East England Chamber of Commerce. For services to Business and to the community in North East England.
- Neil Moore, Leader, Vale of Glamorgan Council. For services to the community in the Vale of Glamorgan.
- Stephanie Susan Moore, MBE, Founder, The Bobby Moore Fund. For services to Bowel Cancer Research Funding.
- Dr. Catherine Lucy Morris, Paediatrician, Love the One charity, India. For services to Healthcare and Child Welfare in India
- Lynne Elizabeth Morris, JP, chief executive officer, The Toybox Charity. For services to Children in the UK and Abroad.
- Lieutenant Colonel Roderick Edmund Forbes Morriss, TD, DL, Representative Deputy Lieutenant, London Borough of Hackney. For public service.
- Kathryn Munson, Head, Probation services, Hull and East Riding, National Probation service. For services to the Criminal Justice System.
- Heather Catherine Murray, Senior Partnership Manager, Department for Work and Pensions. For services to Vulnerable People and Social Justice.
- Figen Ayse Murray, Campaigner and Educator. For services to Counter Terrorism.
- Amanda Naylor. For services to Vulnerable Children and Young People.
- David Peter Newton, Policy Manager, Energy, Consumers and Engagement, Department for Business, Energy and Industrial Strategy. For services to People Experiencing Fuel Poverty.
- David Laurence Nicholson, MBE, chair, Radio Tyneside. For services to Hospital Radio Broadcasting and to the community in Newcastle upon Tyne.
- Amanda Nicholson, chief executive officer, King's Academy Trust and Executive Principal, Oakwood Academy, Manchester. For services to Education.
- William John Oakes, Lately Headteacher, Dartford Grammar School, Kent. For services to Education.
- Jennifer Roselyn Ogole, chief executive officer, Bang Edutainment. For services to Young People.
- Melanie Oldham, Chief Executive, Bob's Business. For services to Business and Cybersecurity.
- Stephen Orr, Chief Executive, Catalyst. For services to Innovation.
- Steven George McNeil Osborne, Pianist. For services to Music.
- Isabelle Amanda Parasram, Barrister, England and Wales, chief executive officer, Social Value UK and lately Vice President, Liberal Democrats. For political and public service.
- Donald Parker, Lately Chief Executive Officer, Yorkshire Collaborative Academy Trust. For services to Education in North Yorkshire.
- Amanda Lin Parry, Deputy Chief Executive Officer, HISP MAT and executive director, LEARN Teaching School Alliance, Hampshire. For services to Education.
- Dr. Dipti Patel, Chief Medical Officer, Foreign Commonwealth and Development Office. For services to Government officials and their families and to British nationals overseas
- Professor Mahendra Gulabbhai Patel, Pharmacist. For services to Pharmacy.
- Rizwan Patel, Founder, Lint Group. For services to the Disadvantaged Communities in the UK and Abroad, particularly during COVID-19.
- Matthew Richard Patey, chief executive officer, British Skin Foundation and managing director, Skin Health Alliance. For services to Dermatological Research.
- Dan Pearson, Landscape Designer, Gardener and Horticulturalist. For services to Horticulture.
- Adam George Peaty, MBE. For services to Swimming.
- Mark William Pemberton, Director, Association of British Orchestras. For services to Music.
- David Leslie Peppiatt, Director, Humanitarian Cash Assistance, British Red Cross. For services to the Red Cross' International Humanitarian Programme.
- Ronald Phillips (Charlie Phillips), Photographer. For services to Photography and the Arts.
- Adam Rhodri Pile, deputy director, Head of Caribbean and Southern Oceans Department, Foreign, Commonwealth and Development Office. For services to the British Overseas Territories
- Stephen Piper, Team Leader, Ministry of Defence. For services to Defence.
- Vivienne Porritt, co-founder and Global Strategic Leader, WomensEd and co-founder, DisabilityEd UK. For services to Education.
- Antony Paul Porter, QPM, Lately Commissioner, Office of the Surveillance Camera Commissioner. For services to Security and to Human Rights.
- Professor Lauge Neiman Skovgaard Poulsen, Professor of International Relations and Law, University College London. For services to UK Trade Policy
- Arti Prashar, Artist, Director and Consultant. For charitable services to People Living with Dementia.
- Jonathan Rea, MBE. For services to Motorcycle Racing.
- Paul Robert Reddish, Chief Executive, Volunteering Matters and Chief Executive, ProjectScotland. For services to the Voluntary and Community Sector during COVID-19.
- Alastair James Reid, Probation National Security Lead, H.M. Prison and Probation service. For services to public Protection in England and Wales.
- Keith David Richards, chair, Disabled Persons Transport Advisory Committee. For services to Accessible Transport.
- William Patrick Roache, MBE. For services to Drama and Charity.
- Susan Robertson (Sue Mountstevens), Lately Police and Crime Commissioner, Avon and Somerset. For services to the community in Bristol, Somerset and South Gloucestershire.
- Michael William Robinson, chief executive officer, Prior's Court, Thatcham. For services to Children and Young People with Autism.
- Merwyn Foster Lyte Rogers, Permanent Secretary, Ministry of Health, Anguilla. For public service and services to public Health and Healthcare in Anguilla
- Dr. Russell David Rook, Founding Partner, Good Faith Partnership. For services to Social Action.
- Professor Pauline Margaret Rose, Professor of International Education and Director of Research for Equitable Access and Learning Centre, University of Cambridge. For services to International Girls' Education
- Hannah Russell, MBE. For services to Swimming.
- Thomas James Rutherford, Lately Head, Encryption and Online Safety, Home Office. For services to public Safety.
- Christopher Ryan, Head, Cash Desk, UK Debt Management Office. For public service.
- Charles Edward Sabine, Global Campaigner, Huntington's Disease. For Charitable and Voluntary services.
- Margaret Patricia Saxton, chair, North East Learning Trust and Apollo Schools Trust, Durham. For services to Education.
- Neil Robert Scotland, Senior Forestry Adviser, Foreign, Commonwealth and Development Office. For services to the Environment
- William John Graham Scott (John Scott), Lately Member, Scottish Parliament, Ayr. For political and public service.
- Mark Sealy, MBE, Curator and Cultural Historian. For services to Art.
- Jonathon Mark Sesnan, co-founder and chief executive officer, Greenwich Leisure Ltd. For services to the UK Leisure Industry, particularly during COVID-19.
- Imran Faisal Shafi. For public service.
- Rohini Sharma Joshi, Lately Equality, Diversity and Inclusion Manager, Trust Housing Association, Edinburgh. For services to Equality, Diversity and Inclusion.
- Fay Angela Sharpe, Founder, Fast Forward 15. For services to Mentoring Women, Gender Equality and to Charitable Fundraising.
- Michael John Sharrock, Chief Executive, British Paralympic Association. For services to Athletes with Disabilities.
- Professor Eleanor Shaw, Associate Principal Entrepreneurship and Education, University of Strathclyde. For services to Entrepreneurship and to Education.
- Professor Zoe Kai Shipton, Professor of Geological Engineering, University of Strathclyde. For services to Geoscience and Climate Change Mitigation.
- Hilary Ann Margaret Singleton, board member, International Fund for Ireland. For services to the Community Sector.
- Sindy Skeldon, deputy director, Universal Credit National services, Work and Health services, Department for Work and Pensions. For public service.
- David John Rivers Sleath, chief executive officer, SEGRO plc. For services to Charity and Business.
- Susan Louise Smith, Lately Director, Science and Technology Facilities Council's Accelerator Science and Technology Centre. For services to Science and Technology.
- Andrew Mark Smith, Director, Corporate Affairs, Pinewood Group Limited and chair, Buckinghamshire Local Enterprise Partnership. For services to Business and to the British Film Industry.
- Michael John Smith, Digital Media Manager, Metropolitan Police service. For services to Law Enforcement.
- Dr. Faye Catherine Smith, Materials Specialist, Department for International Trade and Independent Consultant. For public service.
- Louise Natalie Smith, deputy director, Arts and Libraries Team, Department for Digital, Culture, Media and Sport. For services to the Arts during COVID-19.
- Adrian Paul Smith, Chief Executive, Reclaim Fund Ltd. For services to Financial Sector.
- David John Smith, MBE. For services to the Sport of Boccia.
- Thomas Spedding, Transport Manager, Nuclear Transport Solutions. For services to the UK Nuclear and Transport Industries.
- Chris Spice, National Performance Director, British Swimming. For services to Swimming and High Performance Sport.
- Dr. Julian Francis Stair, Potter and Historian. For services to Ceramics.
- Scott William Stevenson, deputy director, COVID-19 Taskforce, Cabinet Office. For public service.
- Nicola Jane Steward, UK Deputy Permanent Representative to the Organisation for the Prohibition of Chemical Weapons, The Hague. For services to British foreign policy
- Erika Jane Stoddart, chair, TEC Partnership. For services to Education.
- Dr. Antony Stokes, LVO, HM Ambassador Havana, Cuba. For services to British foreign policy
- Dr. Malur Sudhanva, Consultant Virologist, South London Specialist Virology Centre, King's College Hospital, NHS Foundation Trust. For services to Healthcare Science particularly during COVID-19.
- Professor Ann Sutton, MBE. For services to the Arts.
- Kate Elizabeth Sutton (Katie Piper), Founder, The Katie Piper Foundation. For services to charity and Victims of Burns and other Disfigurement Injuries.
- Anthony David Swallow, Philanthropist and Joint Founder, Cre8 Macclesfield Youth and Community Programme. For services to Young People and to the community in Cheshire and Abroad.
- Dr. Kevin Francis Sweeney, Lately Head, Central Survey Unit, Northern Ireland Statistics and Research Agency. For public service, particularly during COVID-19.
- Julie Christina Bingham Taggart, Principal, Nendrum College, Comber, Northern Ireland. For services to Education.
- Selina Maureen Taylor, Deputy Chief Engineer, Submarine Combat Systems, Submarine Delivery Agency. For services to Defence and to St John Ambulance during COVID-19.
- Rekha Thawrani, Global Head, NEC Contracts, Thomas Telford Ltd. For services to Infrastructure and British Exports.
- Dr. Julia Elizabeth Thompson, Senior Director R&D, AstraZeneca. For services to the COVID-19 response.
- John Gerard Timpson, Disability and Access Ambassador. For voluntary services to People with Disabilities and to the Financial Sector.
- Sanjiv Vedi, assistant director, Head, Office of the Chief Social Care Officer for Wales. For public, Charitable and Voluntary service.
- Peter Vernon, International Liaison Officer, National Crime Agency. For services to International Law Enforcement.
- Professor Simon Wain-Hobson, Head, Molecular Retrovirology, Pasteur Institute, Paris, France. For services to Virology
- Dr. Stuart Wainwright, Director, Government Office for Science. For services to Contingency Planning and Response.
- Lady Rachel Elizabeth Waller, co-founder and lately Head of Fundraising, Charlie Waller Trust. For services to Mental Health in Young People.
- Janet Mary Wallsgrove, Director, H.M. Prison and Young Offender Institution Parc, G4S Care and Justice services Limited. For services to the Prison service.
- Sonia Walsh, Governor, H.M. Prison Wayland. For services to H.M. Prison and Probation service.
- John Selwyn Ward, Lately Deputy Director, Department for Work and Pensions Legal Advisers, Government Legal Department. For public service.
- Edward James Watson-O'Neill, chief executive officer, SignHealth. For services to People with Hearing Impairments.
- Claire Waxman, Independent Victims' Commissioner for London, Mayor's Office for Policing and Crime. For services to Victims of Crime.
- David Wells, chief executive officer, Logistics UK. For services to Transport and Logistics during COVID-19.
- Sophie Wells, MBE. For services to Equestrianism.
- Andrew David Whalley, Global Chairman, Grimshaw Architects. For services to Architecture and to Environmental sustainability
- David Robert Wheldon. For services to Advertising and Marketing.
- Sandra Jane White, Lately National Lead for Dental public Health, public Health England. For services to Dental public Health and COVID-19.
- Max Antony Whitlock, MBE. For services to Gymnastics.
- Katrina Joan Williams, Head, Office and Travel Solutions, Crown Commercial service. For public service.
- Dr. Douglas Andrew Wilson, Chief Scientist, Environment Agency. For services to Environmental Research and the COVID-19 Response.
- Peter Wilson. For services to Classical Ballet.
- Julius Peregrine Harold Shepherd Wolff-Ingham, Head of Marketing and Fundraising, The Salvation Army, UK and Republic of Ireland. For services to Charitable Fundraising.
- Derek Andrew Wood, Head, Retirement services Assurance, Department for Work and Pensions. For services to Pensioners.
- Heather Jean Wood, Registrar, House of Commons. For services to the House of Commons.
- Sarah Jane Wren, MBE, chief executive officer, Hertfordshire Independent Living service. For services to Older and Disabled People in Hertfordshire.

==== Member of the Order of the British Empire (MBE) ====
Military

- Lance Corporal Alexandre Pierre Cassabois
- Lieutenant Carlo Riccardo Contaldi, Royal Marines Reserve
- Chief Petty Officer Colette Natasha Green, Queen Alexandra's Royal Naval Nursing services
- Leading Logistician (Writer) Rebecca Anne Harrington
- Warrant Officer Class 1 Robert McAusland Henderson, MVO
- Lieutenant Commander Edward Higgins
- Warrant Officer Class 1 John McWilliams, Royal Marines Reserve
- Petty Officer Medical Assistant Jessica Metcalfe
- Lieutenant Commander Gordon Smith, Royal Naval Reserve
- Chief Petty Officer Logistician (Catering services) Robert Thompson
- Warrant Officer Class 2 Dominic Jason Bellman, Royal Regiment of Artillery
- Major Mark Eric Black, The King's Royal Hussars
- Lieutenant Colonel Bryon Harvey Brotherton, The Royal Scots Dragoon Guards
- Corporal Darren Iain Burmis, Intelligence Corps
- Lieutenant Colonel Lucinda Jane Butler, The Royal Logistic Corps
- Captain Oliver George Owen Carmichael, Scots Guards
- Acting Major James William Carrahar, VR, Adjutant General's Corps (Educational and Training services Branch), Army Reserve
- Acting Lieutenant Colonel Ross Alexander Carter, Corps of Royal Electrical and Mechanical Engineers
- Major James Richard Chacksfield, The Royal Regiment of Fusiliers
- Colour Sergeant Roger Anthony Maurice Coates, VR, Coldstream Guards, Army Reserve
- Lance Corporal Danielle Marie Collingridge-Moore, Intelligence Corps, Army Reserve
- Staff Sergeant Timothy Alan William Davies, Corps of Royal Electrical and Mechanical Engineers
- Major James Alexander Douglas, Adjutant General's Corps (Staff and Personnel Support Branch)
- Acting Lieutenant Colonel Gary Anthony Fitchett, Royal Army Medical Corps
- Warrant Officer Class 2 David Kingsley Gosney, Royal Regiment of Artillery
- Warrant Officer Class 1 Donald Edward Grant, The Royal Scots Dragoon Guards
- Captain Thomas James Hames, Intelligence Corps
- Staff Sergeant Nikky Stephen Hawke, Royal Army Veterinary Corps
- Major Martin Hayes, The Royal Logistic Corps
- Staff Sergeant Ty Jewell, Royal Army Medical Corps
- Major Daniel Anthony Jones, Royal Regiment of Artillery
- Lieutenant Colonel Callum Angus Mackay Lane, The Royal Regiment of Scotland
- Colour Sergeant Perrie Michael Leith, VR, The Royal Regiment of Scotland, Army Reserve
- Lieutenant Colonel Ruth Rosemary Littlejohns, VR, Adjutant General's Corps (Staff and Personnel Support Branch), Army Reserve
- Lieutenant Colonel Jonathan Stewart MacGill, Adjutant General's Corps (Royal Military Police), Army Reserve
- Lieutenant Colonel Andrew George Maund, Royal Army Medical Corps
- Acting Sergeant Roxanne Ellouise McKinnon, Intelligence Corps, Army Reserve
- Major Brandon Metherell, Intelligence Corps
- Major Taniya Elizabeth Sarah Morris, Army Air Corps, Army Reserve
- Warrant Officer Class 1 Adam Robert Phillpotts, Royal Corps of Signals
- Lieutenant Colonel Melanie Emma Prangnell, Army Cadet Force
- Warrant Officer Class 2 Martin Raymond Price, Corps of Royal Electrical and Mechanical Engineers
- Corporal Andrew Ronald Ritchie, Royal Army Medical Corps
- Acting Lieutenant Colonel Stefan Karol Siemieniuch, Corps of Royal Engineers
- Captain Timothy John Smalley, Corps of Royal Engineers, Army Reserve
- Major Angus Donald Steele, The Royal Regiment of Scotland
- Corporal Joseva Koroi Vakacokaivalu, The Ranger Regiment
- Warrant Officer Class 1 Lindsey John Ware, Royal Corps of Signals
- Lieutenant Colonel Liam Paul Wilson, The Royal Regiment of Fusiliers
- Flight Sergeant Carl Barker
- Chief Technician Lee Owen Betts
- Senior Aircraftwoman Shona Claire Brownlee
- Squadron Leader Mark Discombe, AFC
- Wing Commander Nathan Foster
- Master Aircrew James Fowler
- Squadron Leader Angela Hemlin
- Flight Lieutenant Steven Mathew Hewer
- Squadron Leader Katherine Alexandra Lee
- Flight Lieutenant Jonathan Patrick O'Rourke
- Corporal Christopher Stephen Rimmer
- Squadron Leader Tracey McDonnell Rowlands

Civil

- Marie Addison, Regional Community and Sustainability Manager, Northern Trains Ltd. For services to the community in Northumberland.
- Oyebanji Adeyemi Adewumi, lately associate director of Inclusion, Barts Health NHS Trust. For services to the NHS and to Diversity.
- Doreen Muriel Kinbarra Agutter. For services to the History of Meriden and Warwickshire.
- Abigail Adwoa Boatemaa Agyei, lately Senior Policy Advisor, People, Places and Communities, Department for Levelling Up, Housing and Communities. For public service.
- Zulkifl Ahmed, lately Special Educational Needs and Disability Group Manager, Worcestershire County Council. For services to Education and to Young People.
- Morenike Olubukunola Ajayi, Founder, Career Nuggets. For services to Race Equality and Inclusion.
- Jayne Elizabeth Aldridge, Director for the Student Experience, University of Sussex and lately chair, AMOSSHE. For services to Students in Higher Education.
- Dr. Rhoda Allison, associate director of Nursing and Professional Practice, Torbay and South Devon NHS Foundation Trust. For services to Physiotherapy.
- Karen Jane Almond. For services to Women's Rugby Union Football.
- Professor Diana Anderson, Professor of Biomedical Sciences, University of Bradford. For services to Genetic and Reproductive Toxicology.
- Freya Anderson. For services to Swimming.
- Graeme Anderson, lately Lead Events Planning Officer, Tayside Division, Police Scotland. For services to Event Planning and to Law and Order in Dundee.
- Samantha Kate Anderson, Senior Policy Adviser, Pensions and Savings Tax, H.M. Treasury. For public service.
- Dr. Wendy Jane Anne Anderson, Respiratory Consultant, Northern Health and Social Care Trust. For services to Healthcare, particularly during the COVID-19 Pandemic.
- John Linden Archibald, Hall Porter, Old College, Royal Military Academy Sandhurst. For services to Defence.
- Dr. Seema Safia Arif. For services to Health Care amongst the Black, Asian and Minority Ethnic Community.
- Roger Colin Armstrong. For services to Storytelling in Northern Ireland.
- Michael Frederick Asante, co-founder, Boy Blue. For services to Hip-Hop Dance and Music.
- Gregory Antonio Ashby, Director of Operations, Money A&E. For services to Disadvantaged People and Social Enterprise.
- Syima Aslam, co-founder, chief executive officer and artistic director, Bradford Literature Festival. For services to Literature.
- David Gwynne Backhouse, Chair of Governors, Grove Primary School, Mayfield High School, Barley Lane Primary School, and Redbridge Primary School, London Borough of Redbridge. For services to Education.
- Margaret Po Ling Bailey, Occupational Psychologist, Royal Air Force Recruitment and Selection. For services to Aircrew Assessment and Aptitude Testing.
- Matthew James Baker, Trustee, Children in Need. For charitable and voluntary services to Fundraising.
- Dr. Subramaniam Balachandran, Doctor and Lead, Cross Infection, Cardiff and Vale University Health Board. For services to the NHS during COVID-19.
- Ashley Banjo. For services to Dance.
- Darren Barker, Principal Conservation Officer, Great Yarmouth Borough Council and managing director, Great Yarmouth Preservation Trust. For services to Heritage.
- Juliette Barker, Business Readiness Lead, Leicester, HM Revenue & Customs. For public service.
- Dennis Morris Barnett. For services to Vulnerable People in Essex.
- Gareth John Batty, chief executive officer, FareShare, Yorkshire. For services to the Charity Sector.
- Laura Catherine Baxter. For services to the Special Olympics.
- Professor Laura Charlotte Bear, Professor and Head of the Department of Anthropology, London School of Economics. For services to Anthropology during COVID-19.
- Malcolm Ellis Bell, Chief Executive, Visit Cornwall. For services to Tourism in South West England, particularly during COVID-19.
- Gary Bennett, Patron, Show Racism The Red Card. For services to Anti-Racism in Football.
- Alan Richard Benson, chair, Transport for All. For services to public Transport for People with Disabilities.
- Sushma Bhanot. For services to Wellbeing and the community in Chigwell, Essex, particularly during COVID-19.
- Ayaz Mazeed Bhuta. For services to Wheelchair Rugby.
- Sharman Birtles, J.P., D.L. For services to Charity and the community in Greater Manchester.
- Stuart Bithell. For services to Sailing.
- Joe Blackman. For services to the Economy and Charity.
- Michelle Dawn Blanchard, lately Executive Principal, Dixons Academies Trust, Bradford. For services to Education.
- Matthew Philip Bolshaw, Member, Secretariat for the General Aviation, All-Party Parliamentary Group. For services to Aviation Safety.
- Antoine-Philippe Boo, First Secretary Migration and Borders, British Embassy Paris. For services to UK Border Security.
- Sarah Boyle, Team Leader, Ministry of Defence. For services to Defence.
- Anthony Ross Bradley. For services to the community in Newtown Linford and Birstall, Leicestershire.
- Jane Rosalind Bradshaw. For services to Charity in North-East England.
- Margaret Emma Bravo, Manager, St Peter's Pre-School, Carlisle. For services to Education.
- Dr. Peter Richard Briggs. For services to Judo.
- Frank Bright. For services to Holocaust Education.
- Ezechi David Michael Britton, co-founder and chief executive officer, Code Untapped. For services to Diversity and to Young People.
- Peter Broadbent, Director and Conductor, Joyful Company of Singers. For services to Music.
- Michael Tom Bromby, Boxing Coach. For services to Boxing and the community in Hull.
- Pawlet Brookes, Founder and artistic director, Serendipity Arts UK Ltd. For services to the Arts.
- Melanie Janine Brown, Patron, Women's Aid. For services to Charitable Causes and Vulnerable Women.
- Georgia Taylor-Brown. For services to Triathlon.
- Jonathan Brownlee. For services to Triathlon.
- Elizabeth Mary Buchanan, Ward Manager, Respiratory Ward, Altnagelvin Hospital. For services to Nursing in Northern Ireland, particularly during COVID-19.
- Jamie Daniel Peter Jones-Buchanan. For services to Rugby League Football and the community in Leeds.
- Dr. Robert Franklin Bud, Keeper Emeritus and Museologist, The Science Museum. For services to the Science Museum and Northern Industrial Heritage.
- Sofia Buncy, Founder, Muslim Women in Prison Project. For services to Prisoners and the community in Bradford, West Yorkshire.
- The Reverend Steven Leo Bunting. For charitable services to the community in Swansea.
- Robert James Burrows, lately Branch Staff Member, Nationwide. For services to the Financial Sector and to the community in Bath during COVID-19.
- Arjmund Jabeen Butt. For services to HM Revenue and Customs and the Black, Asian and Minority Ethnic Community.
- Ellen Frances Buttrick. For services to Rowing.
- John Frederick Leonard Caiger, Cadet Executive Officer, Essex Army Cadet Force. For services to Young People in Essex.
- Hilda Campbell, Chief Executive, COPE Scotland. For services to Mental Health and Wellbeing in the Community in Scotland during COVID-19.
- Professor Lucy Jane Carpenter, Professor of Atmospheric Chemistry, University of York. For services to Atmospheric Chemistry.
- Andrew Carwood, Founder Director, The Cardinall's Musick and Director of Music, St Paul's Cathedral. For services to Choral Music.
- Julian MacLeod Paul Cash, chair, Community Furniture Aid. For services to Homeless People in Bridgend.
- Wendy Casson, lately Head Teacher, Educational Diversity, Blackpool. For services to Education.
- Jordan Michael Catchpole. For services to Swimming.
- Louis Cayer, Tennis Coach. For services to Tennis.
- Rabbi Albert Sebastian Chait. For services to the Jewish Community and to Charity in West Yorkshire, particularly during COVID-19.
- Professor Iain Leslie Campbell Chapple, Professor, Periodontology and Head of Research, Institute of Clinical Sciences, College of Medical and Dental Sciences, University of Birmingham and Consultant, Restorative Dentistry, Birmingham Community Healthcare Foundation NHS Trust. For services to Oral and Dental Health.
- Brian Chenier, Support Officer, Prosthetics, Blesma. For services to Disabled Veterans.
- Jane Heather Chiondini, Travel Health Specialist Nurse. For services to Training and Development in Travel Medicine.
- Christine Rutherford Chisholm, Founder Trustee, New Jumbulance Travel Trust, Hampshire. For services to Philanthropy and to Charitable Causes.
- Joseph Choong. For services to Modern Pentathlon.
- Anita Choudhrie, Founder, Path to Success. For services to Disability Sports.
- Matthew John Clark, lately Chief of Staff, Scottish Liberal Democrats, Scottish Parliament. For services to Politics.
- Howard Morgan Clarke, Research Director, Morgan Innovation and Technology. For services to Business and Entrepreneurship.
- Susan Elizabeth Clarke, managing director, Morgan Innovation and Technology. For services to Business and Engineering.
- William John Clarke, Leader, Gedling Borough Council. For services to Local Government in Nottinghamshire.
- Peter Roland Henry Clifford, T.D. For services to Sport, to Charity and to the community in Frampton on Severn, Gloucestershire.
- Alan Clifton, Virtual School Head, National Association of Virtual School Heads. For services to Children in Care.
- Victoria Laura Elizabeth Cochrane, Director of Midwifery, Chelsea and Westminster Hospital NHS Foundation Trust. For services to Midwifery.
- Jonathan Coggan. For services to Wheelchair Rugby.
- Paulette Cohen, Head, Diversity and Inclusion, Barclays. For services to Business, and to Diversity and Inclusion.
- Roger George Cohen, Lifeboat Operations Manager, Brighton Lifeboat Station and Newhaven Lifeboat Station. For services to the RNLI and to Charity.
- Laura Collett. For services to Equestrianism.
- Michaela Collins. For services to the community in Glasgow during COVID-19.
- Nicola Catherine Colson, Head of Dose Sharing, Vaccine Taskforce, Department for Business, Energy and Industrial Strategy. For services to Global Health.
- Bernadette Conlon, President and lately Chief Executive, START. For services to Mental Health and to Disadvantaged Communities in Salford, Greater Manchester.
- John Arthur Cooke, Board Secretary, English National Opera. For services to Opera.
- Christopher Cookson, Customer Delivery Hub Technician, John Lewis & Partners. For Voluntary and Charitable services.
- Thomas Richard Cookson, chairman, Physics Partners, Kent. For services to Education.
- Lieutenant Colonel (Rtd.) Timothy Brian Jackson Coombe. For services to the community in Brampton, Cumbria.
- Lee Shane Cooper, Forest Research Worker, Forest Research. For services to Forestry.
- Barbara Anne Cooper, Corporate Director Growth, Environment and Transport, Kent County Council. For services to Transport and to the COVID-19 Response.
- Yvonne Lucy Copley, Chief Executive, Kyra's Women's Project. For services to Women and the community in York.
- Professor Alan Michael Cottenden, emeritus professor of Incontinence Technology, University College London. For services to people with incontinence.
- Dr. Alan Charles Cotton. For services to the Arts in South West England.
- David Ryan Cowling. For services to Wheelchair Rugby.
- Phillippa Mary Cramer, co-founder, The Daily Hope. For services to Older and Vulnerable People, particularly during COVID-19.
- Paul Samuel Creelman, Foster Carer and Support Worker, North Yorkshire. For services for Fostering and Youth Work.
- Brian Richard Crosby, Intelligence Manager, Home Office. For public service.
- Brian Crosby, chief executive officer, Coast and Vale Learning Trust. For services to Education in Yorkshire.
- Nicholas Cummins. For services to Wheelchair Rugby.
- Hilda May Dalziel. For services to Young People in the East End of Glasgow.
- Simon Peter Darby, Social Worker, Young Lives vs Cancer. For services to Teenagers and Young Adults with Cancer in Northern Ireland.
- Edward Norman Darke, Councillor, Longbenton Ward, North Tyneside Council. For services to the community in North Tyneside.
- Margaret Davenport. For services to Arts in the community in Suffolk.
- Ian Alexander Davidson, Principal Teacher, Guidance, Elgin Academy. For services to Education in Moray.
- John Iestyn Davies, co-founder and Chair of Cyber Wales. For services to the UK Cyber Ecosystem.
- Sharon Louise Davies, Vice President, Regulatory and public Affairs, DHL Express Europe. For services to Logistics.
- Alan George Davis, lately Director, Human Resources, Organisational Development and Estates, South West Yorkshire Partnership NHS Foundation Trust. For services to the NHS, particularly during COVID-19.
- Phillip Dawe, Team Leader, Sir Keith Park Building Restoration Project, RAF Northolt. For voluntary service to Military Aviation Heritage.
- Kathleen Mary Dawson. For services to Swimming and Women in Sport.
- Thomas William Darnton Dean. For services to Swimming.
- John David Vernon Dent. For services to Veterans, Students and People with Disabilities.
- Andrew Keith Gordon Denton, lately Head, Hotel services, Best Western Hotels. For charitable services to the NHS and Vulnerable People during COVID-19.
- Dr. Baljinder Singh Dhanda, Co-chair, UK Cyber Security Council Formation Project. For services to Cyber Security.
- Narinderjit Dhandwar, Business Relationship Manager, Barclays. For services to the Business and Financial Sectors in the West Midlands during COVID-19.
- Jeremy Dick, Woodland Officer, Forest services. For services to Forestry.
- Clare Dickens, Senior Lecturer, Nursing Studies, Mental Health, University of Wolverhampton. For services to Education and Improving Suicide Awareness.
- Kevin Francis Dickens, Director of Resources, The Abbey School, Faversham, Kent. For services to Education.
- Ezekiel Graham Dodds. For services to communities across Northern Ireland.
- David Robert Martin Donaldson. For services to Charity and to the community in Northern Ireland during COVID-19.
- Kenneth Ross Donaldson, Director of services, South East Fermanagh Foundation. For services to the community in Northern Ireland.
- Michael Brian Donegan, Founder and chief executive officer, SpecialEffect. For services to Technology for the Disabled.
- Jill Alison Douglas (Jill Douglas Hogg), Sport Presenter. For services to Sport and to Charity.
- Heather Drysdale, lately Returns Engagement Team Leader, Home Office. For public service.
- John William Murray Duncan. For political service.
- Maureen Elizabeth Dunn. For services to Drama and the Performing Arts in Northern Ireland.
- Reece Dunn. For services to Swimming.
- Thomas Gerard Dunn, lately Founder and chairman, Aeros Holdings Ltd. For services to Aviation.
- Jeremond Emeric During, chief executive officer, Money A&E. For services to Disadvantaged People and Social Enterprise.
- Jacqueline Anne Eason, Chair of Trustees, Leading Edge Academies Partnership, Cornwall. For services to Education.
- Samia Claire Edmonds. For services to the COVID-19 response.
- Jonathan Broom-Edwards. For services to Athletics.
- Antonis Eleftheriou, Contract Director, Sovereign Base Areas, Sodexo. For services to Facilities Management in support of British Forces Cyprus.
- Johnny Elford, Officer, National Crime Agency. For services to Law Enforcement.
- Ian Martin Elgeti, Forensic Manager, Thames Valley Police. For services to Policing.
- Dr. Margaret Patricia Ellis. For services to Dementia Care and to the community in St. Andrews, Fife.
- Sally Elizabeth Embree, Head, Technical Conservation Team, Historic England. For services to Heritage.
- Mark Abayomi Esho, Director, Easy Internet services Ltd and Easy Internet Solutions. For services to Business.
- Maxine Elisabeth Helen Joyce Espley, executive director, Care and Support, Green Square Accord. For services to Health and Social Care.
- Michael Norman Gwynne Evans, Trustee, Wood Street Mission. For services to Charity and to Disadvantaged People in Manchester and Salford.
- William Delwyn Evans, Head, Enforcement Transformation, Driver and Vehicle Standards Agency. For services to Road Safety during COVID-19.
- Anna Vanda Laura Fairchild. For services to Women's Martial Arts and to the NHS.
- Paul John Fairie, Head of Operations, Lighthouse Laboratory Glasgow. For services to the NHS during COVID-19.
- Hedley Rhodes Featherstone, Centenary Delivery Executive, Civil service Sports Council. For services to Civil service Sport and Volunteering.
- Luke Berenger Collett-Fenson, Senior Private Secretary to the Chief Medical Officer, Department of Health and Social Care. For public service during COVID-19.
- Lynne McLeod-Finch (Lynne Baird), Founder, Daniel Baird Foundation. For Charitable service.
- Monica Mary Fitzpatrick, Deputy Principal, Equality and LGBT+ Policy Unit, Department for Communities, Northern Ireland Executive. For services to Equality and LGBTQ+ Rights and voluntary services to Law and Order.
- Edith Mary Adelaide Flexk. For services to the community in Northern Ireland.
- Susan Deborah Fleet, managing director, Lea Graham Associates. For services to Music, to Charity and to Fundraising.
- Lucy Fletcher, Senior Trial Manager, University of Oxford. For services to Clinical Trials.
- Anya Francis. For services to Young People in Durham through Swimming.
- Katherine Elizabeth French. For services to Modern Pentathlon.
- Tara Chand Garlo, Paralegal Assistant, Crown Prosecution service. For public service.
- Kathryn Mary Draper Garraway. For services to Broadcasting, to Journalism and to Charity.
- Jaco-Albert van Gass. For services to Cycling.
- Imelda Gavin, Compliance Officer, H.M. Revenue and Customs. For services to the Excise Compliance Strategy.
- Seamus Patrick Gaynor, Company Secretary, The Birmingham Children's Trust. For services to Children's Social Care and to Education.
- Helen Elizabeth Gibson, managing director, Agencia Consulting Ltd. For services to International Trade.
- Kenneth Gibson, National Head of Safeguarding, NHS England and NHS Improvement. For services to Leadership in Healthcare.
- Piers Alexander Gilliver. For services to Fencing.
- Charles Peter Meredith Girling. For services to the Housing Sector and to Charity.
- Marcia Glanvill, Administrative Support, H.M. Revenue and Customs. For services to Workplace Wellness and to the community in Merseyside.
- Tabitha Goldstaub, chair, Al Council and co-founder, CogX. For services to the Artificial Intelligence sector.
- Hannah Rebecca Goldthorpe. For services to Vulnerable People and to the community in Blackburn, Lancashire.
- Barry Macdonald Graham, Senior Rail Advisor, Northern Trains. For services to the Rail Industry.
- The Reverend Dr. Samuel Grant. For services to the community in Carrickfergus, County Antrim.
- Dr. Allison Josephine Gray. For services to St John Ambulance in Northern Ireland.
- Ian Green, Section Manager, Nissan Training, Global Training Centre and Nissan Skills Foundation. For services to Apprenticeships and to STEM skills.
- Richard Terence Greer, Forensic Case Manager, Police service of Northern Ireland. For services to Policing and to the community in Northern Ireland.
- Professor Simon David Gregory, D.L., Deputy Medical Director, Primary and Integrated Care, Health Education England and General Practitioner, King Edward Road Surgery, Northampton. For services to General Practice.
- William John Griffiths, Director, Milton Keynes Museum. For services to Museums and to the community in Milton Keynes, Buckinghamshire.
- Kylie Grimes. For services to Wheelchair Rugby.
- Helena Grzesk, Chief Operating Officer, British Beauty Council. For services to the Beauty Industry.
- James Guy. For services to Swimming.
- Max Arthur Secret Hacon, lately deputy director, COVID-19 Response Programme, H.M. Revenue and Customs. For services to the COVID-19 Response.
- Andrew Michael Haigh. For services to the Arts.
- Professor Euan Jonathan Hails. For services to Children and Young People's Mental Health in Wales.
- Graeme Morris Hamilton, Deputy UK Chief Commissioner, Scouts. For services to Young People.
- Professor Steven Paul Hams, Chief Nurse, Gloucestershire Hospitals NHS Foundation Trust. For services to Nursing.
- Professor Simon Peter Harding, Chair Professor, Clinical Ophthalmology, University of Liverpool. For services to the Prevention of Blindness.
- Geoffrey Hardwicke, Team Leader, Hydrometry and Telemetry, Environment Agency. For services to Hydrometry.
- Sister Margaret Catherine Harlock, Chair of Governors, St Brendan's Sixth Form College, Bristol. For services to Further Education.
- John Sampson Harris, chair, British Shooting. For services to Sport.
- Neil Harris, Senior Officer, Counterfeit Currency, National Crime Agency. For services to Law Enforcement.
- Sydney Robert Harris, chairman, Festival of Brass and Voices. For services to Community Music in Scotland and to Cancer Research UK.
- Karime Hassan, Chief Executive and Growth Director, Exeter City Council. For services to Local Government.
- Professor Richard John Haynes, Professor of Renal Medicine and Clinical Trials, University of Oxford. For services to Global Health.
- Deena Heaney, Dementia Care Specialist, Derby. For services to Dementia Care.
- Charlotte Sarah Henshaw. For services to Canoeing.
- Gareth Robert Armstrong Hetherington, Temporary Chair, Governing Body, SERC. For services to Further Education.
- Christopher David Hickford, Founder and chief executive officer, The Eikon Charity. For services to Vulnerable Young People and to Charity in Surrey.
- Adam Christopher Hills, Presenter and Comedian. For services to Paralympic Sport and Disability Awareness.
- Angela Holdsworth, chief executive officer, The Sea View Trust, Lancashire. For services to Children and Young People with Special Educational Needs.
- Stephen Anthony Holland, Assistant Manager, England National Football Team. For services to Association Football.
- Dr. Helen Brewster Holman, lately Headteacher, Orchard School, Bristol. For services to Education.
- Paul Mayo Holt. For services to International Trade, to Education and to the UK's PPE Supply Chain.
- Anna Hopkin. For services to Swimming.
- Barry Horne, chief executive officer, Activity Alliance. For services to Inclusivity in Sport.
- Cherylee Houston, Actress. For services to Drama and to People with Disabilities.
- Heather Sara Houston, Lecturer, Belfast Metropolitan College. For services to Further Education and to Older People in Northern Ireland.
- Marilyn Hubbard, Chair of Trustees, Inspiring Futures through Learning Multi-Academy Trust, Milton Keynes. For services to Education.
- Paul Clifford Hugill, Owner and Head Chef, The Priory Hotel, Louth. For services to People with Learning Difficulties.
- Charlene Patricia Hunter, Founder and chief executive officer, Coding Black Females. For services to Technology and to Diversity.
- Sonja Ute Huxham, Basic Skills Development Manager, Army Training Regiment. For services to Military Education.
- Tony Hyland, Senior National Account Manager, Department for Work and Pensions. For services to Disadvantaged People.
- Dr. Adaeze Ifezulike, General Practitioner. For services to Health Inequalities in Black, Asian and Minority Ethnic Communities in Scotland.
- Rashid Tahir Iqbal, chief executive officer, The Winch. For services to Young People.
- Jayne Elizabeth Jardine, chief executive officer, The Rise Partnership Trust, London. For services to Education and SEND.
- Calum George Jarvis. For services to Swimming.
- Oliver Brendan Jeffers, Author and Illustrator. For services to the Arts.
- Angela Johnson, Supply Chain Manager, Morrisons. For services to the Food Supply Chain.
- Claudette Elaine Johnson, co-founder, BLK Art Group. For services to Art.
- Paul Mark Johnston, Head Coach and Project Manager, Monkstown Amateur Boxing Club. For services to Sport and to the community in County Antrim.
- David Jonathan, Director, Grassroots Programme, Luton Council of Faiths and Near Neighbours Programme. For services to Community Cohesion and Interfaith Relations in Luton, Bedfordshire.
- Helen Jones, Chief Executive, MindOut. For services to LGBTQ+ Mental Health
- Gary Michael Jordan, chair, Mansfield and Ashfield 2020 Business Club and Executive Business Coach. For services to the Economy and to the community in Mansfield and Ashfield, Nottinghamshire.
- Annette Constance Joseph, Founder, Diverse and Equal. For services to Technology.
- Dr. Agnes Aranka Kaposi, FREng. For services to Holocaust Education and Awareness.
- Professor Nazira Karodia, lately Professor of Science Education, University of Wolverhampton. For services to the Chemical Sciences.
- Tully Alicia Jacqueline Kearney. For services to Swimming.
- Dior Adelle Kelly, Relationship Manager, Virgin Money. For services to the Financial Sector during COVID-19.
- Neil Emile Elias Kenlock, co-founder, Choice FM. For services to Media.
- Erin Kennedy. For services to Rowing.
- Siobhan Mary Kenny, Chief Executive, Radiocentre. For services to Commercial Radio and Young People.
- Rebecca Ann Kershaw. For services to the community in Oldham.
- Bibi Rabbiyah Khan, President, London Islamic Cultural Society. For services to Local Government and Community Cohesion.
- Kaneez Khan, Coordinator, Near Neighbours, West Yorkshire. For services to Interfaith Relations, particularly during COVID-19.
- Mumtaz Khan. For services to tackling Food Poverty in the UK and Abroad.
- Qamar Mahmood Khan, Chair of Trustees, Hamro Foundation. For services to Cricket and to Charity.
- Reynold James Kirk. For services to the North Irish Horse Regimental Association and to the Carrickfergus Community Heritage Project.
- Pravesh Kumar. For services to Theatre.
- Edwina Jayne Langley, Lead Attendance Officer, Birmingham City Council. For services to Education.
- Joanne Mary Lappin, Chief Executive of Cumbria LEP. For services to the Economy in Cumbria.
- Hardip Parkesh Singh Lawana, Senior Officer, Border Force, Home Office. For services to Border Security and to Workplace Wellbeing.
- Timothy John Lawler, Chief Executive, Sports Aid. For services to Sport for Young People.
- Alan Leslie Laws, Vice President, British Canoeing. For services to Canoeing.
- Jessica Learmonth. For services to Triathlon.
- Matthew Lee. For services to Diving.
- Simon Norris Lee, Group Chief Executive, Civil service Sports Council. For services to Sport and Wellbeing.
- Janet Belinda Lefley, Community Manager, The Romsey School, Hampshire. For services to Education.
- Dr. Vivienne Catherine Lennox, Chair of Governors, Suffield Park Infant and Nursery School, Norfolk. For services to Education.
- Henry Lewis, Honorary Vice President, The Magic Circle. For services to Fundraising and Charitable Causes.
- Emma Ruth Lindley, co-founder, Women in Identity. For services to promoting Diversity and Inclusion in the Digital Identity Sector in the UK and Abroad.
- Beverley Little (Mark Little). For services to Victims of Modern Slavery.
- Cynthia Lloyd (Cyndy Lloyd). For services to Young People in Cheshire.
- Sanjay Lobo, chief executive officer and Founder, OnHand. For services to Older People, particularly during COVID-19.
- Trevor William Lockhart, Chief Executive, Fane Valley Co-operative Society Ltd. For services to the Agri-Food Industry and to the Economy in Northern Ireland.
- James Lovett, Team Leader, Ministry of Defence. For services to Defence.
- Tracy Luke, Chair of Governors, Turner Free School, Folkestone, Kent. For services to Education.
- Fiona Louise Mackenzie, Founder, We Can't Consent to This. For services to Raising Awareness of Sexual Violence Against Women.
- James Mackie, J.P., chair, Lifeboat Management Group, Southend-on-Sea Lifeboat Station. For services to the RNLI and to Charity.
- Paul Francis John Mackin, Town Councillor and Mayor, Shefford Town, Bedfordshire. For services to Local Government.
- Mairead Mackle, Founder and chief executive officer, Tarasis Enterprises. For services to Economic Development in Northern Ireland.
- Frederick George Magee. For services to Association Football in East Belfast.
- Anne Mairead Maguire, lately Project Lead Digital Admissions, Education Authority Northern Ireland. For services to Education.
- Munir Faizal Mamujee, managing director, m2r Education. For services to Education and to Exports.
- Susan Lesley Manns, Director, Sue Manns Associates. For services to Planning.
- George Lennox Marcar, Driver Policy Implementation Manager, Transport for London. For services to Transport in London.
- Patricia Ann Marchiori, lately Chair of Trustees, Ambitions Academy Trust, Poole. For services to Education.
- Nicholas Peter Marsh, Consultant Forensic Imaging Practitioner, Metropolitan Police service. For services to Policing.
- Dr. Marie Eileen Marshall, Nurse Consultant for Transition, Manchester University NHS Foundation Trust. For services to Children and Young People's Health.
- Daniel William Munro Martin. For services to Libraries and to Heritage in Scotland.
- Selby William Martin, chair and Trustee, Shropshire Branch, Council for the Protection of Rural England. For services to the community in Shropshire.
- Marc William Masey, Senior Private Secretary to the Chief Medical Officer, Department for Health and Social Care. For public service during COVID-19.
- Susan Jabeena Maslin. For services to Modern Pentathlon.
- Arron John Masperot, Programme Delivery Manager, Census Field Devices, Office for National Statistics. For services to Census 2021 Field Operations.
- Jacqueline Maxwell, Head, Customer Relations, SSE. For services to the Energy Supply Industry.
- Janet McAlister, lately Lead Officer, School Catering service, Education Authority Northern Ireland. For services to Education in Northern Ireland.
- Laurence McBreen. For services to the Social Work Sector in South Wales.
- Margaret Pearl McBride, Vice Principal, Bangor Academy and Sixth Form College, Northern Ireland. For services to Education.
- Professor Jackie McCoy, Professor, Management Development and Associate Dean for Global Engagement, Ulster University. For services to Higher Education, to Business and to the Arts.
- Janet Marjorie McDermott, lately Head of Membership, Women's Aid Federation, England. For services to the Prevention of Violence against Women and Girls.
- Stuart Rainey McDonald, Head of Demographic Assumptions and Methodology, Lloyds Banking Group. For services to public Health.
- Thomas Bruce McEwen. For services to Equestrianism.
- Roger Colin McFarland. For services to the community in Chelmsford, Essex.
- Kay McIntyre, Youth Support and Participation, Young People Manager, East Cheshire Council. For services to Children and Young People.
- Angela Mary Veronica McIntyre, D.L. For services to the Foyle Hospice and to the community in County Londonderry.
- Eilidh Jane McIntyre. For services to Sailing.
- Norman McKinley, executive director, UK Operations, British Red Cross. For services to the COVID-19 Response.
- William James McLarin. For services to Scouting and to Voluntary service in County Down.
- Kamini Harshadbhai Mehta (Bina Mehta), chair, KPMG UK. For services to Trade and Investments in the UK and to Female Entrepreneurs.
- Valerie Metcalfe, lately Councillor, Essex County Council. For political and public service.
- Victoria Jane Miles, D.L., Chief Executive, Northamptonshire Community Foundation. For services to the community in Northamptonshire during COVID-19.
- Owen Miller. For services to Athletics.
- Terry Miller, chief executive officer, Independent Living Agency. For services to People with Disabilities in the London Borough of Barking and Dagenham.
- Richard Mills. For services to Law Enforcement.
- Carol Joan Moody, Foster Carer, Kent County Council. For services to Foster Care.
- Derek Richard Moody, Foster Carer, Kent County Council. For services to Foster Care.
- Christopher Mark Moore, Vice-chair, Bletchley Park Trust and chair, FightforSight. For charitable and voluntary services to Heritage and to Visually Impaired People.
- Graham Moore, lately chair, Westfield Health Charitable Trust. For services to Charity.
- Jacqueline Mai Moore. For services to Girl Guiding in Northern Ireland.
- Elizabeth Anne Morrison, Founder Member, Aberdeen Angus Quality Beef Ltd, Northern Ireland. For services to Agriculture.
- Heather Rose Morrison. For services to Dementia services, to Scouting and to the community in Aberdeenshire.
- Simon Christopher Aidan Morton, Deputy Chief Executive Officer, UK Sport. For services to Sport.
- Kevin Moseley, Founder and chief executive officer, SwimFin Ltd. For services to International Trade, to Investment and to Charity.
- Dr. Beth Mosley, Consultant Clinical Psychologist, Thurston Community College, West Suffolk, Norfolk and Suffolk NHS Foundation Trust. For services to Mental Health.
- Anne Mossop Head, Parliamentary Health and Wellbeing services. For services to Parliament.
- Mark Glenn Murphy. For services to Radio and to the community in Suffolk.
- Karen Jean Napier, chief executive officer, The Reading Agency. For services to Arts, to Culture, to Reading and to public Libraries.
- Christopher Paul Nash. For services to Dance and to Photography.
- Sobia Iqbal Nawaz, Customer service Manager, Santander. For services to the Financial Sector and to the community in the London Borough of Hounslow during COVID-19.
- Simon Naresh Nayyar. For political service.
- Colin Hugh Neill, Chief Executive, Hospitality Ulster. For services to the Hospitality Industry in Northern Ireland.
- Brian Geofrey Newell, chairman, Shackerley Holdings Group Ltd. For services to the Tiling and Ceramics Industry.
- Kathryn Newell, lately Head, Business and Innovation, Government Office for Science. For services to Government Science.
- Danny Lewis Newland, Custodial Manager, H.M. Prison Littlehey. For public service.
- Maisie Summers-Newton. For services to Swimming.
- Angus Walter Graeme Nicoll, lately managing director, Peter Greig & Co Ltd. For services to the Textile Industry.
- Pretty Nkiwane, Social Care and service Manager, Hertfordshire Children services. For services to Children's Social Care during COVID-19.
- Joanne Patricia Norry, Director, Libraries and Student services, Leeds Beckett University. For services to Higher Education and to Social Inclusion.
- Berendina Jill Norton, Professor of Music, Royal Military School of Music. For services to Music.
- Kevin Barnaby Nutt. For services to Young People through Sport and the Duke of Edinburgh Awards.
- Patrick Nyarumbu, executive director of Strategy, People and Partnerships, Birmingham and Solihull Mental Health NHS Foundation Trust. For services to Nursing.
- Roger Oakley, Fundraiser, Lord's Taverners. For services to Charitable Fundraising for Children with Disabilities.
- Diane O'Donnell, Work Coach, Laurieston Jobcentre Plus, Department for Work & Pensions. For public service.
- Jacqueline Mary O'Hanlon, Director of Learning, Royal Shakespeare Company. For services to the Arts.
- Natalie Abigail Ojevah, Programmes Manager, Barclays. For services to Business Development, and to Diversity and Inclusion.
- Peter Oldham, County Vice President, Tame Valley Birmingham Scouts. For service to Scouting in the West Midlands.
- Denise Rosemary O'Leary, Founder, Purpol Marketing. For services to the Construction Industry and Entrepreneurs in South West England and Wales.
- Natalie O'Rourke, Proprietor, Park Lane Stables Riding for the Disabled. For services to People with Disabilities and to the community in Teddington, London Borough of Richmond upon Thames.
- Dr. Angelina Gillian Osborne. For services to Cultural Heritage.
- Sarah Osborne, Branch Support Manager, National Crime Agency. For services to Law Enforcement.
- Sayyed Osman, Strategic Director of Adults and Health, Blackburn with Darwen Borough Council. For services to the community in East Lancashire.
- Judith Anne Ownes, Chief Executive, Titanic Belfast. For services to Tourism.
- Dr. Dean Hugh Pallant. For services to the community through the Salvation Army.
- Susan Elizabeth Parish, Business and Community Manager, Park Community School, Havant, Hampshire. For services to Education.
- Sheila Parker. For services to Women's Football and to Charity.
- Elizabeth Parkes. For services to Climate Change and Environmental Protection.
- Dr. Adele Parks, Author. For services to Literature.
- Stephen Parry. For services to Swimming.
- George William Paul. For services to British Horseracing Heritage.
- Rosalind May Paul, chief executive officer and artistic director, Scene and Heard. For charitable services to Theatre, to Young People and to Families in Somers Town, London Borough of Camden.
- Dr. Sheila Person (Sheila Kanani), Education, Outreach and Diversity Manager, Royal Astronomical Society. For services to Astronomy and to Diversity in Physics.
- Daniel Dean Pembrooke. For services to Athletics.
- Dr. Robert Brian Perks, Lead Curator, Oral History and Director of National Life Stories, British Library. For services to Libraries, to the National Archives and to Oral History, particularly during the COVID-19 Pandemic.
- Hilary Elizabeth Perrin, lately Director, Regional Organisation, The Labour Party. For political service.
- Zaron Perry, lately Principal, Trinity Nursery School, Bangor, Northern Ireland. For services to Pre-School Education.
- Ian McGregor Philip. For services to the community in Dunning, Perthshire.
- Isaac Phillip, Trade Capability Adviser, Department for International Trade. For services to International Trade.
- Kim Phillips, Head of Catering and Facilities services, Rotherham Metropolitan Borough Council. For public service.
- Aaron David Phipps. For services to Wheelchair Rugby.
- Jane Michelle Pickthall, Virtual School Head, North Tyneside. For services to Children and Families in Tyne and Wear.
- Thomas Pidcock. For services to Cycling.
- Phoebe Paterson Pine. For services to Archery.
- Angela Plummer, lately Director, Adult services, Swindon Borough Council. For services to Vulnerable People.
- Robert Kenneth Polhill, lately Leader, Halton Borough Council. For services to the community in Halton, Cheshire.
- Richard David Port, Solicitor, George Green and Company, Cradley Heath, West Midlands. For services to Victims of Domestic Abuse.
- David Porter, Security Officer, University of Sunderland. For services to University Security.
- Stewart Colin Powell. For services to People with Polio in the UK and to the Criminal Justice System.
- Sandra Beverley Prail, Governor, Brighton, Hove & Sussex Sixth Form College. For services to Education.
- Lauren Louise Price. For services to Boxing.
- Elizabeth Jane Pryor, chief executive officer, The Anne Robson Trust. For services to End of Life Care.
- Irna Mumtaz Qureshi, co-founder, Bradford Literature Festival. For services to Heritage.
- Avin Rabheru, Founder, Housekeep. For services to Entrepreneurship and to Digital Innovation in the Cleaning Industry.
- Lynne Radbone, Principal Paediatric Dietitian, Cambridge University Hospitals NHS Foundation Trust. For services to Sick and Premature Babies.
- Emma Raducanu, Tennis player. For services to Tennis.
- Virinder Kuljit Kaur Rai, Business Support Manager, Against Violence and Abuse Charity. For services to the Charity Sector and to the community in the London Borough of Redbridge.
- Giedrė Rakauskaitė. For services to Rowing.
- Onjali Qatara Rauf, Author and Founder, Making Herstory. For services to Literature and to Women's Rights.
- Professor Emma Redding, Professor of Performance Science and Head of Dance Science, Trinity Laban Conservatoire of Music and Dance. For services to Dance.
- Paul Rees, Chief Executive, Royal College of Psychiatrists. For services to Mental Health and to Equality, Diversity and Inclusion.
- Thomas Stephen Stirling Reid, Chief Officer, Belfast Harbour Police. For services to the Maritime Industry.
- Susan Reilly (Sue Thorpe), Senior Delivery Lead, Regional Delivery Directorate, Department for Education. For services to Education.
- Luke Xavier Reynolds, Senior Private Secretary to the Government Chief Scientific Adviser, Government Office for Science. For services to Science in Government.
- Louise Diane Rhodes, University of Wolverhampton. For services to Education and to People with Hearing Impairments.
- David James Richards, co-founder and chief executive officer, WANdisco and co-founder, The David and Jane Richards Family Foundation. For services to the Information Technology Sector and to Young People, particularly during COVID-19.
- Jane Richards, co-founder, The David and Jane Richards Family Foundation. For services to the Information Technology Sector and to Young People, particularly during COVID-19.
- Matthew Richards. For services to Swimming.
- Samantha Claire Richardson, Director, National Coastal Tourism Academy. For services to Coastal Tourism in England during COVID-19.
- Ella Ritchie, Director, Intoart. For services to the Arts and to Disability.
- Dr. Edward Morgan Roberts, D.L. For services to Medicine and to the community in Swansea and Neath Port Talbot.
- James Penry Roberts. For services to Wheelchair Rugby.
- Stewart Roberts, Founder, Haircuts4Homeless. For services to Homeless People.
- Michael Peter Howes-Roberts. For services to Government Technology, particularly during the COVID-19 Response.
- Mark Joseph Robinson, Olympic Performance Manager, Royal Yachting Association. For services to Sailing.
- Stuart Robinson. For services to Wheelchair Rugby.
- Dr. Justin William George Roe, Consultant and Joint-Head, Department of Speech Voice and Swallowing, The Royal Marsden NHS Foundation Trust, Clinical service Lead (Airways/Laryngology), Imperial College Healthcare NHS Trust, Honorary Clinical Senior Lecturer, Imperial College London. For services to Speech and Language Therapy, particularly during COVID-19.
- Catharine Anna Roff, Director, Adults and Health, Leeds City Council. For services to Social Care.
- Yvonne Michell Valerie Rogan, Policy Adviser, public Bodies Team, Cabinet Office. For services to Diversity and Inclusion.
- Jeremy Rook, Head, Business Assurance, H.M. Prison Elmley. For services to Reducing Reoffending.
- Emma Louise Rosewarne, Head, Player Welfare and Operations Director, Rugby Football League. For services to Rugby League Football.
- Matthew Rotherham. For services to Cycling.
- Barbara Elizabeth Rounsevell. For services to the community in Cornwall.
- Nicholas George Rouse. For services to the community in Ridgewell, Essex.
- Omeima Mudawi-Rowlings. For services to People with Disabilities in the Arts.
- Kerry Michael Rubie, Patron and lately chair, Friends of the Elderly. For services to Innovation, Leadership and Governance in Adult Social Care.
- Dr. Amar Nath Rughani, General Practitioner and Provost, Royal College of General Practitioners, South Yorkshire and North Trent. For services to General Practice.
- Joanna Claire Ruxton, Founder, Ocean Generation. For services to Marine Conservation.
- Christopher Ryan. For services to Wheelchair Rugby.
- Mandip Kaur Sahota, Founder, Strategies and Stories. For Charitable and public service.
- Joanna Mary Salter, Pilot and Aviation Ambassador, Department for Transport. For services to Aviation.
- John Charles Edward Salter, Head of Private Office, Vaccine Taskforce, Department for Business, Energy and Industrial Strategy. For public service.
- Zimran Samuel, Human Rights Barrister. For services to Victims of Domestic Abuse.
- Dr. Iram Sattar, General Practitioner and Trustee, Muslim Women's Network UK and The Passage. For services to the Health and Wellbeing of Vulnerable People.
- Duncan William Macnaughton Scott. For services to Swimming.
- Jacqueline Scott, Head Teacher, Trinity Primary School, Edinburgh. For services to Education.
- Rebecca Scott, Employability and Opportunity Manager, Human Resources, University of Bristol. For services to Disadvantaged Communities.
- Robert William Scott, Chief Executive, Prison Fellowship Northern Ireland. For services to Prisoners and their Families in Northern Ireland.
- Dylan James Fletcher-Scott. For services to Sailing.
- Charan Kanwal Singh Sekhon, Senior Environment Officer, Environment Agency and Founder Chairman, SEVA Trust UK. For services to Charity, to Diversity and to the Environment, particularly during COVID-19.
- Mohammad Sehreen Seleem. For services to Disadvantaged Communities in East London.
- Dr. Abdul Karim Sesay, Genomics Facility Lead, Medical Research Council Unit, The Gambia. For services to Charity and Medical Research.
- Selasi Awo Setufe. For services to Diversity in Architecture.
- Deborah Michelle Sewell, Legal Adviser and Legal Team Manager, H.M. Courts and Tribunals service. For services to the Administration of Justice and to Vulnerable and Homeless People.
- Edwin John Shanks. For services to the Northern Ireland Ambulance service.
- David Anthony Sharp. For services to Broadcasting and to Education.
- Mhairi Macewan Sharp, chief executive officer, National Emergencies Trust. For services to the COVID-19 response.
- Kester Sharpe, lately Deputy UK Chief Commissioner, Scouts. For services to Young People, particularly during COVID-19.
- Natalie Charlotte Shaw, Director, Employment Affairs, International Chamber of Shipping. For services to Seafarers during the COVID-19 Pandemic.
- Paul Shaw, Head Coach, Great Britain Wheelchair Rugby Ltd. For services to Wheelchair Rugby.
- Mitesh Pispakkant Sheth, chief executive officer, Redington. For services to Diversity and Inclusion in the Financial services Sector.
- Bethany Shriever For services to Bicycle Motocross Racing.
- Kim Shutler, chief executive officer, The Cellar Trust. For services to People with Mental Health Issues.
- Christine Denise Simmons, Housekeeper and Health and Safety Co-ordinator, Condover College Ltd. For services to Adults with Learning Disabilities during COVID-19.
- Emma Louise Simpson, Director, Simpson Brickwork Conservation Ltd. For services to Heritage Conservation.
- James Malcolm Sinclair. For services to Charity.
- Mamta Rani Singhal, Volunteer, Institution of Engineering and Technology. For services to Engineering.
- Bharatkumar Jagatsingh Sisodia. For services to the Culture, to Heritage and to the community in Greater Manchester.
- Christopher Peter Skelley. For services to Judo.
- Andrew Small. For services to Athletics.
- Gillian Smallwood, chief executive officer, Fortalice. For services to Victims of Domestic Abuse.
- Amanda Smith (Amanda Austin), Executive Head Teacher, Fernwood Primary and Nursery School, Nottingham. For services to Education.
- David Smith, chair, Community Managed Libraries Network. For services to Libraries.
- Jack Dalziel Smith. For services to Wheelchair Rugby.
- Paul Smith, lately Fraud Response Team Leader, Scottish Government. For services to the Counter Fraud Profession in Scotland.
- Wayne Simeon Smith. For services to People with Mental Health Issues and to the community in Dover, Kent.
- Jason Smyth. For services to Paralympic Athletics and to the Sporting Community in Northern Ireland.
- Craiger Solomons, Lead Analyst, Technical Advisory Cell, Welsh Government. For public service.
- Katherine Mary Sparkes, Founder, Flamingo Chicks CIO. For services to Children with Disabilities and their Families.
- Diana Jane Staines. For services to People with Disabilities in Norfolk, particularly during COVID-19.
- Oliver Stanhope. For services to Rowing.
- Jamie Jay Stead. For services to Wheelchair Rugby.
- Lauren Steadman. For services to Triathlon.
- Vivienne Esther Catherine Stern, Director, Universities UK International. For services to International Education.
- Craig Angus Stewart. For services to Young People in Dollar, Clackmannanshire.
- Jonathan Stewart, Forensics Operation Manager, Merseyside Police. For services to Policing.
- Ransford George Stewart, Director, Stewart Management and Planning Solutions. For services to Planning.
- Kerry Lynne Strockley, Governor, Preston Primary School, Stockton-on-Tees. For services to Education.
- Millar Thomas Stoddart, D.L. For services to Sport and to the Voluntary Sector in Scotland.
- Bridget Lara Stratford, Project Coordinator, North East Solidarity and Teaching, Newcastle University. For services to Refugees and Asylum Seekers, particularly during COVID-19.
- Deane Street, Team Leader, Ministry of Defence. For services to Defence.
- Martyn John Styles. For services to Junior and Youth Sailing.
- Laura Sugar. For services to Canoeing.
- The Reverend Jonathan Swales, Founder, Lighthouse. For services to the community in Leeds, particularly during COVID-19.
- Jason Swettenham, National Head, Prison Industries, Catering, Retail services and Physical Education, H.M. Prison and Probation service. For services to Sport.
- Dr. Bnar Talabani, Kidney and Transplant Medical Specialist, University of Wales and Immunology Scientist. For services to the NHS and to the Ethnic Minority Communities in Wales, particularly during COVID-19.
- Dorothy Joy Tarrant, Founder, Veritas-Sighisoara. For voluntary service in Romania.
- Mandy Taylor, For charitable services in Yorkshire.
- Jennifer Taylor, Leader, Early Professionals Programmes, IBM UK, and chair, Digital and Technology Solutions Level 6 Degree Apprenticeship Trailblazer. For services to Education.
- Margherita Taylor, Radio and Television Presenter. For services to Broadcasting and to Diversity.
- Michèle Louise Alma Taylor, Director for Change, Ramps on the Moon. For services to Theatre and People with Disabilities.
- Caroline Thomas, Member, British Standards Institute Committee on Accessibility. For services to Consumers.
- Rhian Louise Thomas, Head of Area Business Centre, Crown Prosecution service, Cymru-Wales. For services to Law and Order.
- Angela Thompson. For voluntary service in Northern Ireland, particularly during COVID-19.
- Daniel Paul Thomson. For services to Lytham Coastguard Rescue Team, Lancashire.
- Oliver David Townend. For services to Equestrianism.
- Anna March Trye, D.L. For services to Young People and the Bereaved in Warwickshire.
- Joy Sheridan Tubbs, Director, Salisbury Diocesan Board of Education. For services to Education.
- Jonathan Charles Turner, South West Regional Head, Laboratory Operations, public Health England. For services to public Health during COVID-19.
- Clare Twomey. For services to Art.
- Saleem Uddin, Category Director, Crown Commercial service, Cabinet Office. For public and Charitable services.
- Martyn Stanley Underhill, lately Police and Crime Commissioner, Dorset. For services to Mental Health Awareness and Support.
- Andrea Vincent, Chair MK-Act, Milton Keynes. For services to Victims of Domestic Abuse.
- Charles Viva, D.L., Founder and Trustee Interplast UK. For services to Plastic and Reconstructive Surgery in the Developing World.
- Abeda Suleman Vorajee. For services to Community Integration and Interfaith Understanding in Warwickshire.
- Lynne Wade, Prison Educator H.M. Prisons Lindholme, Moorland and H.M. Young Offenders Institution Hatfield. For services to Prisoner Education.
- Gavin Matthew Walker. For services to Wheelchair Rugby.
- Matthew Thomas Walls. For services to Cycling.
- Stacy Anne Walsh, Local Authority Relationship Manager, Valuation Office Agency. For public service.
- Michael John Walters, Lifeboat Operations Manager, Loughor Inshore Lifeboat. For service to the community in Swansea.
- Professor Anthony Barrington Ward, lately Professor, Rehabilitation Medicine, Midlands Partnership NHS Foundation Trust. For services to Rehabilitation Medicine and People with Disabilities.
- Jayne Ann Ward, lately Leader, Merseyside Districts Large Recruitment Team, Department for Work and Pensions. For public service in Merseyside.
- Joyce Sylvia Ward, chair, Resident Partnership Board, Sovereign Housing. For services to Social Housing.
- Lorna Ward. For services to Children's Hearings in Dundee.
- Martyn Leander Storme Ward, Lifeguard Supervisor, Cornwall. For services to the RNLI and to Charity.
- Dr. Norman Allan Waterman. For services to Materials, to Manufacturing and to Nuclear Engineering.
- Benjamin Michael Watson. For services to Cycling.
- Annette Jean Getty Weekes, Leader, East Lancashire COVID Manufacturing Cluster. For services to Business and to the community in East Lancashire.
- Caroline Jane Wells, D.L., Director, JComms. For services to the public Relations Industry, to the Economy and to the community in Northern Ireland.
- Lorna Havard Weston, managing director, Thera East Anglia. For services to People with Learning Disabilities.
- Matthew James White, Director, Campus Commerce, University of Reading. For services to the Catering and Hospitality Industry.
- Professor Lorraine Elisabeth Whitmarsh, Professor of Environmental Psychology, University of Bath. For services to Social Research in Climate Change, Energy and Transport.
- Professor Nalin Chandra Wickramasinghe. For services to Science, Astronomy and Astrobiology.
- Caroline Mary Wilkinson, Volunteer and Trustee, Fine Cell Work. For services to the Rehabilitation of Offenders and to the community in South London.
- Michelle Kay Willett, chief executive officer, The Gallery Trust, Oxfordshire. For services to Children and Young People with Special Educational Needs and Disabilities.
- Adeyemi Adedamola Williams, Superintendent Pharmacist, Bedminster Pharmacy. For services to the NHS and to the community in South Bristol, particularly during COVID-19.
- Alison Williams, Headteacher, Craigfelen School, Swansea. For services to Education and to the community in Swansea.
- Timothy John Williams, lately chief executive officer, Welsh Automotive Forum. For services to the Automotive Industry.
- Timothy John Walkden-Williams. For services to Business and to the community in Prestatyn, North Wales.
- Andrew Wilson, managing director, Destination Food Brands Division, Greene King. For services to Business and to Charity during COVID-19.
- Ingrid Lesley Wilson. For services to the Community Cohesion, to Race Equality and to Global Education.
- Jo-Anne Wilson, Manager, Galanos House Care Home, Royal British Legion. For services to Veterans.
- Peter John Wilson, Trustee, Milton Keynes Special Needs Advancement Project. For services to People with Educational Disabilities.
- Charlotte Worthington. For services to Bicycle Motor Cross Racing.
- Dr. Nicholas Hans Woznitza, Senior Lecturer, Canterbury Christ Church University and Consultant Radiographer, University College London Hospitals NHS Foundation Trust. For services to Radiography and to the COVID-19 response.
- The Reverend Canon David Stanley Chadwick Wyatt. For services to Homeless People and to the community in Salford, Greater Manchester.
- Helen Margaret Wyatt. For services to Homeless People and to the community in Salford, Greater Manchester.
- Galal Yafai. For services to Boxing.
- Alexander Yee. For services to Triathlon.
- Thomas Robert Young. For services to Athletics.

Overseas and International List

- Stephen William Atherton, Retired Headmaster. For services to British Education and Culture in Greece
- Andrew John Bailey, Former Chair, Leonard Cheshire Disability Home in Portugal. For services to Disability Charities
- Poppy Baker, Team Leader, Foreign, Commonwealth and Development Office. For services to British foreign policy
- Professor Lorand Bartels, Professor of International Law, University of Cambridge. For services to UK Trade Policy
- Yasmin Batliwala, Chief Executive, Advocates for International Development. For services to Human Rights, the Rule of Law and to International Development
- Dr. Keith Michael Borien, chief executive officer, The Borien Educational Foundation for Southern Africa. For services to schools in rural areas of the Eastern Cape, South Africa
- Dr. Richard James Burgess, President and chief executive officer, American Association of Independent Music. For services to Music
- Maria João Carrapato, chair, Oporto British School, Portugal. For services to British Education in Portugal
- Deborah Louise Chilcott, Assistant Private Secretary to the UK Ambassador to the European Union, Brussels, Belgium. For services to British foreign policy
- Clark John Chittenden, lately Director, Trade Policy Coordination, British Embassy Mexico City, Mexico. For services to UK/Mexico trade relations
- The Reverend John Howard Chinchen, Archbishop of Hong Kong's Chaplain for International Ministry. For services to the British Community in Hong Kong.
- Susanna Cole, Teacher. For services to children and the community in Kikambala, Kenya and to the Parkinson's Society
- Sarah Croft, Lead Negotiator, International Agreements, Foreign, Commonwealth and Development Office. For services to UK Trade overseas
- Hazel Patricia Cumbo, Chief Executive, Gibraltar Courts service. For services to Justice in Gibraltar
- Kenneth Ronald Dunn, Chair of Africa's Gift Ltd. For services to development and local communities in Lesotho and sub-Saharan Africa
- Daniel Liam Edge, Team Leader, Foreign, Commonwealth and Development Office. For services to British foreign policy
- Allison Fisher, Professional Billiard Player. For services to Sport
- Dr. Joseph Froncioni, Orthopaedic Surgeon. For services to Road Safety in Bermuda
- John Philip Hare, De-mining Technical Director, Falkland Islands. For services to the Falkland Islands Demining Programme
- Dale Harrison, Head of Treaty Section, Legal Directorate, Foreign, Commonwealth and Development Office. For services to British foreign policy
- James Hollow, Japan President, Fabric Inc. and lately chair of the Board of Trustees, The British School, Tokyo, Japan. For services to Education and the wider community in Japan
- Stuart Holroyd, Team Leader, Foreign, Commonwealth and Development Office. For services to British foreign policy
- Alastair James Irving, Team Leader, Foreign, Commonwealth and Development Office. For services to British foreign policy
- Kevin Thomas Kerrigan, Senior Automotive Adviser. For services to the UK Automotive industry in the United States of America
- Dr. Michael MacKenzie, Consultant in General Medicine and Infectious Diseases, Daeyang Luke Missionary Hospital, Lilongwe, Malawi. For services to Health in Malawi
- William Henderson McAteer, Historian. For services to Seychelles history.
- Marigay McKee, Managing partner, Fernbrook Capital LLC and Founder, MM Luxe Consulting, New York, United States of America. For services to British retail overseas
- Manohar Narindas Melwani, Tailor, Hong Kong. For services to Business and Charity in Hong Kong
- Lloyd Milen, British Consul General for Andorra, Aragon, Balearic Islands and Catalonia, British Consulate General, Barcelona, Spain. For services to British nationals in Spain and to the UK in North-East Spain
- Angus William Reed Miller, Prosperity Lead, Horn of Africa, Economic Development, British Office Hargeisa, Somaliland. For services to International Development in Somaliland
- Katherine Fiona Mitchell, executive director, GBx global. For services to British Entrepreneurs Overseas
- Jeremy Morgan, QC, Vice Chair, British in Europe. For services to British nationals in Italy and the European Union
- Professor Ian Elliot Murdoch, Consultant Ophthalmologist. For services to Health in Western Africa
- Thomas Robert Pember Finn, Second Secretary Human Rights, British Embassy Beijing, China. For services to British foreign policy
- Jane Ellen Phelan, Account Director, Crown Agents. For services to public Health during COVID-19
- Lucille Dell Seymour Bem, retired Cayman Islands Government official. For services to Sport, Education and the people of Grand Cayman and the Cayman Islands
- Elizabeth Simpson, Team Leader, Foreign, Commonwealth and Development Office. For services to British foreign policy
- Sharon Karen Smith, retired Deputy Clerk, the Cayman Islands Legislative Assembly. For public service to the Cayman Islands
- Christopher James Syer, President of the Malaysian British Society. For services to UK/Malaysia relations and to the British Community in Egypt and Saudi Arabia
- Melvyn Lewis Tennant, Founder/Director of the Oracabessa Bay Sea Turtle Project and Lead Warden, Jamaica. For services to Marine Conservation in Jamaica
- Vanessa Elizabeth Thomas-Williams, Nursery Officer, Terrestrial Conservation/Environment, Natural Resources and Planning Portfolio Directorate, St Helena. For services to Conservation in St Helena
- Ben Robert Thomson, Honorary Consul, Chiang Mai, Thailand. For services to British nationals overseas
- Amanda Susan Thursfield, Director, Non-Catholic Cemetery for foreigners, Rome, Italy. For services to the Bereaved in Italy
- Pamela Twissell-Cross, District Community Support Coordinator, Royal British Legion, Spain (district north). For services to British nationals overseas
- Alexandra Utkucu, Vice Consul, British Consulate General Istanbul, Turkey. For services to British nationals overseas
- Philip Graham Wall, co-founder and Trustee, We See Hope and founding Director, Signify Ltd. For services to vulnerable children in sub-Saharan Africa
- Wendy Susan Wall, co-founder and Trustee, We See Hope. For services to vulnerable children in sub-Saharan Africa
- Nicola Willey, lately Regional Director of Science and Innovation, South East Asia, British High Commission Singapore. For services to UK Science and Innovation overseas
- Charlotte Emily Williams, Head, Foreign and Security Policy, British High Commission Canberra, Australia. For services to British foreign policy
- Cheryl Williams, Team Leader, Foreign, Commonwealth and Development Office. For services to British foreign policy

=== Royal Red Cross ===
==== Members of the Royal Red Cross (RRC) ====
- Lieutenant Colonel Margaret-Ann Hodge, Queen Alexandra's Royal Army Nursing Corps
- Group Captain Fionnuala Mary Bradley

==== Associate of the Royal Red Cross (ARRC) ====
- Chief Petty Officer Kelly Jane Brechany, Queen Alexandra's Royal Naval Nursing services
- Chief Petty Officer Carrie Stuart, Queen Alexandra's Royal Naval Nursing services
- Major Tracey Ann Buckingham, Queen Alexandra's Royal Army Nursing Corps
- Staff Sergeant Julie-Anne Fulford, Queen Alexandra's Royal Army Nursing Corps
- Major Debra Louise Harvey, Queen Alexandra's Royal Army Nursing Corps
- Squadron Leader Sherry Louise McBain
- Squadron Leader Elizabeth Frances Paxman
- Sergeant Victoria Lee van Der Wel
- Squadron Leader Christopher John Wells

=== British Empire Medal (BEM) ===
Civil

- Mohammed Zoinul Abidin. Head of Universal services, London Borough of Barking and Dagenham. For services to public Libraries (London, Greater London)
- Jack Rowan Abrey. Member Support Officer, Scouts. For services to Young People and to Charity during COVID-19 (London, Greater London)
- Nadia Nasreen Ahmed. Lately Community Champion, Morrisons. For services to the community in Edinburgh (Edinburgh, City of Edinburgh)
- Darren William Aitchison. For services to the community in Felixstowe, Suffolk during COVID-19 (Felixstowe, Suffolk)
- Timothy James Aldous. Works Supervisor, Forestry England. For services to Forestry (Kettering, Northamptonshire)
- Linda June Alexander. For services to Patient Care and Alternative Workforce Solutions in NHS. Wales (Cardiff, South Glamorgan)
- Siraj Ali. For services to the community in Coventry, West Midlands particularly during COVID-19 (Coventry, West Midlands)
- Muhammad Kamil Ali. Volunteer Tutor, BPCD. Trust, Luton. For services to Education (Luton, Bedfordshire)
- Lianne Jayne Al-Khaldi. For services to the community in Stafford during COVID-19 (Stafford, Staffordshire)
- Dominique Léonie Claude Allen. Benevolent Fund Treasurer, Leicestershire Police. For services to Policing (Earl Shilton, Leicestershire)
- Mohmed Siddik Habiba Alli. Volunteer, Redbridge COVID-19 Mutual Aid. For services to the community in the London Borough of Redbridge during COVID-19 (London, Greater London)
- David Jonathon Allman. For services to the NHS. and to the community in Cheshire, Shropshire and Staffordshire, particularly during COVID-19 (Ellesmere Port, Cheshire)
- Nina Kayoko Andersen. For services to the community in Wandsworth, London during COVID-19 (London, Greater London)
- Joanna Hilary Anderson. For services to the community in Winslow, Buckinghamshire particularly during COVID-19 (Winslow, Buckinghamshire)
- Laura Frances Argyle. For services to the community in Woodford, London Borough of Redbridge during COVID-19 (London, Greater London)
- Samuel Wesley Atchison. Lately Editor, Tyrone Constitution and Strabane Weekly News. For services to Journalism and the community in County Tyrone (Omagh, County Tyrone)
- Liesje Maria Athwal. (Lee Athwal) For services to the community in Tonbridge, Kent, particularly during COVID-19 (Tonbridge, Kent)
- Hardip Singh Atwal. For charitable service in Annan, Dumfries and Galloway (Annan, Dumfries)
- Caroline Austen. For services to the community in East Sussex particularly during COVID-19 (Lewes, East Sussex)
- Julia Baines. Teaching Assistant, St. Margaret Clitherow Catholic Primary School, Bracknell. For services to Education for People with Special Educational Needs and Disabilities (Bracknell, Berkshire)
- Stuart Eric Ballard. Deputy County Commissioner, Avon County Scouts. For services to Young People (Keynsham, Somerset)
- Roy William Bate. Life President, Forget-Me-Not Buddies. For services to People with Dementia and their Carers in Greater Manchester (Hyde, Greater Manchester)
- Graeme William Baxter, Golf artist/publisher. For services to Golf and to Tourism in Scotland
- Julia Evelyn Baxter. Personal Secretary to Commander, 16 Air Assault Brigade. For services to the Army and the community in Colchester, Essex (Colchester, Essex)
- Jacqueline Baxter. Environmental Campaigns Officer, London Borough of Bromley. For services to the community in Bromley, Kent during COVID-19 (London, Greater London)
- Kathryn Mary Beale. For services to the communities of Dudley and Sandwell, West Midlands, particularly during COVID-19 (Bilston, West Midlands)
- Margaret Ellen Beattie. (Helen Beattie) For services to the Girls' Brigade in Northern Ireland (Bangor, County Down)
- Emma Beauchamp. Chair, North East Young Apprenticeship Ambassador Network. For services to Apprenticeships and Skills (Gateshead, Tyne and Wear)
- Gerald Stanley Beaumont. For services to People with Disabilities in Wales (Usk, Monmouthshire)
- Johanna Belton. For services to the community in Messingham, North Lincolnshire during COVID-19 (Scunthorpe, Lincolnshire)
- Freddy Berdach. For services to Holocaust Education and Awareness (London, Greater London)
- Ellen Jane Blacker. For services to the community in Malmesbury and Chippenham, Wiltshire particularly during COVID-19 (Chippenham, Wiltshire)
- Angela Patricia Blower. Lately Catering Manager, Middlesbrough Council, North Yorkshire. For services to Education (Cleveland & Redcar, North Yorkshire)
- Dorothy Mary Bone. Honorary Secretary, Emsworth Maritime and Historical Trust and Honorary Minute Secretary, Emsworth Stroke Club. For voluntary services to the community in Emsworth, Hampshire (Emsworth, Hampshire)
- Paul Edward Booker. Special Superintendent, Suffolk Constabulary. For services to Policing (Lowestoft, Suffolk)
- Jane Boulton. Manager, Springboard Specialist Pre-school, Chippenham, Wiltshire. For services to Education (Chippenham, Wiltshire)
- Simon Bradshaw. Editor, Henley Standard. For services to the community in Henley on Thames, during COVID-19 (Reading, Berkshire)
- John Bramham. Chair, The Friends of Old Christ Church, Waterloo, Merseyside. For services to Community Heritage (Blundellsands, Merseyside)
- Patricia Elizabeth Bridge. Quaker Chaplain, HM. Prison Wandsworth. For services to Prisoners (London, Greater London)
- Paul Bromage. For services to the community in Salisbury, Wiltshire particularly during COVID-19 (Salisbury, Wiltshire)
- Terence Michael Bromilow. Chair, Marshall Milton Keynes Athletics Club. For services to Athletics in Buckinghamshire (Milton Keynes, Buckinghamshire)
- Anthony Henry Brooking. Lately Police Staff, Metropolitan Police service. For services to Policing and to Physical and Mental Wellbeing (London, Greater London)
- Christopher William Gibson Brown. For services to the community in Cholesbury-cum-St Leonards, Buckinghamshire, particularly during COVID-19 (Chesham, Buckinghamshire)
- Donald Maynard Brown. Technology Volunteer. For voluntary service to Blind and Visually-Impaired People (Coventry, West Midlands)
- Anne Brown. (Monica Anne Collins) Counsellor, Women's Aid, Belfast. For services to Victims of Domestic Violence (Belfast, Belfast)
- Lieselotte Gerta Lily Bruml. For services to Holocaust Education and Awareness (London, Greater London)
- Charlene Joanne Burns. Co-founder and Director, Real Education Empowering Lives. For services to Social Inclusion and to the community in Oldham, Greater Manchester, during COVID-19 (Oldham, Greater Manchester)
- Malcolm Keith Burwood. For services to the community in East Sussex (Haywards Heath, West Sussex)
- Karen Bussooa. Lately End of Life Care Facilitator, University Hospitals of Derby and Burton NHS. Foundation Trust. For services to End of Life Care (Derby, Derbyshire)
- Charlotte Isabel Hurley Butter. Co-founder, DeliverAid. For services to Frontline Workers and the NHS. during COVID-19 (London, Greater London)
- Ruth Anne Caddell. For services to Education and to the community in Markethill, County Armagh (Portadown, County Armagh)
- Lynsey Helen Cargill. For services to the community in Ancrum, Roxburghshire during COVID-19 (Jedburgh, Roxburghshire)
- Genevieve Carnell. For services to the community in Woodford, London Borough of Redbridge during COVID-19 (London, Greater London)
- Stephen Peter Chamberlain. Founder, St Laurence's Larder and Open Kitchen. For services to the community in the London Borough of Brent, particularly during COVID-19 (London, Greater London)
- Jayne Beverley Chapman. Councillor, Tendring District Council. For services to the community in Brightlingsea, Essex particularly during COVID-19 (Brightlingsea, Essex)
- James Johnston Chapman. Charge Hand Porter, Lisburn Health Centre, South Eastern Health and Social Care Trust. For services to Health and Social Care. (Belfast, Belfast)
- Dorothy May Charnley. Shop Manager, RNLI. Blackpool Lifeboat Station. For services to the RNLI. and to Charity (Blackpool, Lancashire)
- Alison Christie. For services to the Aberdeen City Council Children's Panel (Aberdeen, City of Aberdeen)
- Darren Peter Clark, First Secretary, Operational Delivery Manager, British Embassy Yangon, Myanmar. For services to British foreign policy
- Sarah Karis Clay. For services to the community in the London Borough of Kingston-upon-Thames during COVID-19 (West Molesey, Surrey)
- Joan Isobel Clements. Administrative Support Officer, Police service of Northern Ireland. For services to Policing and the Community in Northern Ireland (Belfast, Belfast)
- Jonathan James Turner Cobb. For services to the community in Miserden, Gloucestershire during COVID-19 (Stroud, Gloucestershire)
- Patrick John Colbourne. For services to Young People through Cricket and Charity (Bath, Somerset)
- Natalie Claire Coleman, Director, National Gallery of the Cayman Islands. For services to Arts and Culture in the Cayman Islands and wider region
- Bianca Collins, Desk Officer, Foreign, Commonwealth and Development Office. For services to British foreign policy
- Susan Collins. For services to the community in Bungay, Suffolk during COVID-19 (Bungay, Suffolk)
- Joanne Mary Conchie. For services to the community in Cheshire during COVID-19 (Winsford, Cheshire)
- Rose Cook-Monk. For services to the community in Dudley, West Midlands (Dudley, West Midlands)
- Simon Hugh Jackson Coombe. For services to the community in Limpley Stoke, Wiltshire during COVID-19 (Limpley Stoke, Wiltshire)
- Marion Elizabeth Copeland. Infant Feeding Specialist Midwife, North Bristol NHS. Trust. For services to Infant Feeding and Postnatal Care (Bristol, City of Bristol)
- Patricia Ann Court. For services to the community in Staffordshire (Worcester, Worcestershire)
- Ian Cunningham Crawford. President, Bristol Youth Cricket League and Youth Coordinator, Stapleton Cricket Club. For services to Sport and the community in Bristol (Bristol, City of Bristol)
- Stephen Crawford. Founder, Coaching for Christ. For services to Young People in County Antrim (Ballymena, County Antrim)
- Gillian Isabel Creed. For services to fundraising and to the community in Swaffham, Norfolk (Norwich, Norfolk)
- Claire Louise Curran. For services to Mental Health in Northern Ireland (Dundonald, County Down)
- Lorna Anne Moore Dane. For services to Girlguiding and to the community in Northern Ireland (Enniskillen, County Fermanagh)
- Sulakhan Singh Dard. Ambassador, British Heart Foundation. For services to Healthcare in the Sikh Community (Leicester, Leicestershire)
- Reverend Wayne Matthew Davies. For services to the community in Ludlow, Shropshire, particularly during COVID-19 (Ludlow, Shropshire)
- Lesley Davies. Senior Development Manager, Communities, Sefton Library service. For services to public Libraries and to the community in Sefton, Merseyside (Liverpool, Merseyside)
- Maureen Flora Davies. For voluntary and public service in Anglesey (Holyhead, Anglesey)
- Kerry Davis. Team Leader, Ministry of Defence. For services to Defence (London, Greater London)
- Sharron De Abreu Faria. Director of Art and Hospitality, The Right to Work CIC. For services to Supported Volunteers and Artists with Learning Disabilities particularly during COVID-19 (Clanfield, Hampshire)
- Rose Ann Deakin. (Rose Morgan) Community Champion, Morrisons Peckham. For services to the community in Peckham, London Borough of Southwark (London, Greater London)
- Peter Edward Deck. For services to the community in Pewsey, Wiltshire (Pewsey, Wiltshire)
- Rabinder Singh Dhami. Prevention Manager, Shropshire Fire & Rescue service. For services to Fire and Rescue (Telford, Shropshire)
- Jill Diprose. Founder, Activities Interests Music Support (A.I.M.S.) For services to Families of Children with Special Needs in Dawlish, Devon (Dawlish, Devon)
- Anne Elizabeth Doherty. For services to Yorkhill Children's Hospital and to the Royal Hospital for Children, Glasgow (Glasgow, City of Glasgow)
- Emily Doorbar. Customer service Manager, Staffordshire County Council. For public service during COVID-19 (Caverswall, Staffordshire)
- Maureen Dunseath. Driver, Northern Ireland Ambulance service. For Voluntary service (Londonderry, City of Londonderry)
- Linda May Dutaut. For services to the community in Maldon, Essex, particularly during COVID-19 (Maldon, Essex)
- Eliza Jane Ecclestone. For services to the community in Sevenoaks, Kent during COVID-19 (Sevenoaks, Kent)
- Beverley Edwards. Chair, Metropolitan Women Police Association. For services to Women in Policing (Slough, Berkshire)
- Donald Graham Elliott. Special Constable, Merseyside Police. For services to Policing and to the community in The Wirral (Hoylake, Merseyside)
- Stephen Gordon Emery. Volunteer, Coxswain and Trustee, Hamble Lifeboat. For services to Maritime Safety (Havant, Hampshire)
- Pamela Margaret Essler. Lay Chair, Individual Funding Requests Panel, Bradford District and Craven Clinical Commissioning Group. For services to the NHS. (Keighley, West Yorkshire)
- Edward Gordon Charles Evans. For services to the community in Wiltshire (Warminster, Wiltshire)
- Marlene Ann Ferris. Women's Refuge Manager, Newark Women's Aid. For services to Victims of Domestic Abuse (Lowdham, Nottinghamshire)
- Neil John Fleming. IT Specialist, BAE Systems. For services to the community in Ulverston, Cumbria during COVID-19 (Lindal, Cumbria)
- Thomas Edward Fletcher. Area Contract Manager, Everyone Active. For services to the community in the London Borough of Havering during COVID-19 (London, Greater London)
- Kiran Flynn. Social Worker, Frontline. For services to Children and Families during Covid - 19 (London, Greater London)
- Reverend Archibald Murdoch Ford. For services to the community in Lochwinnoch, Renfrewshire (Troon, Ayrshire and Arran)
- David Forshaw. Deputy Launching Authority, Press Officer, RNLI, Lytham St Anne's Lifeboat Station. For services to the RNLI. and to Charity (Lytham St Annes, Lancashire)
- Elaine Forsyth. For services to Education in Surrey (Betchworth, Surrey)
- Jeremy Fox. For services to the community in Littlehampton, West Sussex (Patching, West Sussex)
- Margery Diane Foxley. For services to the community in Seaview, Isle of Wight (Seaview, Isle of Wight)
- Joseph Freedman. For services to the Jewish community in Glasgow during COVID-19 (Newton Mearns, Renfrewshire)
- Angela Joy French, Former Chair, The Women's Royal Voluntary service, Portugal. For services to Charity in Portugal
- Leslie David Fry. For voluntary service to the community in Dorchester and West Dorset (Dorchester, Dorset)
- Melanie Furness. For services to Fundraising and to the community in Thetford, Norfolk (Thetford, Norfolk)
- Sarah Gardner. Founder, Serving our Superheroes. For services to the community in the London Borough of Hillingdon, during COVID-19 (London, Greater London)
- Rochelle Sharon Gardner. Community Champion, Morrisons. For services to the community in Manchester (Manchester, Greater Manchester)
- Johanna Mary Geddes. For services to the Boys' Brigade and the community in Thurso, Caithness (Thurso, Caithness)
- Rosemary Margaret George. For services to the community in Leighton Buzzard, Bedfordshire during COVID-19 (Leighton Buzzard, Bedfordshire)
- Averil Selina Gibbins. Lately School Cleaner, Whitehouse Community Primary School, Ipswich. For services to Education (Ipswich, Suffolk)
- Jonathan Gibson. For services to Cricket Coaching and to Youth Development (Wigton, Cumbria)
- Alan Gibson. Fundraiser, Fire Fighters Charity. For services to Charity and to the community in County Durham (Burnhope, County Durham)
- Davina Mary Macinnes Gillies. For services to Marie Curie Cancer Care and the Community in Inverness and Ross-shire (North Kessock, Ross and Cromarty)
- Keith Glover. Planning and Recruitment Lead, North West and North Central Area, Work and Health services, Department for Work and Pensions. For services to Sport and to the Delivery of public services (Liverpool, Merseyside)
- Reverend Rumley Myles Godfrey. For services to the community in Oxfordshire (Wallingford, Oxfordshire)
- Clare Louise Gollop. Director, West Midlands Violence Reduction Unit. For services to Victims of Modern Slavery and to Vulnerable Young People (Exeter, Devon)
- Julie Goodwin. (Julie Harrison) Sergeant, West Midlands Police. For services to Policing (Coventry, West Midlands)
- Dr. Mary Gordon-Mcbride. For services to the community in Enniskillen (Enniskillen, County Fermanagh)
- John Douglas Gorée. Lately Operations Manager, Ambient Support. For services to disabled people in Lincolnshire and the Midlands (Spalding, Lincolnshire)
- Bobbie Rebecca Graham. For services to the community in Woodford, London Borough of Redbridge during COVID-19 (London, Greater London)
- Cornel Grant. Bus Driver, Stagecoach. For services to the community in Greater Manchester (Manchester, Greater Manchester)
- Maxine Carol Grimshaw. For services to Frontline Workers in Greater Manchester during COVID-19 (Bury, Greater Manchester)
- Michael Peter Groves, Member of the Cyprus Residency Support Group. For services to the British Community in Cyprus
- Pamela Irene Groves, Member of the Cyprus Residency Support Group. For services to the British Community in Cyprus
- Peter Nicholas Gysin. Lately Senior Policy Adviser, Department for Business, Energy and Industrial Strategy. For services to Energy Policy and International Trade (London, Greater London)
- Adill Hadi. Senior Youth Worker, Concord Youth Centre, Yardley, Birmingham. For services to Vulnerable Young People during COVID-19 (Birmingham, West Midlands)
- Eileen Ross Haggarty. For services to Education and to the community in Dundee during COVID-19 (Dundee, City of Dundee)
- Meena Hanspal. Charity Volunteer, Guru Nanak's Mission and Vegetarian Rasoi. For services to the Sikh community in Nottingham (Nottingham, Nottinghamshire)
- Carolyn June Harbourne. Complaints Officer, Office of the public Guardian. For services to Volunteering (Birmingham, West Midlands)
- Tyrone Harold. For services to the community in Great Yarmouth, Norfolk during COVID-19 (Great Yarmouth, Norfolk)
- Damieon Hartley-Pickles. Police Constable, Greater Manchester Police. For services to Policing (Manchester, Greater Manchester)
- Jason Charles Hawkes. For services to the community in Chard, Somerset during COVID-19 (Chard, Somerset)
- Hayley Hayle. For services to Postnatal Care in Oxford, Oxfordshire during COVID-19 (Oxford, Oxfordshire)
- Charlotte Elizabeth Adair Hellyer. For services to Children and Young People in Redhill, Surrey (Redhill, Surrey)
- Nicholas Hempleman. For services to the community in Horsham, West Sussex particularly during COVID-19 (Horsham, West Sussex)
- Alexandra Mary Hennessy, Diary Manager to the Minister of State, Foreign, Commonwealth and Development Office. For services to British foreign policy
- Nesta Hill. For charitable services to the community in Bishops Castle, Shropshire (Bishops Castle, Shropshire)
- Dorothy Cynthia Hindley. For services to the community in Barnsley, South Yorkshire (Barnsley, South Yorkshire)
- Professor Benjamin Charles Hodgkinson. Head of Mechanical Engineering, Mercedes AMG. HPP. For services to the NHS. during COVID-19 (Kettering, Northamptonshire)
- Anthony Keith Holdom. Company Manager and artistic director, The Misfits Theatre Company. For services to Adults with Learning Disabilities (Downend, Gloucestershire)
- Richard James Holliday. Learning and Development Manager, TransPennine Express. For services to Mental Health in West Yorkshire (Huddersfield, West Yorkshire)
- Var Ashe Houston. For services to Holocaust Remembrance (Guildford, Surrey)
- Roger William Howard. Volunteer Groundskeeper, Meadlands Primary School, London. For services to Education and to the Environment (London, Greater London)
- Dr. Ian Clive Humphreys. Chief Executive, Keep Northern Ireland Beautiful. For services to the Environment (Larne, County Antrim)
- Lisa Jayne Hunter. For services to the community in Maidenhead, Berkshire during COVID-19 (Maidenhead, Berkshire)
- Frances Rebecca Hunter. For services to the community in Irvinestown, County Fermanagh, Northern Ireland (Kesh, County Fermanagh)
- Akthar Hussain. Systems Engineer, Network Rail. For services to Diversity and Inclusion (London, Greater London)
- Nigel Huxtable. Lately Assistant General Secretary, Royal Naval Association. For services to Royal Navy Veterans (Southsea, Hampshire)
- Nikki Anne Iles. For services to Music (Bedford, Bedfordshire)
- Mohammed Jakir Ahmed Jabbar. Customer services Front Line Manager, HM. Revenue and Customs. For services to HMRC. and to Diversity and Inclusion (Cardiff, South Glamorgan)
- Alice India Jackson. For services to the community in Lower Chute, Hampshire during COVID-19 (Andover, Hampshire)
- Suzy Jakeman. For services to the London Community Kitchen, particularly during COVID-19 (London, Greater London)
- Vincent Victor James. Employee, Network Rail. For services to Prisoners during COVID-19 (Wellingborough, Northamptonshire)
- Rebecca Jayne Jefferies. Head, Human Resources and Learning and Development, Royal Berkshire Fire & Rescue service. For services to Fire and Rescue (Tilehurst, Berkshire)
- Richard Alun Jenkins. Councillor, Wrexham Council. For political and public service (Wrexham, Clwyd)
- Kim Johnson. Arts Education Consultant, Derbyshire County Council Virtual School. For services to the Arts, to Education and to Young People (Wirksworth, Derbyshire)
- William James Edwin Johnston. Branch Manager, Omagh, Libraries Northern Ireland. For services to public Libraries (Omagh, County Tyrone)
- Rosalie Veronica Jones. For services to the community in Birmingham (Birmingham, West Midlands)
- Emma Jones. For services to the community in Plymouth during COVID-19 (Plymouth, Devon)
- Ceri Anne Jones. Lead Community Diabetes Specialist Nurse, Cwm Taf Morganwg University Health Board. For services to Diabetes Care (Rhondda, Mid Glamorgan)
- Kenneth Ian Jones. For services to Sport and Charity (Strabane, County Tyrone)
- Franstine Cassandra Blandel Jones. Volunteer and Trustee, National Black Police Association. For services to Black, Asian and Minority Ethnic communities in Suffolk (Kesgrave, Suffolk)
- Munier Jussab. Lately Commercial Manager, Home Office. For services to Contract Management and to the community in South London (London, Greater London)
- Hamaad Ali Karim. Student Mentor. For voluntary service to Students and the Wider Community during COVID-19 (Marlow, Buckinghamshire)
- Hayley Amanda Keegan. Policy Advisor, Department of Health and Social Care. For services to the COVID-19 Response (London, Greater London)
- Mary Elizabeth Kenyon. Chair, East of Scotland Region, SSAFA. For voluntary service to ex-service Personnel and to the community in Eastern Scotland (Stirling, Stirling and Falkirk)
- Gladys Kerr. For services to the Boys' Brigade and the community in Craigavon, Northern Ireland (Craigavon, County Armagh)
- Harry Kessler. For services to Holocaust Education and Awareness (Southport, Merseyside)
- Jahungir Khan. For services to the community in the London Borough of Waltham Forest, particularly during COVID-19 (Londone, Greater London)
- Ranjeet Khare. For services to the community in Woodford, London Borough of Redbridge during COVID-19 (London, Greater London)
- Thomas Matthew John Kimnell. Lately Police Constable, Surrey Police. For services to Policing and Youth Engagement in Surrey Heath (Salisbury, Wiltshire)
- Michael George King. For services to the Ethiopia Hope charity (Southminster, Essex)
- Elizabeth Sandra Kinnear. Health, Safety and Sustainability Advisor. University of Edinburgh. For services to the Environment and to Charity (Edinburgh, City of Edinburgh)
- Isobel Shirley Knowles. For services to the community in Moseley, Birmingham particularly during COVID-19 (Birmingham, West Midlands)
- Desmond Lally. For voluntary and charitable service to the community in Brecon (Brecon, Powys)
- Hannah Jane Lansdowne. For services to the community in Painswick, Gloucestershire during COVID-19 (Stroud, Gloucestershire)
- Peter Hunter Law. For voluntary services to Advanced Higher Physics Education in Glasgow (Milngavie, Dunbartonshire)
- Cathryn Joanne Legg. For services to the community in Luton, Bedfordshire particularly during COVID-19. (Dunstable, Bedfordshire)
- Elizabeth Lenten. For services to Music in Lincolnshire (Spalding, Lincolnshire)
- Giuseppe Lettieri. Co-founder, Family Based Solutions. For services to Vulnerable Families and Children in the London Borough of Barnet (London, Greater London)
- Anne-Marie Lever. For services to Holocaust Education and Awareness (London, Greater London)
- Ethel Elizabeth Liggett. For services to the community in County Tyrone and to Nursing in Northern Ireland (Dungannon, County Tyrone)
- Carol Mary Lister. For services to the community in Cheddington, Buckinghamshire particularly during COVID-19 (Cheddington, Buckinghamshire)
- Irena Suzanne Litton. For services to the community in Leonard Stanley, Gloucestershire, particularly during COVID-19 (Stonehouse, Gloucestershire)
- Ian Michael Lloyd. Strategic Manager, Isle of Wight Council. For services to the community in the Isle of Wight during COVID-19 (Ryde, Isle of Wight)
- Gerard Lynch. For services to Education and to the community in County Londonderry (Claudy, County Londonderry)
- Mary Lyttle. Enforcement of Judgments Office, Northern Ireland Courts and Tribunals service. For public and Charitable services (Carryduff, County Down)
- Ian Macpherson. Music Tutor, Percussive Edge, Harrogate. For services to Education (Harrogate, North Yorkshire)
- Marion Elizabeth Maidment. English Teacher, Ferndown Upper School. For services to Education (Southbourne, Dorset)
- Rajesh Makwana. Director, Sufra NW. London. For services to the community in the London Borough of Brent, particularly during COVID-19 (London, Greater London)
- Andrea Malam. Lately Officer, National Crime Agency. For services to Diversity and Inclusion in Law Enforcement (London, Greater London)
- Lillian Malama. Offender Manager Probation service Learner, National Probation service Nottingham. For services to Volunteering and to the Rehabilitation of Offenders (Nottingham, Nottinghamshire)
- Mukesh Malhotra. For services to the community in the London Borough of Hounslow, particularly during COVID-19 (London, Greater London)
- Maurice Francis Malone. Chief Executive Officer, Birmingham Irish Association. For services to the Irish Community in Birmingham during COVID-19 (Castle Bromwich, Warwickshire)
- Dr. John Caleb Deverell Fortescue Manley. Co-founder, DeliverAid. For services to Frontline Workers and the NHS. during COVID-19 (London, Greater London)
- Mary Elizabeth Mather. For services to the community in St Helens, Merseyside (St Helens, Merseyside)
- Amanda Jane Mathews. Senior Adviser, Natural England. For public service during COVID-19 (Tisbury, Wiltshire)
- Janice Mathias. Custody Visitor, West Midlands Police. For voluntary service to the Custody Visitor Scheme (Coventry, West Midlands)
- Tina Carol May. For services to the community in North Wiltshire (Chippenham, Wiltshire)
- Sandra Elizabeth May, Pro-Consul, British Embassy Tehran, Iran. For services to British nationals overseas
- Mihaela Mazilu. (Milla Mazilu) Volunteer, Royal Academy of Engineering and Network Rail Employee. For services to the COVID-19 Response (Cheltenham, Gloucestershire)
- Mary Elizabeth Joan Mcauley. Assistant, Peter Pan Playgroup. For services to Pre-School Education (Trillick, County Tyrone)
- George Ivor Mccandless. For services to Golf in Northern Ireland (Lisburn, County Antrim)
- Bronagh Mcdonnell. Bus Driver and Driver Mentor. For services to public Transport and to Community Engagement in Northern Ireland (Newry, County Armagh)
- William Mcfarland. For services to Music in County Antrim (Ballymena, County Antrim)
- James Samuel Mcilroy. For services to Athletics in Northern Ireland (Larne, County Antrim)
- Mary Louise Mcilwee. (Mary Louise Goodman) For services to the Mental and Physical Wellbeing of Vulnerable People in County Antrim (Randalstown, County Antrim)
- Terence Adams Mckeag. For services to Agriculture and to Equestrian Sport in Northern Ireland (Bangor, County Down)
- Catherine Mckee. Senior Playgroup and Family Project Manager. For services to Children and Families in Belfast (Belfast, Belfast)
- Sharon Marie Mclaughlin. Business Support Manager, Community and Children's services department, City of London Corporation. For services to the community in the City of London (Chelmsford, Essex)
- Robert John Ivor Mcmullan. Head of Parks, Antrim and Newtownabbey Borough Council. For public service during COVID-19 (Ballymena, County Antrim)
- Amy Nicole Meek. Co-founder, Kids Against Plastic. For voluntary service to the Natural Environment (Nottingham, Nottinghamshire)
- Ella Jo Meek. Co-founder, Kids Against Plastic. For voluntary service to the Natural Environment (Nottingham, Nottinghamshire)
- Madeleine Menezes. For services to Young People in the community of Spelthorne, Surrey during COVID-19 (Walton-on-Thames, Surrey)
- Mohammed Afruz Miah. For services to Charitable Fundraising and to the community in Oldham during COVID-19 (Oldham, Greater Manchester)
- Gerald Victor Millington. For services to Local History in Devon and Hertfordshire (Budleigh Salterton, Devon)
- Saira Begum Mir. For services to the community in the London Borough of Waltham Forest, particularly during COVID-19 (London, Greater London)
- Katrina Moffat. Leader, Girlguiding UK. For services to Young People in North Tyneside (Newcastle Upon Tyne, Tyne and Wear)
- Kathleen Moore. Lead Supervisor, Environmental Cleanliness Team, Belfast City Hospital. For services to Healthcare during COVID-19 (Belfast, Belfast)
- Nicola Ann Morris. For services to the community in the London Borough of Camden, particularly during COVID-19 (Wymondham, Norfolk)
- Ian Derek Mountford. For services to the community in Stoke-on-Trent, Staffordshire, particularly during COVID-19 (Packmoor, Staffordshire)
- Nigel Patrick Mudd. For services to the community in Sheffield, South Yorkshire, particularly during COVID-19 (Sheffield, South Yorkshire)
- Marjory Elizabeth Mulligan. For services to Nursing and to Charity in Dungannon and South Tyrone (Ballygawley, County Tyrone)
- Roderick John Munro. Community Impact Team Leader, Sleaford New Life Church. For services to Vulnerable People in Lincolnshire (Lincoln, Lincolnshire)
- Debrah Marie Murdoch. For services to the community in Balmaclellan, Dumfries and Galloway (Balmaclellan, Kirkcudbrightshire)
- Joanne Marie Murphy. For services to the community in Chalgrove, Oxfordshire, particularly during COVID-19 (Oxford, Oxfordshire)
- Paula Murray. Group Support Manager, Leicestershire County Council. For services to the Highway's during COVID-19 (Leicester, Leicestershire)
- Dominic Crosby Rollo Myers, lately chief executive officer, Enhance Group and chairman of the board, British School, Sultanate of Oman. For services to British Education in Oman
- Gita Natarajan. For services to the community in Rugby, Warwickshire (Rugby, Warwickshire)
- Andrew Naylor. Fisheries Enforcement Officer, Environment Agency. For services to Fisheries Protection (Darlington, County Durham)
- David Peter Newall. Manager, Brushstrokes. For services to Asylum Seekers, Refugees and Migrants (Crewe, Cheshire)
- Shaun Newton. For services to the community in Hetton-le-Hole, Tyne and Wear, particularly during COVID-19 (Houghton le Spring, Tyne and Wear)
- Rosemary Virginia O'Hagan. For services to the community in Bourne End and Wooburn, Buckinghamshire during COVID-19 (High Wycombe, Buckinghamshire)
- Edward O'Hara. Lately Chair, All Birmingham's Children Charity. For services to Children and Families (Birmingham, West Midlands)
- Joseph Thomas O'Loughlin. For services to Second World War History in County Fermanagh (Belleek, County Fermanagh)
- Lynda Elizabeth Ann Orr. For services to Local Government in Northern Ireland during COVID-19 (Armagh, County Armagh)
- Florence Osborne. For services to Vulnerable People and the community in Harwich, Essex particularly during COVID-19 (Harwich, Essex)
- Reverend Keith Leslie Osmond-Smith. For services to the community in Telford, Shropshire, particularly during COVID-19 (Telford, Shropshire)
- Gillian Margaret Owen-Conway. For services to the community in Buckinghamshire (Great Missenden, Buckinghamshire)
- Susan Owens, Corporate services Manager, Miami Consulate General, Florida, United States of America. For services to the British Consulate General in Miami
- Alexis Page. Head of Safety and Risk, English Heritage. For services to Heritage Safety during COVID-19 (Bristol, City of Bristol)
- Martin Graham Palmer. Manager, Children's Burns Club, Broomfield Hospital, Chelmsford. For voluntary and charitable services to Injured Children and their Families (Billericay, Essex)
- Vinodkumar Mashri Jeram Pankhania. For services to the community in Milton Keynes, Buckinghamshire (Milton Keynes, Buckinghamshire)
- Ruth Panther. For services to the community in Great Linford, Milton Keynes during COVID-19 (Milton Keynes, Buckinghamshire)
- Kathryn Linda Parker. For services to the community in Woolpit, Suffolk during COVID-19 (Bury St Edmunds, Suffolk)
- Pamela Parker, Personal Assistant to HM Ambassador, British Embassy Berlin, Germany. For services to UK/Germany relations
- Adam Guy Philip Parsons. Special Constable, Metropolitan Police service. For services to Policing (Woking, Surrey)
- Toby Rupert Desmond Parsons. Special Police Sergeant, Metropolitan Police service. For services to Policing (London, Greater London)
- Stewart Parsons. Director, Get it Loud in Libraries. For services to the Music and Library Sectors (Wigan, Greater Manchester)
- Nicholas James Partridge. For services to public Libraries (Retford, Nottinghamshire)
- Ragini Patel. For services to the community in Northolt, London Borough of Ealing, particularly during COVID-19 (London, Greater London)
- June Patterson. Cleaning Supervisor, Northern School of Art. For services to Education (Middlesbrough, North Yorkshire)
- Nicola Rachel Perfect. For services to the community in Risley, Bedfordshire particularly during COVID-19 (Risley, Bedfordshire)
- Barbara Mary Peters. Dance Teacher. For services to Dancing (Greetland, West Yorkshire)
- Luke Auri David Pilkington. For services to the community in the London Borough of Kingston upon Thames during COVID-19 (London, Greater London)
- Adria Pittock. Chartered Environmentalist and chair, Suffolk Pride. For services to the Environment and the LGBTQ+ community in Suffolk (Ipswich, Suffolk)
- Lucinda Mary Porter. For services to Girlguiding (Newcastle upon Tyne, Tyne and Wear)
- Ruth Posner. For services to Holocaust Education and Awareness (London, Greater London)
- Maureen Powell. Councillor, Monmouthshire County Council. For political service (Abergavenny, Monmouthshire)
- Lisa Jane Teresa Powis. Founder, Painting Our World in Silver. For services to Tackling Loneliness particularly during COVID-19. (Weybridge, Surrey)
- Helen Elizabeth Price, Charity Volunteer, Hopeful Hearts Guangzhou, China. For services to Charity in China
- Adam Ralph Prince. For services to the community in Burnham, Buckinghamshire during COVID-19 (Rushton Spencer, Staffordshire)
- James Quayle. For services to the community in the City of Westminster particularly during COVID-19 (London, Greater London)
- Pervez Sazzad Qureshi. For services to the Muslim Community in Greater London, particularly during COVID-19 (London, Greater London)
- Atikur Rahman. For services to the community in the London Borough of Tower Hamlets, particularly during COVID-19 (London, Greater London)
- Helen Ramsay. For services to the community in Ancrum, Roxburghshire during COVID-19 (Jedburgh, Roxburgh, Ettrick and Lauderdale)
- Mark Ian Rann. For services to the community in Chesham, Buckinghamshire during COVID-19 (Chesham, Buckinghamshire)
- Lesley Margaret Rawlinson. Laboratory Manager, Imperial College London. For services to the COVID-19 Response (Cambridge, Cambridgeshire)
- Joshua Reeves. Campaigns Support Officer, Leonard Cheshire. For services to People with Disabilities. (Cardiff, South Glamorgn)
- Irene Mary Richards. For voluntary service to Safeguarding and to the community in the London Borough of Enfield (Cambridge, Cambridgeshire)
- Belinda Rickerby. For services to the community in Kirklees, West Yorkshire, particularly during COVID-19 (Kirklees, West Yorkshire)
- Emma Louise Rigby-Nicholson. For services to the community in the London Borough of Enfield particularly during COVID-19 (London, Greater London)
- Claire Susan Ritchie. For services to the community in Sevenoaks, Kent, particularly during COVID-19 (Sevenoaks, Kent)
- Susan Jane Roberts. Volunteer and Trustee, Ross-on-Wye Community Development Trust. For services to the community in Ross-on-Wye, Herefordshire, particularly during COVID-19 (Ross-on-Wye, Herefordshire)
- Sally Jane Robertson. For services to the community in Burghill, Herefordshire (Hereford, Herefordshire)
- Josephine Robson. For services to Foster Care in Tweeddale (Broughton, Tweeddale)
- Tracey Anne Rogers. For services to the community in the London Borough of Waltham Forest particularly during COVID-19 (London, Greater London)
- Kimberley Linda Rogers. Co-founder, Real Education Empowering Lives. For services to Social Inclusion and the community in Oldham, Greater Manchester (Oldham, Greater Manchester)
- Zarah Alia Ross. For services to Young People and the Jewish community in Liverpool during COVID-19 (Liverpool, Merseyside)
- David Stephen Rowe. Founder, Libraries Hacked. For services to public Libraries (Bradford on Avon, Wiltshire)
- Bansari Nilesh Ruparelia. For services to the Hindu Community in Leicestershire (Leicester, Leicestershire)
- Natasha Helen Ruscheinski, Founder, PAW BVI, British Virgin Islands. For services to Animal Welfare
- William James Rutherford. For services to the community in County Londonderry, Northern Ireland during COVID-19 (Eglinton, County Londonderry)
- Khadijah Safari. Chief Executive Officer, Safari MMA. For services to Inclusion and Diversity in Martial Arts (Milton Keynes, Buckinghamshire)
- The Very Reverend Doctor Susan Douglas Salt. For services to the community in the Diocese of Blackburn, Lancashire, particularly during COVID-19 (Preston, Lancashire)
- Alexandra Mary Sanderson. For services to the community in Ash Vale, Surrey particularly during COVID-19 (Ash Vale, Surrey)
- Trevor Wayne Saunders. For services to the community in Great Yarmouth, Norfolk, particularly during COVID-19 (Great Yarmouth, Norfolk)
- Claire Elizabeth Saunders. Frontline Food Retail Worker, The Co-operative Group. For services to Food Retail Worker Safety during COVID-19 (London, Greater London)
- Mairead Angela Savage. Deputy Principal, Forest service, Department of Agriculture, Environment and Rural Affairs. For services to Forestry (Donaghadee, County Down)
- Karen Elizabeth Sawbridge. Chairman, Bridgnorth Rugby Club. For services to Grassroots Rugby Union Football and to the community in Bridgnorth, Shropshire (Bridgnorth, Shropshire)
- Joan Scott. Community Champion, Asda. For services to the community in Pwllheli, North Wales (Pwllheli, Gwynedd)
- Hilary Ann Selby. For services to British Ice Skating (London, Greater London)
- Jennifer Denise Seys. For services to People with Disabilities and to the community in Weymouth, Dorset (Weymouth, Dorset)
- Omair Ali Shah. For services to the community in Barking and Dagenham, Greater London during COVID-19 (London, Greater London)
- Irfan Hussain Shah. For services to Young People and the community in the London Borough of Redbridge, particularly during COVID-19 (London, Greater London)
- Sabir Mahmood Shaikh. For services to the Muslim Community in Palmers Green, London Borough of Enfield, particularly during COVID-19 (London, Greater London)
- Ivan Peter Shaw. For services to Holocaust Education and Awareness (London, Greater London)
- Kelly Ann Short. Co-Lead, Cancer Support Network, Environment Agency. For services to People Affected by Cancer (Gravesend, Kent)
- Aaron Luke Shrive. For services to the COVID-19 response in Leicestershire (Desborough, Northamptonshire)
- Margaret Elizabeth Sidell. For services to the community in Barton-Upon-Humber, Lincolnshire, particularly during COVID-19 (Barton-upon-Humber, Lincolnshire)
- Lindsay Sielski. Crew Manager, Lancashire Fire & Rescue service. For services to Fire and Rescue (Preston, Lancashire)
- Hanina Alice Simon. Manager, Redbridge Schools Library service. For services to Education in the London Borough of Redbridge (London, Greater London)
- Savraj Kaur Singh. For services to the community in the London Borough of Hammersmith and Fulham, particularly during COVID-19 (London, Greater London)
- Mary Elizabeth Sinnamon. For services to Education and the community in County Antrim (Newtownabbey, County Antrim)
- Dr. Darren Smart. For services to public Libraries (Minster on Sea, Kent)
- Kathryn Smith. For services to the COVID-19 response in Stockport, Greater Manchester (Stockport, Greater Manchester)
- Reverend Donald Edgar Smith. For services to the community in Frinton-on-Sea, Essex, particularly during COVID-19 (Frinton on Sea, Essex)
- Brian Stanley Smith. For services to the community in Newton Abbott, Devon, particularly during COVID-19 (Newton Abbot, Devon)
- Thomas Gordon Smyth. Board Member, Northern Ireland Fire & Rescue service. For public service (Ballymoney, County Antrim)
- Bronia Snow. For services to Holocaust Education and Awareness (Esher, Surrey)
- Catherine Margaret Spiller. Deputy Head of Estates, Reserve Forces and Cadets Association Wales. For services to the Reserves and Cadets Forces and to the community in Monmouth (Newport, Gwent)
- George Patrick Spinks. For services to the Reeds Weybridge Rugby Club (Sunninghill, Berkshire)
- Ralph Charles Springett. For services to the community in Maldon, Essex particularly during COVID-19 (Maldon, Essex)
- Lewis Sebastian Stagnetto, Science Teacher, Gibraltar. For services to the Marine Environment in Gibraltar
- Crystal Jayne Stanley. Creator, The Rainbow Trail. For services to the COVID-19 response (Ipswich, Suffolk)
- Sarah Mary Stanton-Nadin. For voluntary services to the community in Sennen and St Just, Cornwall during COVID-19 (Sennen, Cornwall)
- Pamela Susan Gail Steed. For services to the community in Cheddington, Buckinghamshire, particularly during COVID-19 (Cheddington, Buckinghamshire)
- Deborah Linda Stephens. Chief Executive Officer, Fun4Kidz and L30 Community Centre. For services to the community in Sefton, Merseyside, particularly during COVID-19 (Liverpool, Merseyside)
- Elizabeth Jane Stoll. For services to the community in the London Borough of Barnet during COVID-19 (London, Greater London)
- Lorraine Alexis Stone. For services to the community in Moulton, Suffolk (Bury St Edmunds, Suffolk)
- Mark Douglas Ashley Strachan. Founder, The Choir of the Earth. For charitable services to Musicians during COVID-19 (Sherborne, Dorset)
- Maria Sturdy-Morton. For services to the community in the London Borough of Hammersmith and Fulham during COVID-19 (London, Greater London)
- Julian Nicol Sturdy-Morton. For services to the community in the London Borough of Hammersmith and Fulham during COVID-19 (London, Greater London)
- Zoe Sutcliffe. For services to the community in Rochdale, Greater Manchester during COVID-19 (Littleborough, Greater Manchester)
- Michael Charles Sutton. For services to Emergency Response in Hampshire, particularly during COVID-19 (Romsey, Hampshire)
- Timothy Swinyard. Councillor, Swindon Borough Council, Wiltshire. For services to the community in Swindon, particularly during COVID-19 (Swindon, Wiltshire)
- Nicole Marie Taylor. Support Worker, Morning Stars. For services to Care during COVID-19 (Solihull, West Midlands)
- Gulam Muhammad Ismail Teladia. Vice Chair, Birmingham Muslim Burial Council. For services to the community in Birmingham, particularly during COVID-19 (Birmingham, West Midlands)
- Marshall Edwin Llewellyn Thomas. Press Officer, Disability Tennis, Lawn Tennis Association. For services to Disability Tennis (Wirral, Merseyside)
- John Rowland Thompson. For services to the community in Barrow upon Humber, Lincolnshire (Barrow upon Humber, Lincolnshire)
- Sharon Ann Thompson. For services to the community in Thetford, Norfolk, particularly during COVID-19 (Thetford, Norfolk)
- Ellen Cecelia Thompson. For services to Refugees in Chichester, West Sussex, particularly during COVID-19 (Chichester, West Sussex)
- Ann Elizabeth Margaret Thompson. For services to Music and the community in Fintona, County Tyrone (Fintona, County Tyrone)
- Laura Amy Thurlow. Chief Executive, Community Foundation for Surrey. For services to the community in Surrey, particularly during COVID-19 (Leigh-on-Sea, Essex)
- Carol Ann Thursby. For services to the community in Swallowbeck, Lincolnshire (Lincoln, Lincolnshire)
- John Gillespie Tillotson. Detachment Commander, Suffolk Army Cadet Force. For voluntary service to young people in Suffolk (Bury St Edmunds, Suffolk)
- Pamela Dorothy Tolhurst. For services to the community in Gillingham, Kent (Sevenoaks, Kent)
- Alexander James Townsend. For services to education on the Isle of Man (Isle of Man)
- Sarah Anne Townsend. For services to the community in Witney, Oxfordshire, particularly during COVID-19 (Witney, Oxfordshire)
- Sarah-Amie Rebecca Treanor. For services to the community in Solihull and Birmingham, particularly during COVID-19 (Birmingham, West Midlands)
- Beverley Susan Jill Tremayne. Leader, Brownies and Guides, Hanwell, London Borough of Ealing. For services to Girlguiding and Trefoil, particularly during COVID-19 (London, Greater London)
- Caroline Rosemary Topham, Desk Officer, Foreign, Commonwealth and Development Office. For services to British foreign policy
- Michael John Tupper. Patient Expert and Disability Rights Campaigner. For voluntary service to visually impaired people (Clitheroe, Lancashire)
- Sahil Usman. For services to the community in Blackburn, Lancashire during COVID-19 (Blackburn, Lancashire)
- Vikki Van Someren. Co-Owner, The Bike Shed and Co-Creator, Bike Shed Community Response. For services to the COVID-19 response in Hackney, London. (London, Greater London)
- Anthony St.John Van Someren. Co-Owner, The Bike Shed and Co-Creator, Bike Shed Community Response. For services to the COVID-19 response. (London, Greater London)
- Sajeev Vilvarajah. For services to the community in Clayhall, London Borough of Redbridge during COVID-19 (London, Greater London)
- Krystal Ann Joan Vittles. Head of service Delivery, Suffolk Libraries. For services to public Libraries (Stowmarket, Suffolk)
- Andrew Waddison. For services to the community in King's Lynn, Norfolk during COVID-19 (King's Lynn, Norfolk)
- John Craig Wall. Group Manager, Cumbria Fire & Rescue service. For charitable services in Cumbria (Cockermouth, Cumbria)
- Jeremy James Wall. Duty Operations Manager, Transport for London and Special Inspector, City of London Police. For services to transport and public safety (London, Greater London)
- Alison Wallace. For services to the community in County Londonderry during COVID-19 (Londonderry, County Londonderry)
- Gary George Walters. For services to the community of Menheniot, Cornwall (Liskeard, Cornwall)
- Brian Waring, Desk Officer, Foreign, Commonwealth and Development Office. For services to British foreign policy
- Derek Edward John Warren. Warrant Officer, No 1 Welsh Wing, RAF. Air Cadets. For voluntary service to young adults in South Wales (Caldicot, Gwent)
- Janet Patricia Webber. Director of Development, The Mission to Seafarers. For services to women in the International Maritime sector (Sidmouth, Devon)
- Shelagh Mary Weir. For services to sport in the Scottish Borders (Duns, Berwickshire)
- Master Tobias Owain Garbutt Weller. (Tobias Garbutt Weller) For services to charitable fundraising during COVID-19 (Sheffield, South Yorkshire) (Youngest ever recipient of the BEM)
- Cynthia Wells. For services to the community in Pinner, London Borough of Harrow (London, Greater London)
- Julie West. Poppy Appeal Volunteer, Rushden Branch, Royal British Legion. For voluntary service to veterans in Rushden, Northamptonshire (Rushden, Northamptonshire)
- Alison Barbara Whitburn. Community Champion, Morrisons. For services to the community in Littlehampton, West Sussex (Arundel, West Sussex)
- Jennifer Dale Wiggle. Lately services Director, Living Streets. For services to Active Travel (Living Abroad)
- Bryn Owen Williams, Desk Officer, Foreign, Commonwealth and Development Office. For services to British foreign policy.
- Gillian Mary Williams. President, Watford Premier Netball Club. For services to netball in Watford (Watford, Hertfordshire)
- Fiona Carol Williams. Chief Executive Officer, York Explore. For services to libraries (London, Greater London)
- Sarah Williams-Martin. For services to the community in Bath and North East Somerset during COVID-19 (Melksham, Wiltshire)
- David John Wilson. For services to the community in Stevenage, Hertfordshire (Stevenage, Hertfordshire)
- Anne Katherine Wilson. For services to the community in Great Leighs, Essex (Chelmsford, Essex)
- Willam James Crawford Wilson. For services to the community in County Antrim (Larne, County Antrim)
- Lesley Joan Winton. For services to animal welfare (Tranent, East Lothian)
- Dawn Marie Wood. Marine Constable, Essex Police. For services to marine policing and tocConservation (Burnham on Crouch, Essex)
- Nicola Maureen Woodward. For services to the community in Purley on Thames, Berkshire (Reading, Berkshire)
- Max Woosey. For services to fundraising for the North Devon Hospice during COVID-19 (Braunton, Devon)
- Margaret Worsfold. For services to British ice skating (Edinburgh, City of Edinburgh)
- Shirley Ann Wrigglesworth, Welfare Officer/co-ordinator, The British Association of the Alpes Maritimes and the Var. For services to British community in South-East France
- Rosemary Wells Wright. For services to the community in Leicestershire (Hinckley, Leicestershire)
- Andrew Charles Wright. For services to public libraries (Mirfield, West Yorkshire)

=== Queen's Police Medal (QPM) ===
Ribbon bar of the Queen's Police Medal for Distinguished service

England and Wales

- Detective Sergeant Gordon Barclay – Metropolitan Police service
- Inspector Heidi Cara Boutcher – Metropolitan Police service
- Detective Sergeant Robert Stephen Cooper – Wiltshire Police
- Detective Chief Inspector Gail Granville – Metropolitan Police service
- Chief Constable Ben-Julian Harrington – Essex Police
- Detective Inspector Driss Hayoukane – Metropolitan Police service
- Chief Constable Winton Laurence Keenen – Northumbria Police
- Detective Inspector Gail Lilley – Metropolitan Police service
- Deputy Assistant Commissioner Graham McNulty – Metropolitan Police service
- Constable Paul Mitchinson – Northamptonshire Police
- Gareth MacDonald Morgan – lately Chief Constable, Staffordshire Police
- Constable Anne Overton – South Wales Police
- Inspector Jonathan Richard Owen – Avon & Somerset Constabulary
- Inspector Michael Paterson – Metropolitan Police service
- Andrew Duncan Slattery – lately Assistant Chief Constable, Cumbria Constabulary
- Detective Inspector Gary Martin Stephenson – West Yorkshire Police
- Detective Chief Inspector Daniel Stoten – Essex Police
- Detective Sergeant Andrew James Winters – British Transport Police

Scotland

- Chief Inspector Marlene Baillie – Police service of Scotland
- Chief Superintendent Louise Blakelock – Police service of Scotland
- Assistant Chief Constable Judith Heaton – Police service of Scotland

Northern Ireland

- Detective Superintendent Daphne Elaine Duffy – Police service of Northern Ireland
- Detective Superintendent Jason Patrick Murphy – Police service of Northern Ireland
- Inspector Raymond Shaw – Police service of Northern Ireland

Overseas

- Peter Reeve – lately Detective Inspector, Royal Virgin Islands Police

=== Queen's Fire service Medal (QFSM) ===
Ribbon bar of the Queen's Fire service Medal for Distinguished service

England and Wales

- Chief Fire Officer John Andrew Buckley – Nottinghamshire Fire & Rescue service
- Jennifer Elizabeth Griffiths – lately, Group Manager, South Wales Fire & Rescue service
- Group Manager Sally Angeline Hammond – Suffolk Fire & Rescue service
- Chief Fire Officer Justin Johnston – Lancashire Fire & Rescue service
- Deputy Chief Fire Officer Nicholas Searle – Merseyside Fire & Rescue service

=== Queen's Ambulance service Medal (QAM) ===
Ribbon bar of the Queen's Ambulance service Medal for Distinguished service

England and Wales

- Jennifer Margaret Lewis – Operations Manager, Welsh Ambulance service
- Dr. Julian Peter Mark – Executive Medical Director, Yorkshire Ambulance service
- Adrian John Nolan South – Deputy Director of Clinical Care, South Western Ambulance service

Scotland

- Patrick O'Meara – Paramedic, Scottish Ambulance service

=== Queen's Volunteer Reserves Medal (QVRM) ===
Ribbon bar of the Queen's Volunteer Reserves Medal

- Warrant Officer Class 1 Brian Armstrong, VR, Royal Corps of Signals, Army Reserve
- Captain Stephen Thomas Brocklebank, VR, Corps of Royal Engineers, Army Reserve
- Major Andrew Alan Church, VR, Royal Corps of Signals, Army Reserve
- Major Ian David Kemp, TD, VR, The Princess of Wales's Royal Regiment, Army Reserve
- Major Robert Charles Ward, VR, Royal Corps of Signals, Army Reserve

=== Overseas Territories Police Medal (OTPM) ===
Ribbon bar of the Overseas Territories Police Medal

- Loucas Panayiotou, Police Sergeant, Sovereign Base Areas Police, Cyprus. For services to policing, to community safety and to charities in the Sovereign Base Areas.

=== Meritorious service Medal (MSM) ===
- Warrant Officer 1 Air Engineering Technician D. T. Ashhurst
- Warrant Officer 1 Engineering Technician (Weapons Engineering) A. Brown
- Warrant Officer 1 C. R. Brown
- Warrant Officer 1 Engineering Technician (Weapons Engineering (Submarines)) A. H. Buckley
- Warrant Officer 1 P. G. Cooney
- Warrant Officer 1 Air Engineering Technician A. Driver
- Warrant Officer 1 Engineering Technician (Communications and Information Systems) J. P. Edgar
- Chief Petty Officer (Aircrewman) D. A. Griffith
- Band Colour Sergeant K. Harvey
- Warrant Officer 1 Engineering Technician (Weapons Engineering) S. P. Lynch
- Lieutenant J. Maaskant
- Warrant Officer 1 Logistics (Supply Chain) C. D. Morait
- Warrant Officer 1 Engineering Technician (Marine Engineering) S. P. Mugford
- Warrant Officer 2 S. J. Nicholson
- Chief Petty Officer Engineering Technician (Marine Engineering (Submarines)) D. H. P. O'Neill
- Warrant Officer 1Air Engineering Technician S. C. Proctor
- Warrant Officer 2 M. I. Ramsey
- Warrant Officer 1 Air Engineering Technician P. W. Ronaldson
- Warrant Officer 1 Warfare Specialist (Above Water Warfare) J. T. Starkey
- Warrant Officer 1 S. C. Tripp
- Warrant Officer Air Engineering Technician S. M. Walling
- Chief Petty Officer Air Engineering Technician R. Webb
- Warrant Officer Class 2 John Beck Armstrong, Duke of Lancaster's Regiment
- Warrant Officer Class 2 Neil Anthony Baber-Hall, Royal Electrical & Mechanical Engineers
- Warrant Officer Class 1 (now Captain) Maik Malcolm Biggs, Royal Logistic Corps
- Sergeant Alan Michael Boyle, Royal Irish Regiment
- Warrant Officer Class 2 Adrian James Briggs, Royal Lancers (Queen Elizabeth's Own)
- Warrant Officer Class 2 Daniel Buist, Royal Regiment of Scotland
- Warrant Officer Class 1 Russell Clarke, Royal Logistic Corps
- Warrant Officer Class 1 Brian Cowan, Royal Logistic Corps
- Warrant Officer Class 1 Matthew Robert Darcy, Parachute Regiment
- Warrant Officer Class 2 Keith William Eva, Royal Logistic Corps
- Warrant Officer Class 1 (now Captain) Terrance John Ferguson, Adjutant General Corps (Royal Military Police)
- Warrant Officer Class 2 Anthony Scott Frewin, Royal Corps of Signals
- Staff Sergeant Yambahadur Gurung, Queen's Own Gurkha Logistic Regiment
- Warrant Officer Class 1 Tracy Louise Halliday, Royal Logistic Corps
- Warrant Officer Class 1 Duncan McKenna Herries, Royal Corps of Army Music
- Warrant Officer Class 2 Steven Anthony Hicks, Royal Corps of Signals
- Warrant Officer Class 1 Lee Hutchinson, Royal Logistic Corps
- Warrant Officer Class 2 Darren Michael Isle, Royal Logistic Corps
- Warrant Officer Class 1 Dean Jackson-Smith, Royal Logistic Corps
- Warrant Officer Class 1 Paul Andrew Jobling, Royal Army Veterinary Corps
- Warrant Officer Class 1 (now Captain) Peter Keogh, MC, Royal Irish Regiment
- Warrant Officer Class 1 Andrew David Key, The Parachute Regiment
- Warrant Officer Class 2 Sajan Limbu, Royal Gurkha Rifles
- Warrant Officer Class 1 Prawin Malla, Royal Gurkha Rifles
- Warrant Officer Class 2 Shaun Michael McGlynn, Parachute Regiment
- Warrant Officer Class 1 (now Captain) John Stephen Miller, Royal Corps of Signals
- Warrant Officer Class 2 Benjamin Andrew Moseley, Corps of Royal Engineers
- Warrant Officer Class 2 Barrie Anthony O'Connor, Royal Lancers (Queen Elizabeth's Own)
- Warrant Officer Class 1 Karen Ann O'Hara-Styles, MBE, Adjutant General's Corps
- Warrant Officer Class 2 Terence John Michael Omahony-Doran, Royal Corps of Signals
- Warrant Officer Class 1 Terry William O'Neill, Corps of Royal Electrical and Mechanical Engineers
- Warrant Officer Class 1 (now Captain) Roy Anthony Organ, Royal Corps of Signals
- Warrant Officer Class 1 (now Captain) Stuart James Paine, Royal Regiment of Artillery
- Warrant Officer Class 2 Lee Robert Pearn, Adjutant General's Corps
- Warrant Officer Class 1 Lynne Marie Peet, Adjutant General's Corps
- Warrant Officer Class 1 Daniel Phillips, Royal Logistic Corps
- Warrant Officer Class 1 Kamalbahadur Pun Magar, Royal Gurkha Rifles
- Warrant Officer Class 2 Ryan Gerard Robertson, Royal Regiment of Scotland
- Warrant Officer Class 2 Darren Edward Howell Rogers, Royal Regiment of Artillery
- Warrant Officer Class 1 (now Captain) Paul David Scott, Parachute Regiment
- Warrant Officer Class 1 Michael Andrew Secker, Royal Corps of Signals
- Warrant Officer Class 1 Michael David Shepherd, Corps of Royal Electrical and Mechanical Engineers
- Warrant Officer Class 2 Samantha Jane Skyvington, Adjutant General's Corps
- Warrant Officer Class 1 Brian James Slinn, Corps of Royal Electrical and Mechanical Engineers
- Warrant Officer Class 1 Christopher Mark Smillie, Corps of Royal Electrical and Mechanical Engineers
- Warrant Officer Class 1 Paul Henry Joseph Steel, Royal Corps of Signals
- Warrant Officer Class 1 Pandu Tamang, Queen's Gurkha Signals
- Warrant Officer Class 1 Gary John Williams, Welsh Guards
- Warrant Officer Class 1, David Trevor Wright, Royal Corps of Music
- Warrant Officer P. Bass
- Warrant Officer P. Bath
- Warrant Officer M. Chapman
- Warrant Officer A. L. Creeth
- Warrant Officer A. J. Culley
- Warrant Officer M. R. Fraser
- Warrant Officer L. B. Gascoigne-Harding
- Warrant Officer A. Grant
- Master Aircrew P. Granycome
- Warrant Officer J. E. Johnson
- Warrant Officer T. L. Kenworthy
- Master Aircrew A. C. Lyes
- Warrant Officer L. A. Mogford-Banks
- Warrant Officer C. D. Proctor
- Warrant Officer S. Y. Sibley
- Master Aircrew I. M. Strawson
- Warrant Officer A. Talbot
- Warrant Officer J. G. Wilding
- Warrant Officer 2 N. A. Baber-Hall British Army
- Flight Sergeant (now Acting Warrant Officer) R. E. Davies
- Flight Sergeant (now Acting Warrant Officer) C. M. Davison
- Flight Sergeant (now Warrant Officer) G. J. Elliott
- Flight Sergeant M. Clifford
- Flight Sergeant W. J. Conabeare
- Flight Sergeant R. M. Thomas
- Flight Sergeant G. P. Trainor
- Flight Sergeant D. Wilkinson
- Sergeant A. R. Quinlan

== Crown Dependencies ==
=== The Most Excellent Order of the British Empire ===
==== Member of the Order of the British Empire (MBE) ====
Isle of Man

- Colin Leather. For services to the community of Castletown.
- Carol Bernadette Williams. For services to the Isle of Man and to the Royal British Legion.

Guernsey

- Allister Francis de Lisle Carey. For services to sustainable development in Africa.

Jersey

- John Philip Hopley. For services to the community.

=== British Empire Medal (BEM) ===
Isle of Man

- Alexander James Townsend. For services to education on the Isle of Man.

Guernsey

- Stephen Herbert Mauger. For services to Fairtrade on Guernsey.

== Grenada ==
Below are the individuals appointed by Elizabeth II in her right as Queen of Grenada, on advice of Her Majesty's Grenada Ministers.

=== The Most Excellent Order of the British Empire ===
==== Commander of the Order of the British Empire (CBE) ====
- Kirani James. For services to sport.

==== Officer of the Order of the British Empire (OBE) ====
- Dr. George Mitchell. For services to health.

==== Member of the Order of the British Empire (MBE) ====
- Francis Sookram. For services to education.

=== British Empire Medal (BEM) ===
- Joan Joseph. For services to education.

== Solomon Islands ==
Below are the individuals appointed by Elizabeth II in her right as Queen of the Solomon Islands, on advice of Her Majesty's Solomon Island Ministers.

=== The Most Excellent Order of the British Empire ===
==== Officer of the Order of the British Empire (OBE) ====
- Rudgard Fox Irokalani. For services to teaching, to education and to the Anglican Church of Melanesia.
- Billy Titiulu. For services to the justice sector, to commerce and to the government and the people of the Solomon Islands.

==== Member of the Order of the British Empire (MBE) ====
- Rolland Sikua. For services to education and to the Anglican Church of Melanesia.

== Belize ==
Below are the individuals appointed by Elizabeth II in her right as Queen of Belize, on the advice of Her Majesty's Belize Ministers.

=== The Most Excellent Order of the British Empire ===
==== Commander of the Order of the British Empire (CBE) ====
- Sean Craig Feinstein. For services to entrepreneurship and to the community.

==== Officer of the Order of the British Empire (OBE) ====
- The Honourable Madam Justice Michelle Agnes Arana. For services to the field of law and public service.
- Gordon Christopher Roe. For services to entrepreneurship and to the community.

==== Member of the Order of the British Empire (MBE) ====
- Florencia Castillo. For services to the Community.
- Dr. Marcelo Coyi. For services to the Medical Profession and to the Community.
- Joel Robinson. For services to the community.
- The Honourable Elena Smith. For services to education and to trade unionism.

== Saint Christopher and Nevis ==
Below are the individuals appointed by Elizabeth II in her right as Queen of Saint Christopher and Nevis, on advice of Her Majesty's Saint Christopher and Nevis Ministers.

=== The Most Excellent Order of the British Empire ===
==== Officer of the Order of the British Empire (OBE) ====
- Larkland Montgomery Richards. For contribution to the development of tourism.

==== Member of the Order of the British Empire (MBE) ====
- Peter Coury. For services to Business Enterprise.
- Marjorie Morton. For services to governance and public service.
