= Nipple piercing =

Body piercing, centered usually at the base of the nipple

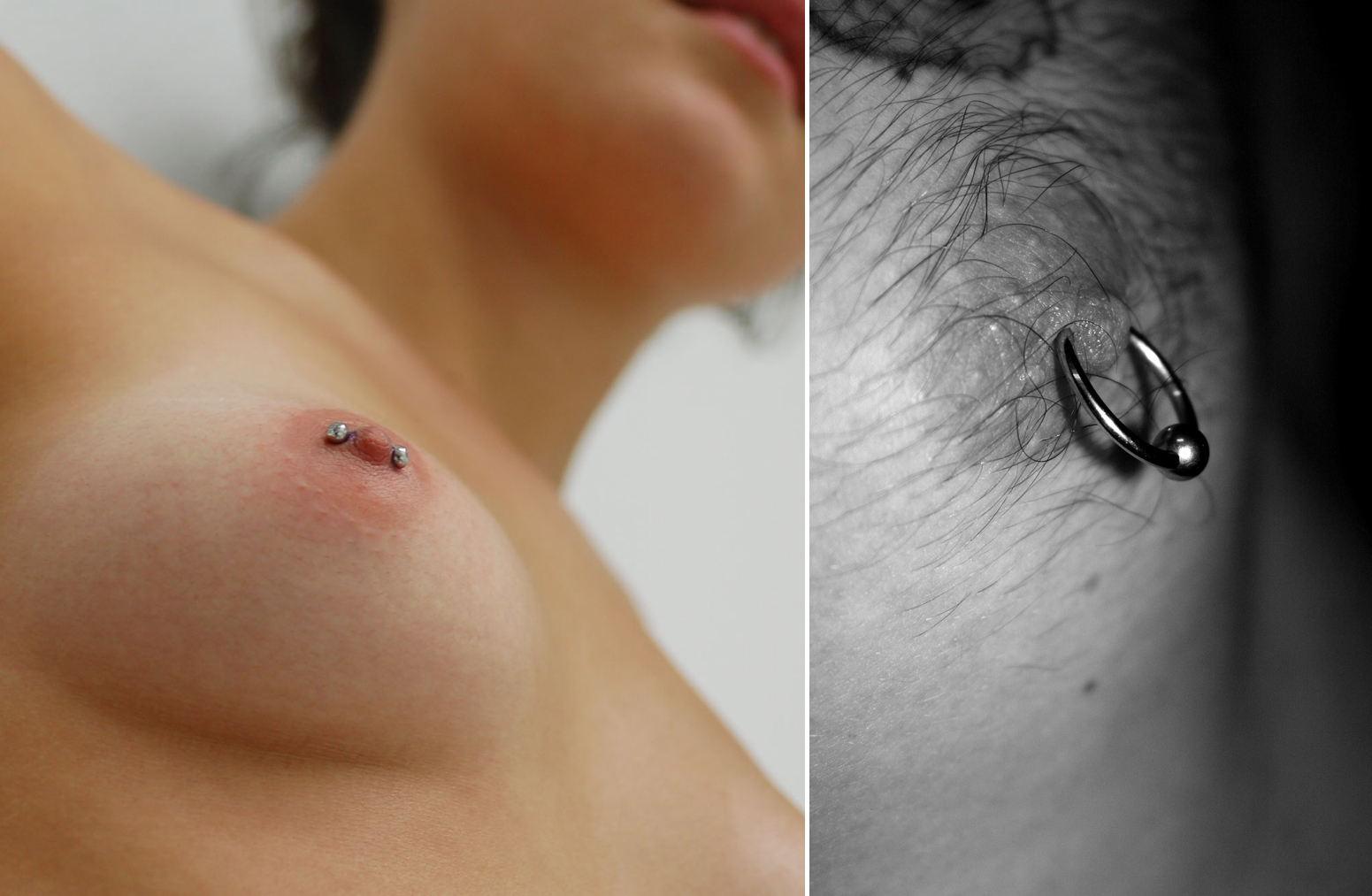
- Woman with barbell (left), man with captive bead ring (right)
- Location: Nipple
- Jewelry: Barbell, captive bead ring
- Healing: 8 to 12 months

A nipple piercing is a type of body piercing, centered usually at the base of the nipple. It can be pierced at any angle but is usually done horizontally or, less often, vertically. It is also possible to place multiple piercings on top of one another.

== History ==
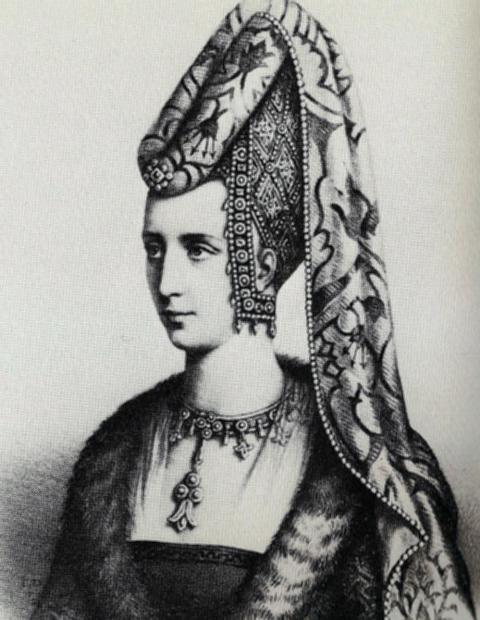
The first reported example of pierced nipples occurred at the court of Isabeau of Bavaria (1370 to 1435), queen consort of France.

The piercing of nipples to attach jewelry has been practiced by various people throughout history. Male nipple piercing was reported to be done by the Karankawa Native Americans. Female nipple piercing is practiced by the Kabyle people in Algeria.

In the western world it potentially dates back to the 14th century. The anthropologist Hans Peter Duerr traces the earliest known practice of female nipple piercing as a fashion statement to the Court of Isabeau of Bavaria (1370 to 1435), queen consort of France, quoting Eduard Fuchs he describes that:

...fashion eventually led to the application of rouge to freely display nipples [...] placing diamond-studded rings or small caps on them, even piercing them and passing gold chains through them decorated with diamonds, possibly to demonstrate the youthful resilience of the bosom.

However, these sources are difficult to verify.

There are also references to a fashion for nipple piercing among society women during the Victorian era around 1890. However, the historian Lesley Hall has commented that these can be traced to a few letters published in the magazine Society during 1899, and can be judged as erotic fantasies rather than descriptions of actual activity.

In the late 1970s, the practice was revived by Jim Ward and it was adopted by the BDSM and leather subcultures of the gay community. During the 1980s and early 1990s, the modern primitive movement embraced nipple piercings among other forms of body modification. With its roots in the West Coast of the United States, the modern primitive movement was intrigued by indigenous, so-called "primitive" cultures and adopted various forms of body modification. The mainstream popularity of nipple piercing is partly due to certain 1990s celebrities such as Tommy Lee, Corey Taylor and Lenny Kravitz who publicly displayed their piercings or said that they had them.

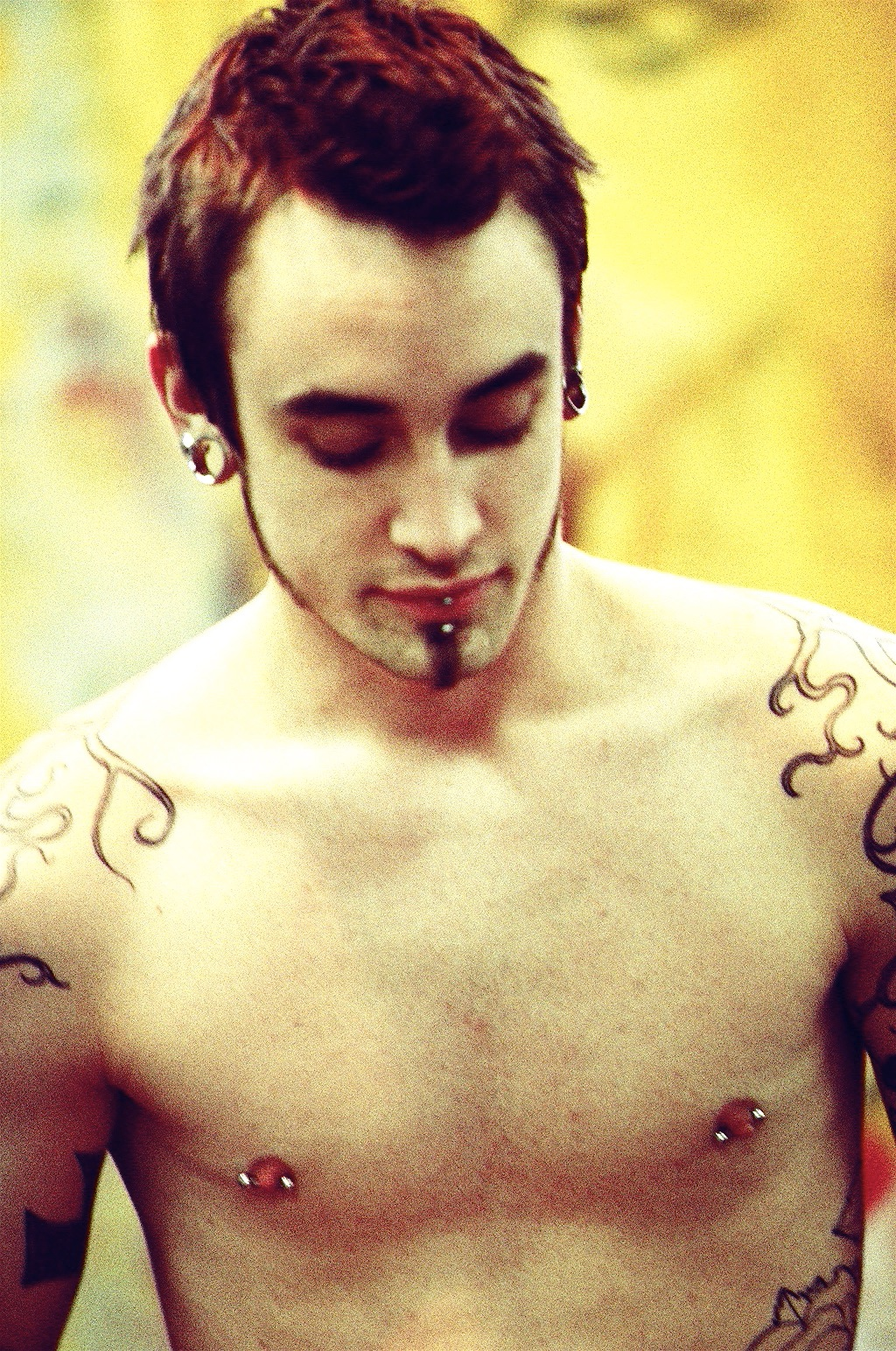
Male nipple piercings have become more popular in recent years.

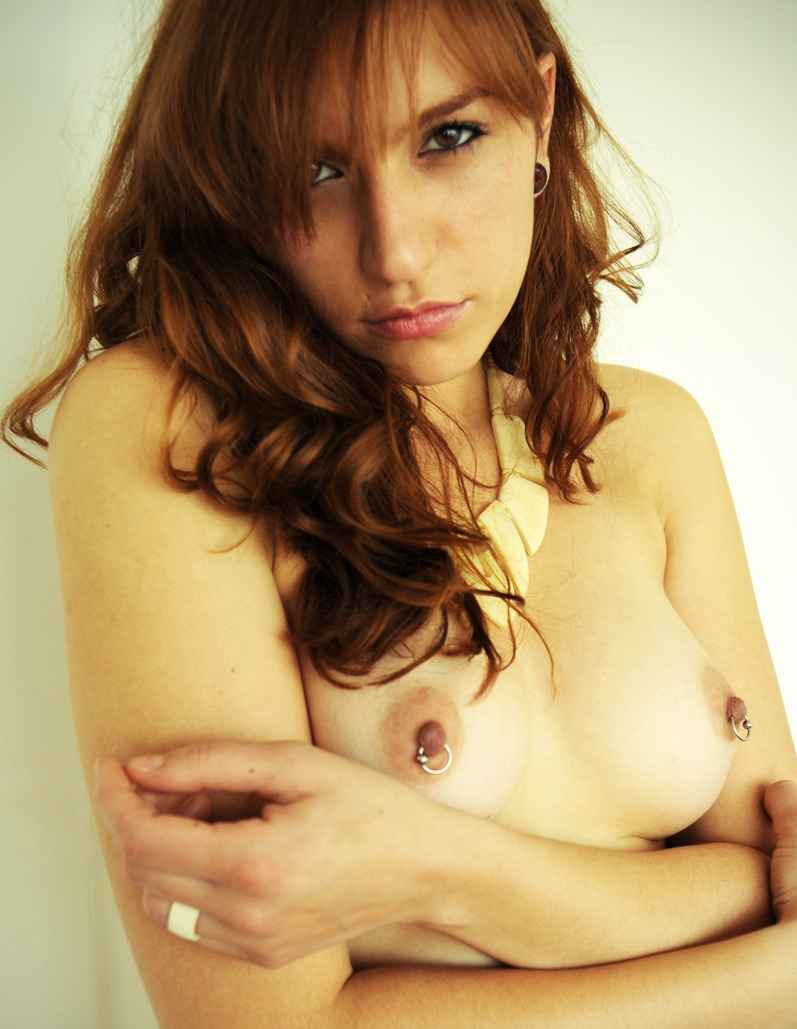
Pierced nipples do not interfere with breastfeeding, but medical advice is to remove nipple jewelry.

Nipple piercing has gained in popularity in the 21st century with a number of celebrities and fashion models having this type of piercing. In addition, many people are motivated to have nipple piercings for personal reasons including self-expression and a desire to feel unique. At least one study has shown that people spend, on average, 1–2 years making the decision to have a piercing.

== Sensitivity ==
Sexual arousal created by areola and nipple stimulation is reported to be enhanced by piercing the nipple. Many women say that they have experienced an increase in sensitivity and arousal after having their nipples pierced, but in a lot of cases it does not change. The increased protrusion of the nipples after piercing can draw ones attention to them, and this can make them feel more sensitive than they are. No scientific research has been published into the issue.

== Breastfeeding ==
A common question among women who consider nipple piercings is how it may affect breastfeeding. There is no evidence to suggest that proper nipple piercings can cause any complications with lactation. A letter in the Journal of the American Medical Association suggests improperly pierced nipples and scarring may result in blocked ducts.

The use of a piercing professional and good body piercing aftercare help to prevent infection. Frequent re-piercings of the nipple can damage it and cause complications. Most body piercing professionals will refuse to pierce a pregnant woman to ensure that the piercing is healed before breastfeeding, and because piercing causes stress on the body that could potentially complicate a pregnancy.

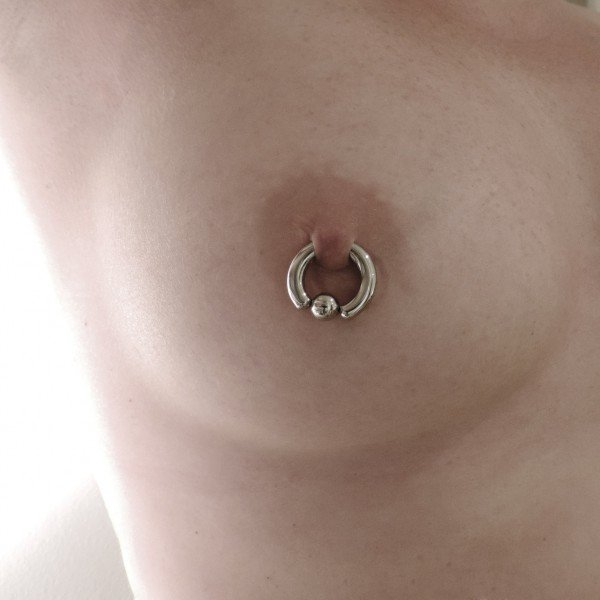
Stretched nipple piercing with larger gauge ball closure ring

Several complications have been noted involving breastfeeding with a piercing present, so it is recommended to remove nipple jewelry before nursing. Several complications resulting from nursing with nipple jewelry inserted can include poor latch, slurping, gagging, and milk leaking from the baby's mouth.

It can also be a potential choking hazard for the baby. As the baby sucks, the ends on a barbell (if worn) may come loose and could possibly lodge in the baby's throat (a captive bead ring, properly inserted, would lessen the risk of anything becoming loose, falling out, and lodging in the throat). The baby's gums and tongue as well as the soft and hard palate could be injured by the jewelry.

Some lactation consultants say that nipple piercings should not affect the ability to breastfeed but no clinical studies have been carried out on the subject. The suggested risks include pain while breastfeeding, reduced or diverted milk flow, and the infection of blocked lactiferous ducts.

== Inverted nipples ==
Inverted nipples are primarily a cosmetic problem but might interfere with breastfeeding. Nipple piercings have been proposed as a corrective strategy to protract the nipple, though this is only suitable in less severe cases. A piercing retained for three months can maintain eversion for 1 year.

== Potential complications ==
The nipple is fleshy enough to pierce securely behind plenty of skin to prevent rejection. However, if the jewelry gauge is too thin or the piercing is not deep enough to begin with, there is a risk of rejection. Metal allergies, infections, or excessive pulling/tugging can also cause the piercing to be rejected.

Death due to complications resulting from nipple piercings may have occurred, as have serious infections resulting in the removal of a breast after getting a nipple ring, but typically, a nipple piercing will take at least six months to a year for women or two to four months for men to heal fully.

There is an increased risk of nonpuerperal mastitis occurring in the months after nipple piercing.

== Notable wearers ==
A nipple piercing gained considerable media attention after Super Bowl XXXVIII, during which Justin Timberlake accidentally exposed Janet Jackson's right breast on which she had a nipple shield applied to a piercing. This incident is called Nipplegate. Nicole Richie set off an alarm at the Reno-Tahoe International Airport as she passed a metal detector with her nipple piercing. Pink had her nipple pierced backstage after a concert she was giving in Germany in the presence of her mother. The whole scene was filmed and later published on her DVD Pink: Live in Europe. Christina Aguilera had all her piercings removed except for her right nipple piercing. Pop singer Rihanna had her nipple piercing exposed first in the same way and later in a Lui magazine pictorial.

== See also ==
- Breast fetishism
- Genital piercing
- Navel piercing
- Stretching (body piercing)
- Toplessness
