= Piercer =

Piercer can mean:

- A technician who performs the act of body piercing
- Piercer (Dungeons & Dragons), a fictional creature in the Dungeons & Dragons fantasy roleplaying game with Luis Zenon
