= Plug (jewellery) =

Piece of jewelry

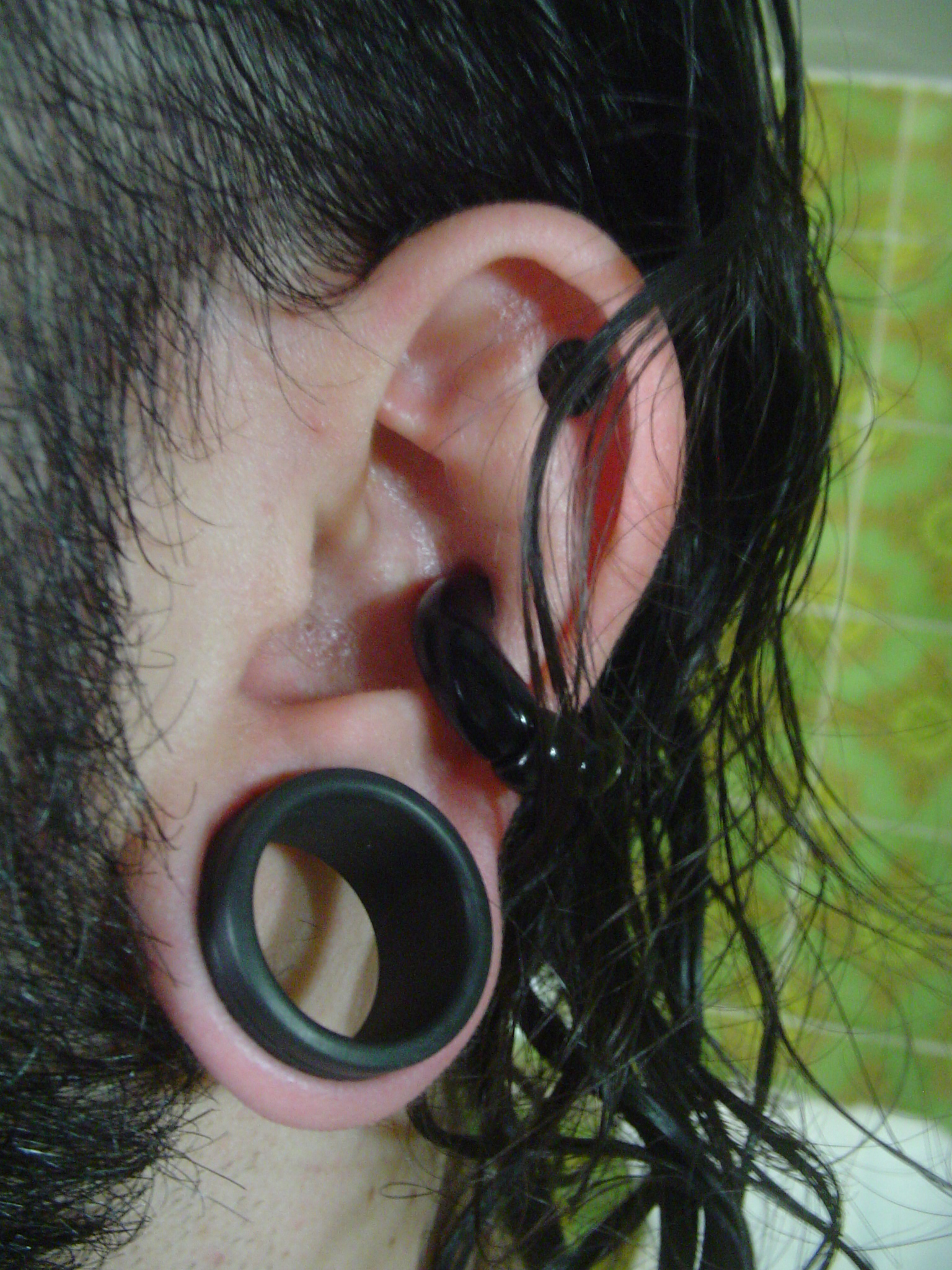
An example of an earplug

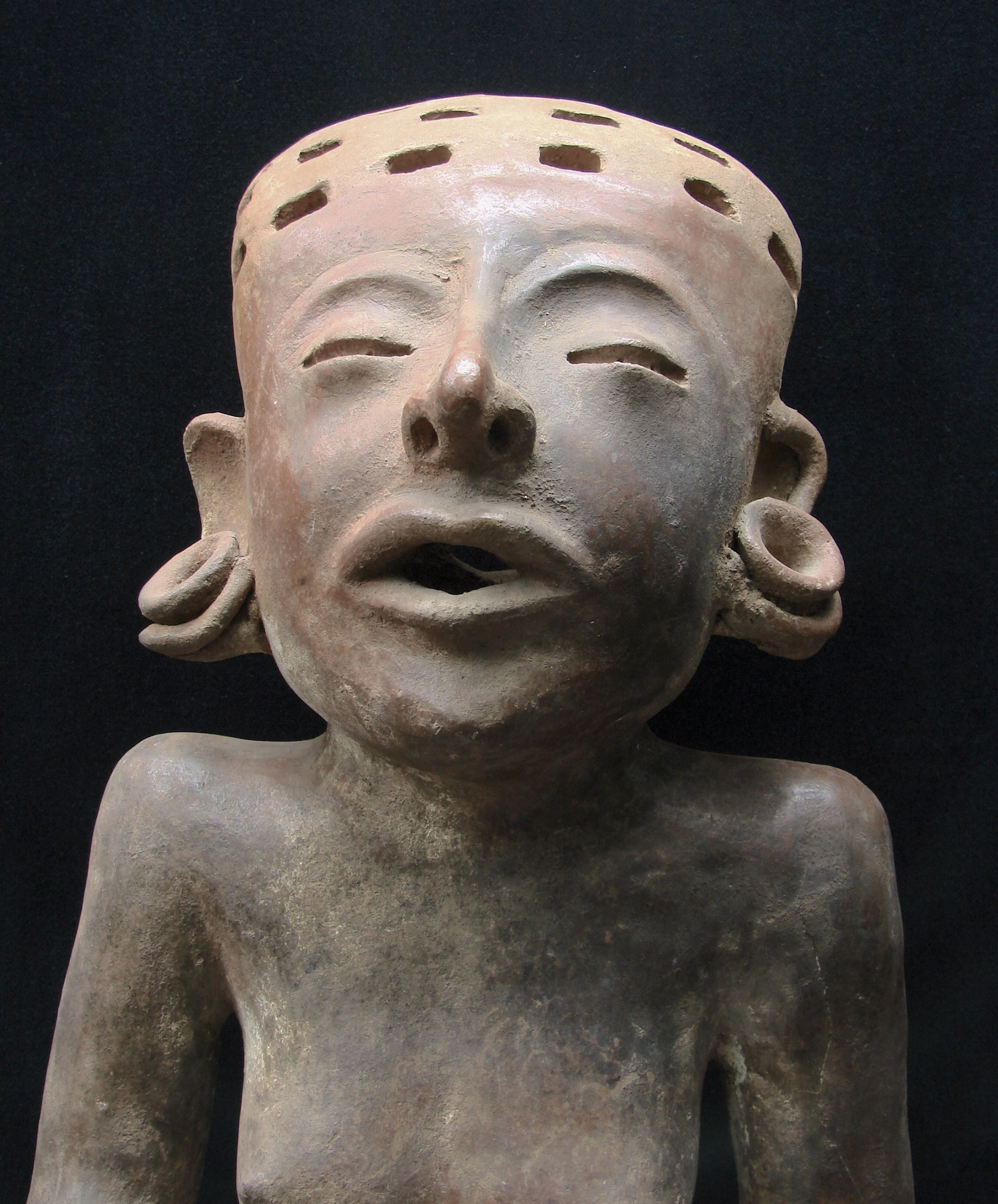
Totonac figurine wearing prominent earspools

A plug (sometimes earplug or earspool), in the context of body modification, is a short, cylindrical piece of jewelry commonly worn in larger-gauge body piercings. Modern western plugs are also called flesh tunnels. Because of their size—which is often substantially thicker than a standard metal earring—plugs can be made out of almost any material. Acrylic glass, metal, wood, bone, stone, horn, glass, silicone or porcelain are all potential plug materials.

Plugs are commonly, and have historically, been worn in the ears. They can, however, be inserted into any piercing.

In order for a plug to stay put within a piercing, the ends of its cylindrical shape are often flared out, or the plug is fastened in place by O-rings. Combinations of these two methods may also be used.

- A double-flared (or saddle) plug, flares outward at both ends, and is thinner towards the middle. No o-rings are needed to keep the plug in the piercing, but the fistula needs to be wide enough to accommodate the flare when the plug is initially put in.
- A single flared plug has one flared end, usually worn on the front of the piercing, and one end with no flare. The no flare end is held in place by an o-ring and may or may not be grooved. These plugs give the aesthetic of double-flared plugs without requiring that the wearer's fistulas be large enough to accommodate flares.
- A straight plug (or no-flare plug) is a typical-looking cylinder, without flares, and is kept in place by sliding o-rings against both ends of the plug. A grooved plug is a variation on the straight plug, with grooves carved in the material to hold the o-rings snug.

== Modern use ==
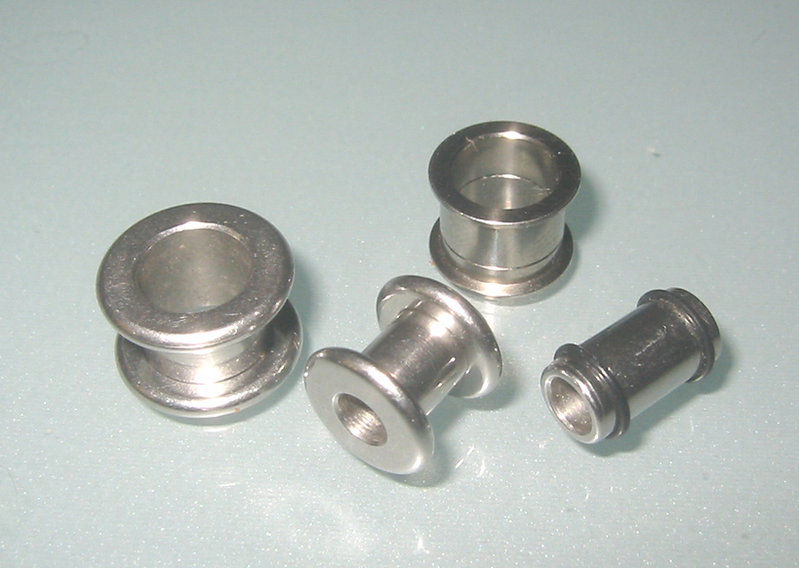
Surgical steel flesh tunnels in four different gauges

A flesh tunnel is a hollow, tube-shaped variety of body piercing jewelry. It is also sometimes referred to as a spool, fleshy, earlet, expander, or eyelet.

A flesh tunnel is usually used in stretched or scalpelled piercings. Flesh tunnels are made in smaller gauges. However, the smaller the gauge the smaller the effect to see through the plug becomes. A person may choose to wear flesh tunnels instead of flesh plugs because they weigh less; at higher gauges, the weight difference increases. Flesh tunnels may be worn with a captive bead ring or other object passed through them.

Flesh tunnels are fashioned from a broad range of materials, including surgical steel, titanium, Pyrex glass, silicone, acrylic glass, bone, horn, amber, bamboo, stone, and wood. Flesh tunnels, like flesh plugs, may feature a decorative inlay or semi-precious stones. Some flesh tunnels have flares to keep the jewellery from falling out. If there are no flares, grooves may be cut near the edges to allow rubber or silicone O-rings to hold the jewellery in place. The back of the flesh tunnel may also screw off. A flesh tunnel may also have an internally threaded backing, as externally threaded pieces can rip freshly stretched ears.

Although flesh tunnels are often worn in the earlobe, other soft-tissue piercings (such as in the nasal septum or nipples) can be fitted with one of an appropriate length.

== History ==
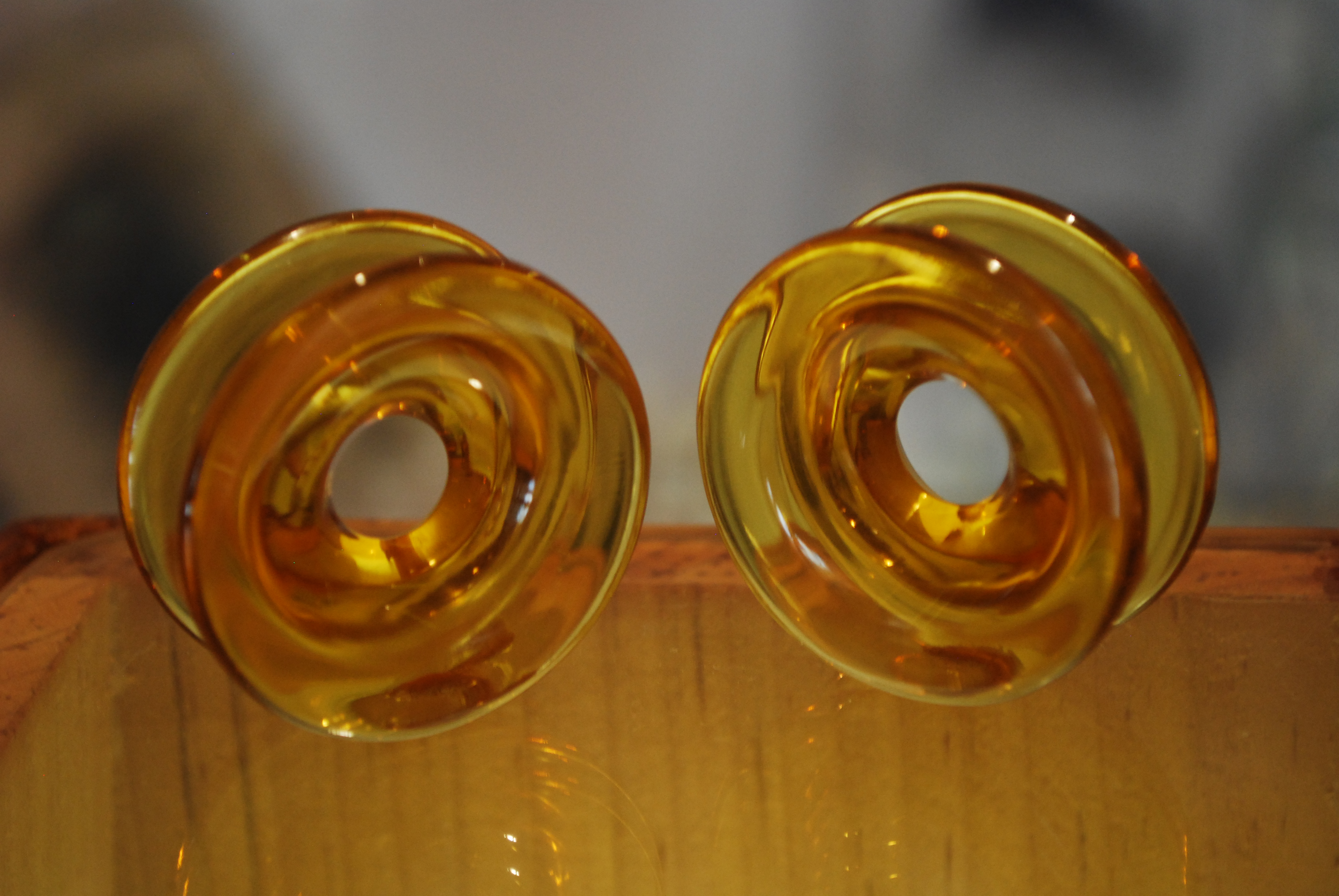
Pre-Hispanic earspools crafted from amber, at the Museum of Amber in San Cristobal de las Casas, Chiapas

During the ancient Egyptian New Kingdom, both sexes wore a variety of jewelry, including earplugs and large-gauge hoop-style earrings.

They were particularly used among indigenous cultures of the Americas, including Mesoamerican cultures such as the Maya and the Aztecs. They were most commonly made of gold, silver, or wood, but could also include shells or feathers. Their use could sometimes significantly stretch the earlobe. In Mesoamerica they were used from as early as the Preclassic Period (2000–100 BC).

Inca men wore gold or silver plugs in the ears, which indicated their nobility. Their stretched piercings, which could reach the size of two inches, later inspired a Spanish nickname for the Inca people: orejones ("big ears").

Ivory earplugs have been used by the Hmong people.

Silver plugs, called rombin, are worn by Aka women.

During the Bronze Age in what is today Spain, earlobe plugs were uncommon grave goods, indicating that they were reserved for high-status individuals.
