= Body piercing =

Form of body modification

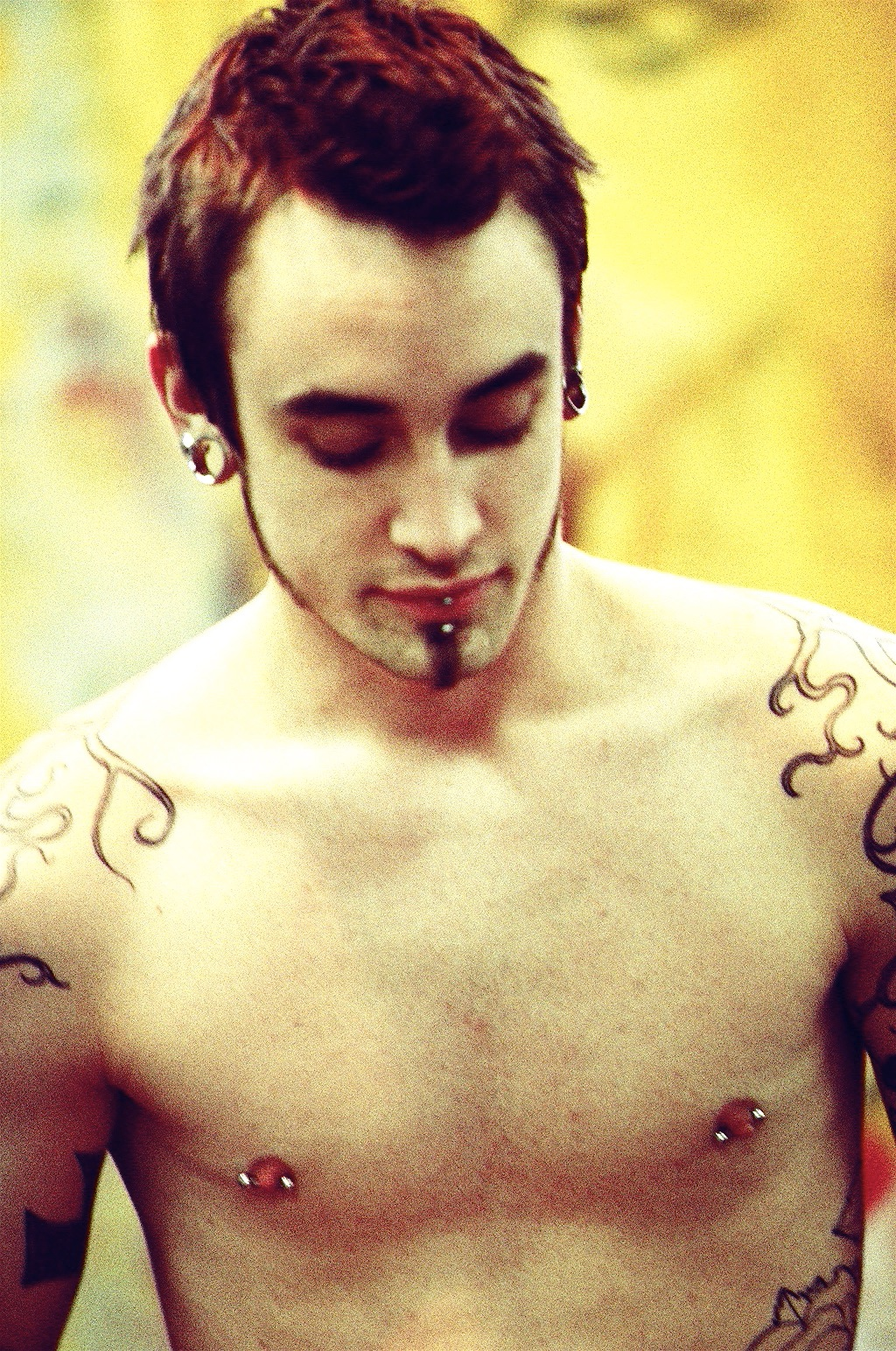
Nipple piercings, vertical labret piercing and stretched ears

Body piercing is a form of body modification involving the puncturing or cutting a part of the body to create an opening through which jewelry or implants can be worn or inserted. The word piercing can refer to the act or practice of body piercing, or to an opening in the body created by this act or practice. It can also, by metonymy, refer to the resulting decoration, or to the decorative jewelry used. Piercing implants alter the body and/or skin profile and appearance (e.g. golden threads installed subdermally, platinum, titanium or medical grade steel subdermal implants).

Ear piercing and nose piercing have been particularly widespread and are well represented in historical records and among grave goods. The oldest mummified remains ever discovered had earrings, attesting to the existence of the practice more than 5,000 years ago. Nose piercing is documented as far back as 1500 BCE. Piercings of these types have been documented globally, while lip and tongue piercings were historically found in some African cultures. Nipple and genital piercing have also been practiced by various cultures, with nipple piercing dating back at least to Ancient Rome while genital piercing is described in Ancient India c. 320 to 550 CE. The history of navel piercing is less clear. The practice of body piercing has waxed and waned in Western culture, but it has experienced an increase in popularity since World War II, with sites other than the ears gaining subcultural popularity in the 1970s and spreading to the mainstream in the 1990s.

The reasons for piercing or not piercing are varied. Some people pierce for religious or spiritual reasons, while others pierce for self-expression, for aesthetic value, for sexual pleasure, to conform to their culture or to rebel against it. Some forms of piercing remain controversial, particularly when applied to youth. The display or placement of piercings have been restricted by schools, employers and religious groups. In spite of the controversy, some people have practiced extreme forms of body piercing, with Guinness bestowing World Records on individuals with hundreds and even thousands of permanent and temporary piercings.

Contemporary body piercing practices emphasize the use of safe body piercing materials, frequently utilizing specialized tools developed for the purpose. Body piercing is an invasive procedure with some risks, including allergic reaction, infection, excessive scarring and unanticipated physical injuries, but such precautions as sanitary piercing procedures and careful aftercare are emphasized to minimize the likelihood of encountering serious problems. The healing time required for a body piercing may vary widely according to placement, from as little as a month for some genital piercings to as much as two full years for the navel. Some piercings may be more complicated, leading to rejection.

== History ==
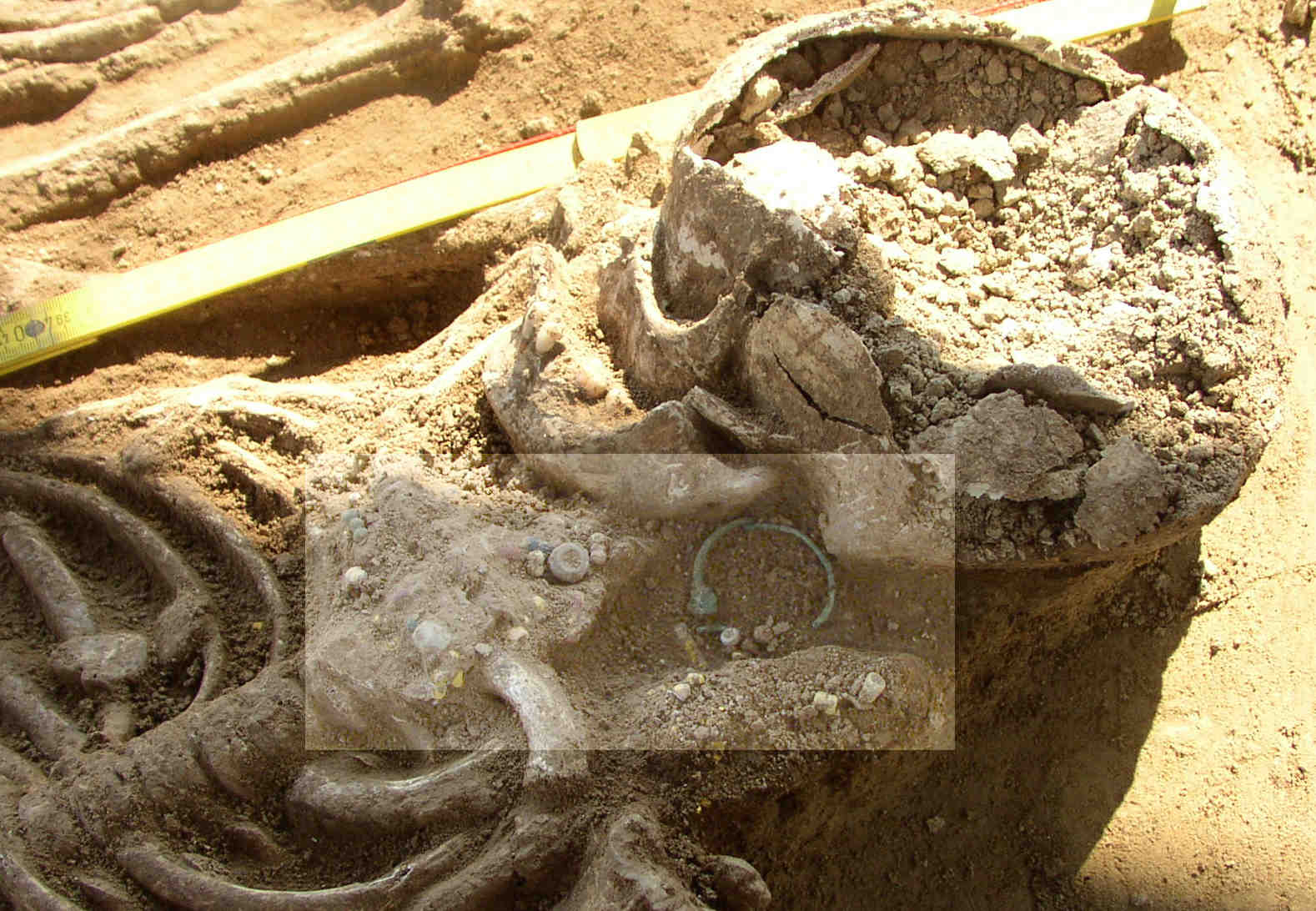
An earring found in an Alamannic grave in Germany, dated c. 6th or 7th century

Body adornment has only recently become a subject of serious scholarly research by archaeologists, who have been hampered in studying body piercing by a scarcity of primary sources. Early records rarely discussed the use of piercings or their meaning, and while jewelry is common among grave goods, the deterioration of the flesh that it once adorned makes it difficult to discern how the jewelry may have been used.

The modern record has been also distorted by the 20th-century inventions of piercing enthusiast Doug Malloy. In the 1960s and 1970s, Malloy marketed contemporary body piercing by giving it the patina of history. His pamphlet Body & Genital Piercing in Brief included such commonly reproduced urban legends as the notion that Prince Albert invented the piercing that shares his name in order to diminish the appearance of his large penis in tight trousers, and that Roman centurions attached their capes to nipple piercings. Some of Malloy's myths were reprinted as fact in subsequently published histories of piercing.

=== Ear piercing ===
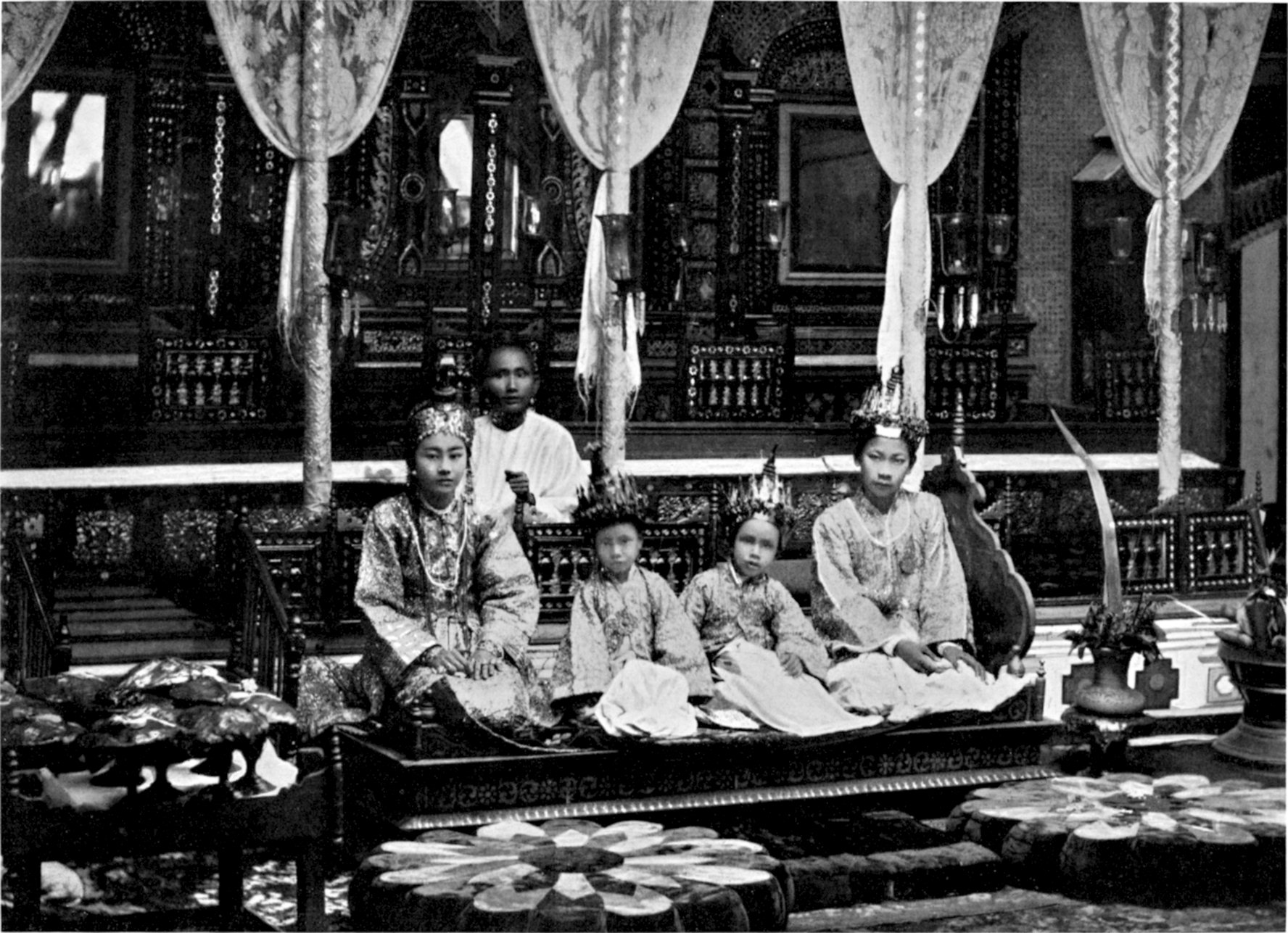
A traditional Burmese ear-boring ceremony

Ear piercing has been practiced all over the world since ancient times, and there is considerable written and archaeological evidence of the practice. Mummified bodies with pierced ears have been discovered, including the oldest mummified body discovered to date, the 5,300-year-old Ötzi the Iceman, which was found in a glacier in Italy. The mummy had an ear piercing 7–11 mm (0.28–0.43 in) in diameter. The oldest earrings were found in Sumer, in the Royal Cemetery of Ur, dating to c. 2550 BCE during the Early Dynastic Period III. Earrings are mentioned in the Bible. In Genesis 35:4, Jacob buries the earrings worn by members of his household along with their idols under a tree. In Exodus 32, Aaron makes the golden calf from melted earrings. Deuteronomy 15:12–17 dictates ear piercing for a slave who chooses not to be freed. Earrings are also referenced in connection to the Hindu goddess Lakshmi in the Vedas. Earrings for pierced ears were found in a grave in the Ukok region between Russia and China dated between 400 and 300 BCE.

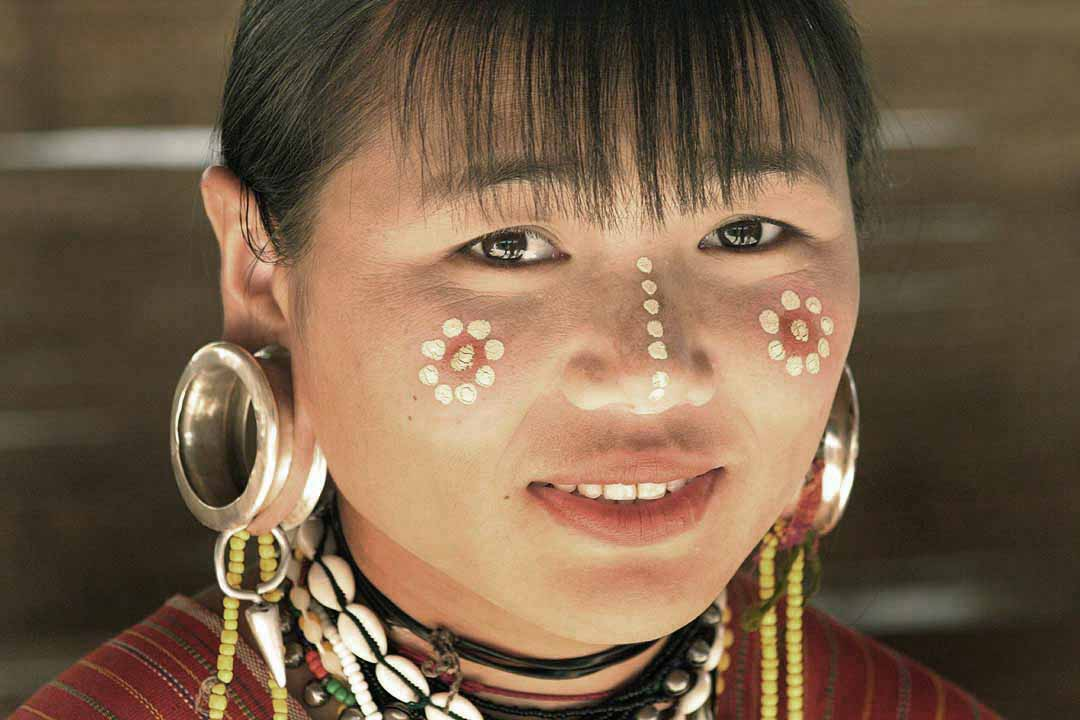
A Karen woman from Burma with traditional ear plugs

Among the Tlingit people of the Pacific Northwest of America, earrings were a sign of nobility and wealth, as the placement of each earring on a child had to be purchased at an expensive potlatch. Earrings were common in the Eighteenth dynasty of Egypt (1550–1292 BCE), generally taking the form of a dangling, gold hoop. Gem-studded, golden earrings shaped like asps seem to have been reserved for nobility. The ancient Greeks wore paste pendant earrings shaped like sacred birds or demigods, while the women of ancient Rome wore precious gemstones in their ears.

In Europe, earrings for women fell from fashion generally between the 4th and 16th centuries, as styles in clothing and hair tended to obscure the ears, but they gradually thereafter came back into vogue in Italy, Spain, England and France—spreading as well to North America—until after World War I when piercing fell from favor and the newly invented Clip-on earring became fashionable. According to The Anatomie of Abuses by Philip Stubbs, earrings were even more common among men of the 16th century than women, while Raphael Holinshed in 1577 confirms the practice among "lusty courtiers" and "gentlemen of courage." Evidently originating in Spain, the practice of ear piercing among European men spread to the court of Henry III of France and then to Elizabethan era England, where earrings (typically worn in one ear only) were sported by such notables as Robert Carr, 1st Earl of Somerset, Shakespeare, Sir Walter Raleigh and Charles I of England. Common men wore earrings as well. From the European Middle Ages, a superstitious belief that piercing one ear improved long-distance vision led to the practice among sailors and explorers. Sailors also pierced their ears in the belief that their earrings could pay for a Christian burial if their bodies washed up on shore.

=== Nose piercing ===
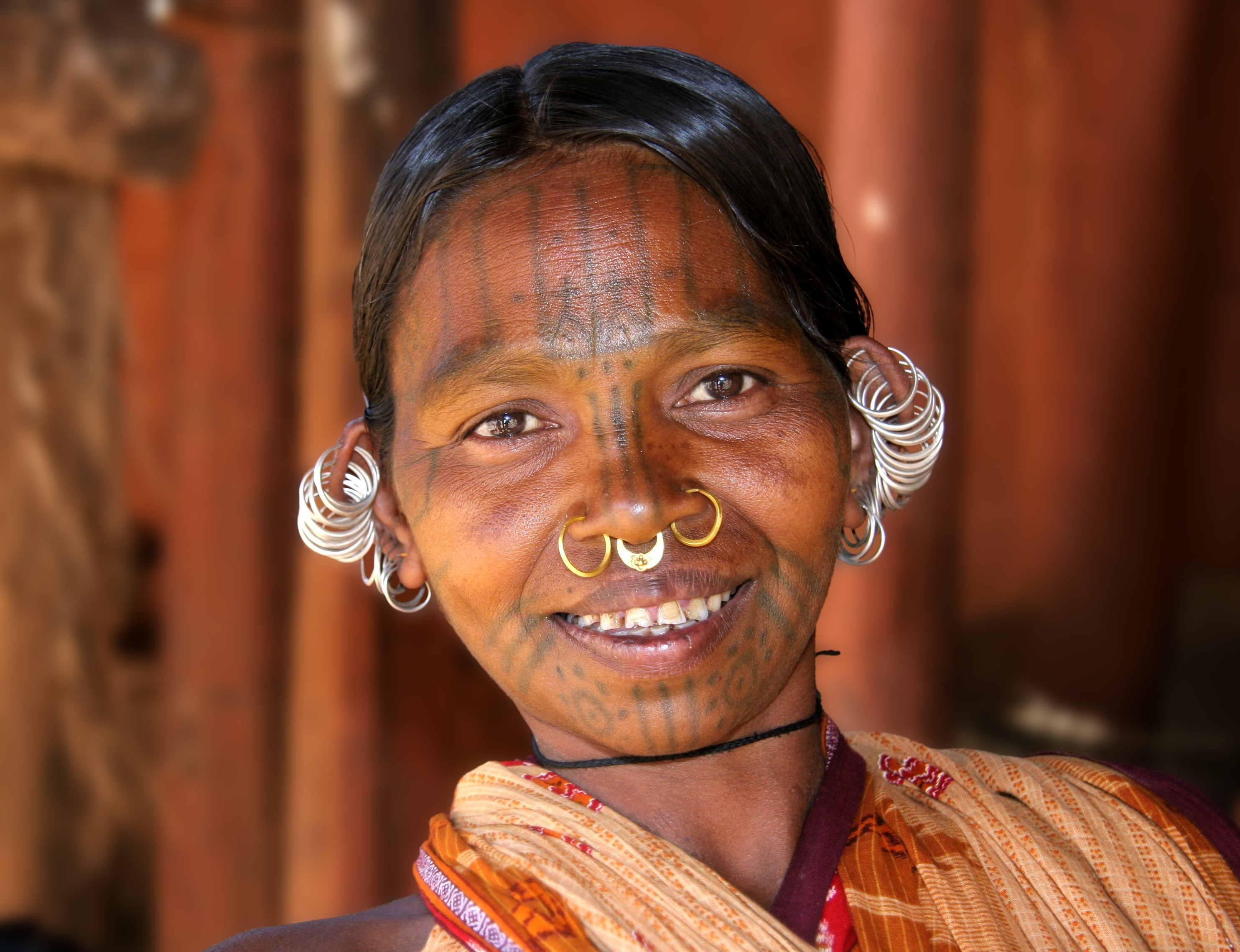
Khond woman with ear, septum and nostril piercings

Nose piercing also has a long history. c. 1500 BCE, the Vedas refer to Lakshmi's nose piercings, but modern practice in India is believed to have spread from the Middle Eastern nomadic tribes by route of the Mughal emperors in the 16th century. It remains customary for Indian Hindu women of childbearing age to wear a nose stud, usually in the left nostril, due to the nostril's association with the female reproductive organs in Ayurvedic medicine. This piercing is sometimes done the night before the woman marries.

In Genesis 24:22, Abraham's servant gives Rebecca a nose ring. Nose piercing has been practiced by the Bedouin tribes of the Middle East and the Berber and Beja peoples of Africa, as well as Australian Aboriginals. Many Native American and Alaskan tribes practiced septum piercing. It was popular among the Aztecs, the Mayans and the tribes of New Guinea, who adorned their pierced noses with bones and feathers to symbolize wealth and (among men) virility. The name of the Nez Perce tribe was derived from the practice, though nose piercing was not common within the tribe. The Aztecs, Mayans and Incas wore gold septum rings for adornment, with the practice continued to this day by the Guna of Panama. Nose piercing also remains popular in Pakistan and Bangladesh and is practiced in a number of Middle Eastern and Arab countries.

=== Piercings of the lip and tongue ===
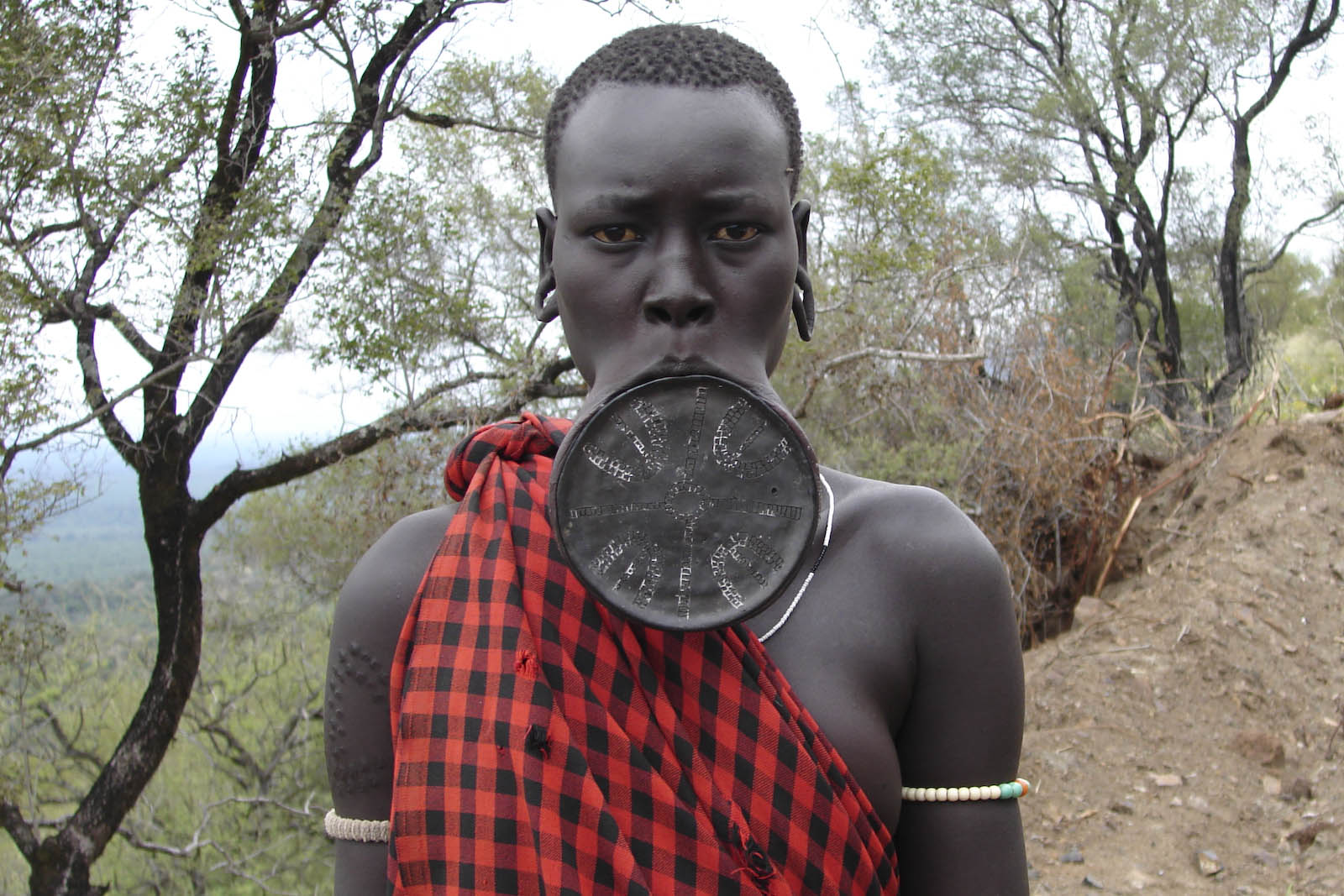
A Nilotic Mursi woman

Lip piercing and lip stretching were historically found in certain tribal cultures in Africa and the Americas. Pierced adornments of the lip, or labrets, were sported by the Tlingit as well as peoples of Papua New Guinea and the Amazon basin. Aztecs and Mayans also wore labrets, while the Dogon people of Mali and the Nuba of the Nile Valley wore rings. The practice of stretching the lips by piercing them and inserting plates or plugs was found throughout Pre-Columbian Mesoamerica and South America as well as among some of the tribes of the Pacific Northwest and Africa. In some parts of Malawi, it was quite common for women to adorn their lips with a lip disc called a "pelele" that by means of gradual enlargement from childhood could reach several inches of diameter and would eventually alter the occlusion of the jaw. Such lip stretching is still practiced in some places. Women of the Nilotic Mursi tribe in the Nile Valley wear lip rings on occasion that may reach 15 centimetres (5.9 in) in diameter.

In some Pre-Columbian and North American cultures, labrets were seen as a status symbol. They were the oldest form of high status symbol among the Haida women, though the practice of wearing them died out due to Western influence.

Tongue piercing was practiced by the Aztec, Olmec and Mayan cultures as a ritual symbol. Wall paintings highlight a ritual of the Mayans during which nobility would pierce their tongues with thorns. The blood would be collected on bark, which would be burned in honor of the Mayan gods. It was also practiced by the Haida, Kwakiutl and Tlingit, as well as the Fakirs and Sufis of the Middle East.

=== Nipple, navel and genital piercing ===
A woman with nipple piercings.

The history of nipple piercing, navel piercing, and genital piercing has been particularly misrepresented by printed works continuing to repeat myths that were originally promulgated by Malloy in the pamphlet Body & Genital Piercing in Brief. For example, according to Malloy's colleague Jim Ward, Malloy claimed navel piercing was popular among ancient Egyptian aristocrats and was depicted in Egyptian statuary, a claim that is widely repeated. Other sources say there are no records to support a historical practice for navel piercing.

However, records do exist that refer to practices of nipple and genital piercing in various cultures prior to the 20th century. Kama Sutra, dated to the Gupta Empire of Ancient India, describes genital piercing to permit sexual enhancement by inserting pins and other objects into the foreskin of the penis. The Dayak tribesmen of Borneo passed a shard of bone through their glans for the opposite reason, to diminish their sexual activity. In the Talmud (Tractate Shabbat 64a), there may be mention of a genital piercing in the prohibition against the kumaz, which medieval French Talmudic commenter Rashi interpreted as a chastity piercing for women. Other interpreters have, however, suggested that the kumaz was rather a pendant shaped like a vulva or a girdle.

Nipple piercing may have been a sign of masculinity for the soldiers of Rome. Nipple piercing has also been connected to rites of passage for both British and American sailors who had traveled beyond a significant latitude and longitude. It is widely reported that in the 1890s, nipple rings called "bosom rings" resurfaced as a fashion statement among women of the West, who would wear them on one or both sides, but if such a trend existed, it was short-lived.

=== Growing popularity in the West ===
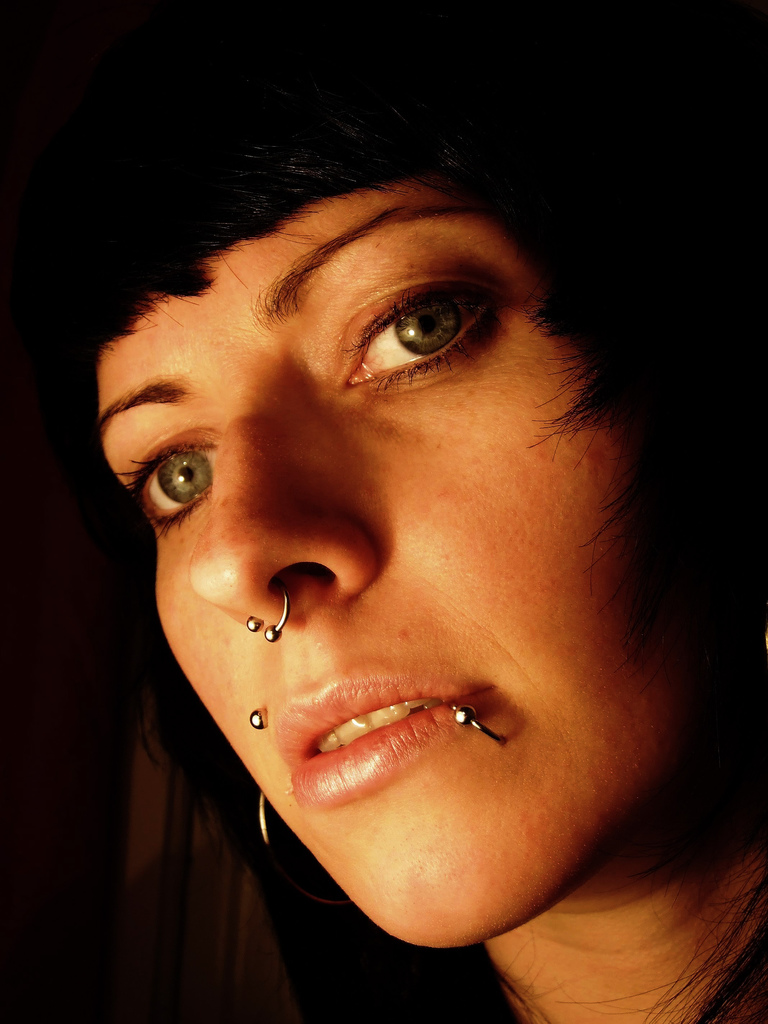
Person with several facial piercings (Monroe, Septum and Lip)

By the early part of the 20th century, piercing of any body part other than the ear lobe had become uncommon in the West. After World War II, it began increasing in popularity among the gay male subculture. Clip-on earrings were primarily the preferred fashion in the 1920s; however, the physical piercing of lobes began growing in popularity from the 1960s. In the 1970s, piercing began to expand, as the punk movement embraced it, featuring nontraditional adornment such as safety pins; and Fakir Musafar began popularizing it as a form of Modern Primitivism, which incorporated piercing elements from other cultures, such as stretching.

Body piercing was also heavily popularized in the United States by a group of Californians, including Doug Malloy and Jim Ward. Ward (inspired by and with money from Malloy) opened The Gauntlet as a home business in November 1975 and then as a commercial storefront operation in West Hollywood on 17 November 1978. The establishment of this business – considered the first of its type in the United States – was the beginning of the body piercing industry. As word of body piercing spread to the wider community, Ward began to publish the first publication dedicated to the subject, PFIQ.

A table in Larry Townsend's The Leatherman's Handbook II (the 1983 second edition; the 1972 first edition did not include this list) which is generally considered authoritative states that a purple handkerchief is a symbol for body piercing in the handkerchief code, which is employed usually among gay male casual-sex seekers or BDSM practitioners in the United States, Canada, Australia and Europe. Wearing the handkerchief on the left indicates the top, dominant, or active partner; right the bottom, submissive, or passive partner. However, negotiation with a prospective partner remains important because, as Townsend noted, people may wear hankies of any color "only because the idea of the hankie turns them on" or "may not even know what it means".

A significant development in body piercing in England occurred in 1987, when during Operation Spanner, a group of homosexuals—including well known body piercer Alan Oversby—were convicted of assault for their involvement in consensual sadomasochism over a 10-year period, including acts of body piercing. The courts declared that decorative body piercing was not illegal, but that erotic body piercing was. Subsequently, the group Countdown on Spanner formed in 1992 in protest. The group appealed the decision before the High Court of Justice, the House of Lords and finally the European Commission of Human Rights, attempting to overturn the verdict which ruled consent immaterial in acts of sadomasochism, without success. In spite of their repeated failures, the situation publicized the issue, with The Times editorializing the court's decision as "illiberal nonsense" in 1993. In 1996 Countdown on Spanner received the Large Nonprofit Organization of the Year award as part of the Pantheon of Leather Awards.

A screen shot from "Cryin'", featuring Alicia Silverstone and body piercer Paul King

Body modification in general became more popular in the United States in the 1990s, as piercing also became more widespread, with growing availability and access to piercings of the navel, nose, eyebrows, lips, tongue, nipples, and genitals. In 1993, a navel piercing was depicted in MTV Video Music Awards' "Music Video of the Year", "Cryin'", which inspired a plethora of young female fans to follow suit. According to 2009's The Piercing Bible, it was this consumer drive that "essentially inspired the creation of body-piercing as a full-fledged industry." Body piercing was given another media-related boost in 2004, when during a halftime performance at Super Bowl XXXVIII, singer Janet Jackson experienced a "wardrobe malfunction" that left exposed Jackson's pierced nipple. Some professional body piercers reported considerable increases in business following the heavily publicized event.

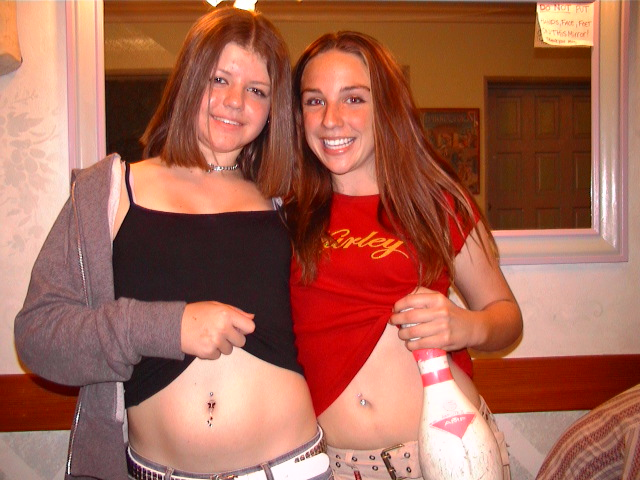
Two young women with navel piercings, 2004

Alongside traditional piercing techniques, modern body adornment includes variant techniques such as pocketing and flesh stapling, although as of 2007 these were still not widely made available by piercers. In the first of these, a scalpel opens the skin or mucous membranes, into which the larger end of a piece of jewelry or—if using a bar—two ends are inserted. These kinds of piercings may be difficult to remove, as fibrous tissue can form around the end or ends of the jewelry or the implanted tube into which the jewelry is placed. When a bar is used, pocketing looks quite similar to flesh stapling. The latter technique is frequently done in the form of a ladder. Modern body piercing practices also include dermal anchoring or dermal piercing, which combines piercing and implantation to create a single point of opening in the body (whereas pocketing creates two) to permit one end of the jewelry to show above the surface of the skin. While this technique can be performed almost anywhere on the body, as of 2007 it was popularly done between the eyes, on the chest, or on the finger, to simulate a ring.

=== 21st century ===
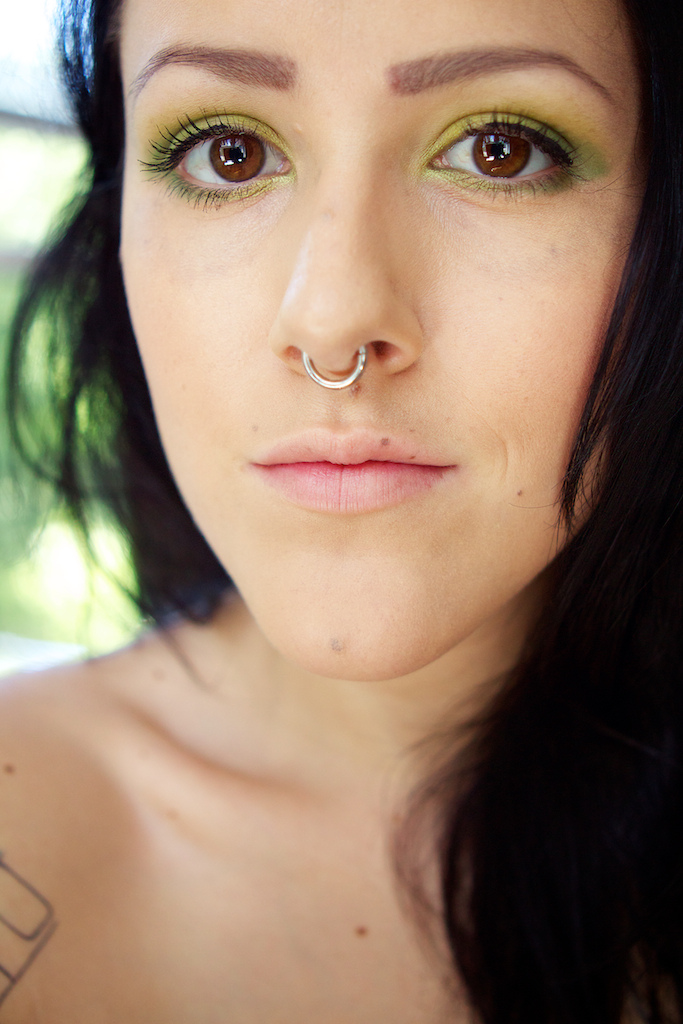
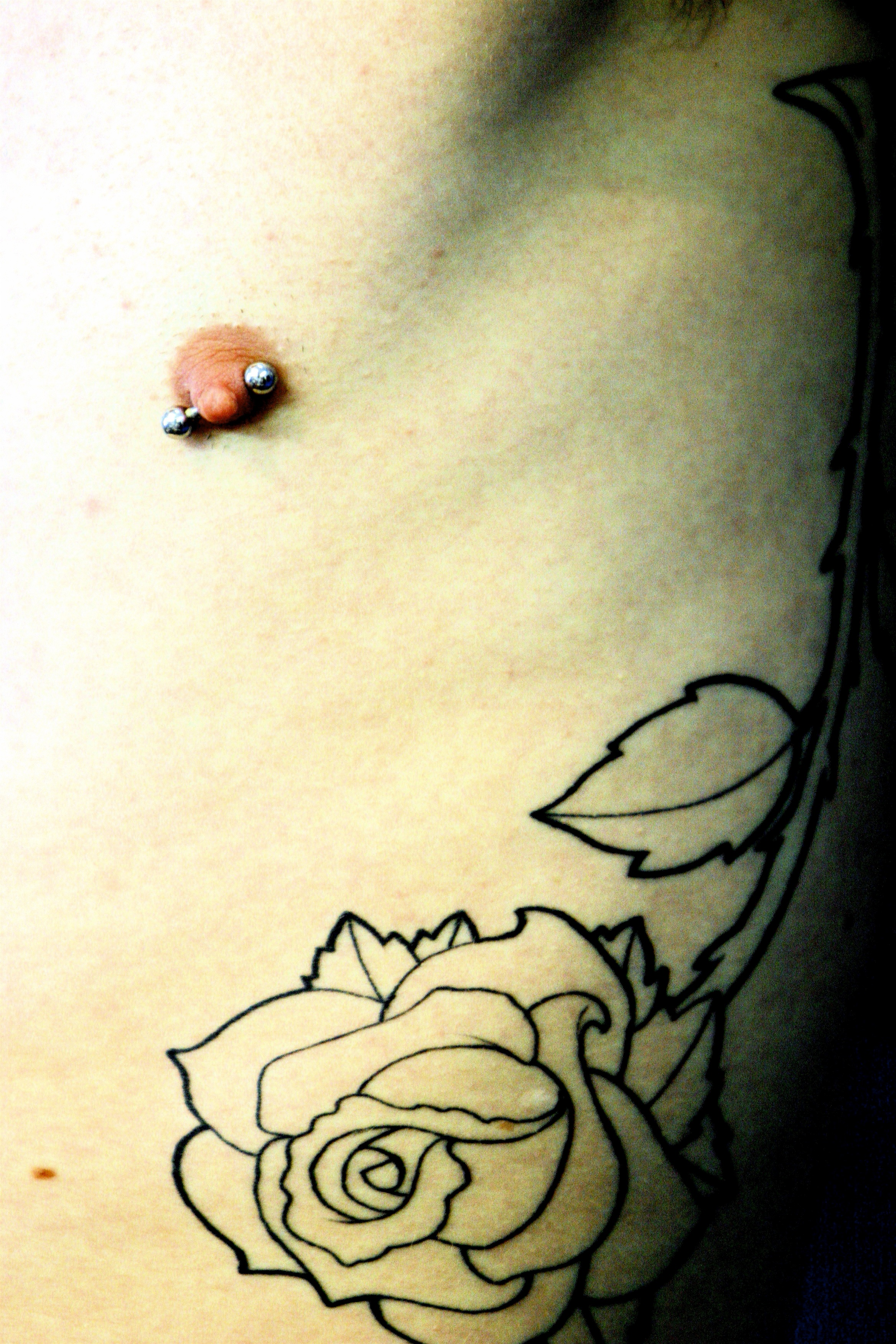
Septum piercing and Nipple piercing are both piercings that gained increased popularity in the second decade of the 21st century.

The practice of body piercing is subject to trends and fashions. Belly button and eyebrow piercings were popular during the 1990s when the piercing trend entered the mainstream. In 2015, the septum piercing and nipple piercing were considered highly fashionable. Additionally, the practice of ear lobe gauging or stretching has become popular with the turn of the century.

A 2005 survey of 10,503 people in England over the age of 16 found that approximately 10% (1,049) had body piercings in sites other than the earlobe, with a heavy representation of women aged 16–24 (46.2% piercing in that demographic). Among the most common body sites, the navel was top at 33%, with the nose and ear (other than lobe) following at 19% and 13%. The tongue and nipple tied at 9%. The eyebrow, lip and genitals were 8%, 4% and 2%, respectively. Preference among women followed closely on that ranking, though eyebrow piercings were more common than nipple piercings. Among male responders, the order was significantly different, descending in popularity from nipple, eyebrow, ear, tongue, nose, lip and genitals.

A cross-cultural study published in 2011 found that individuals with piercings were likely to be involved in other forms of countercultural expression as well.

== Reasons for piercing ==
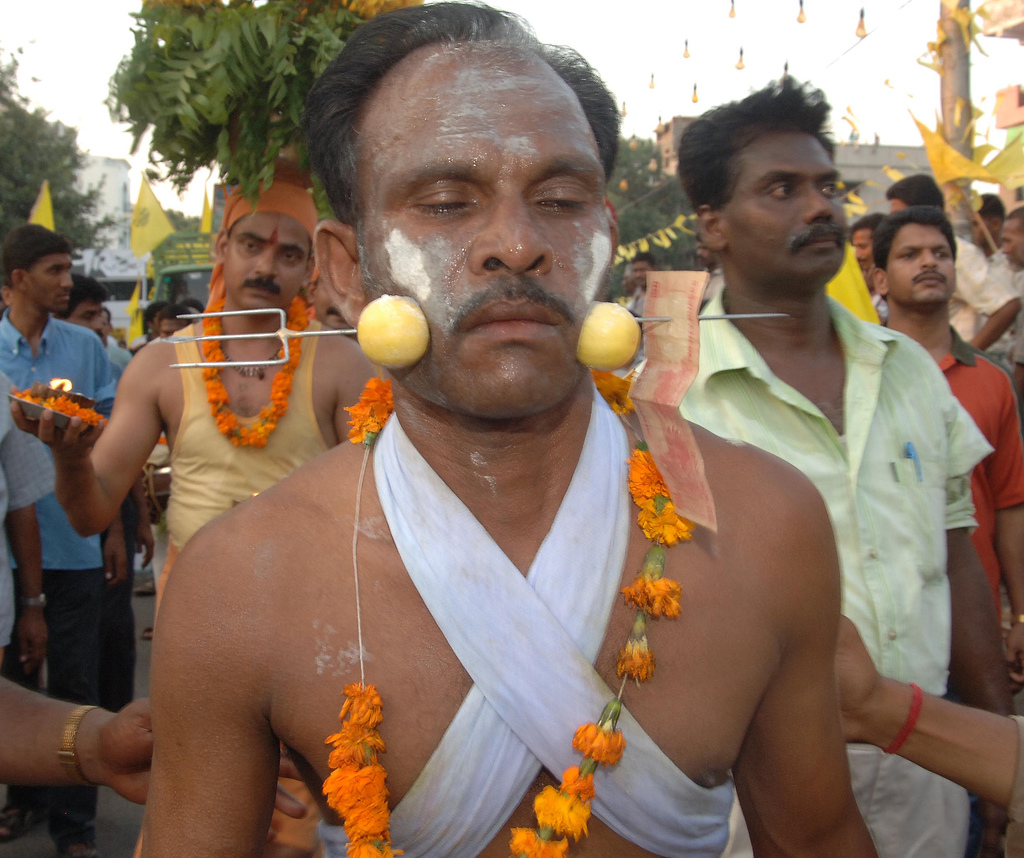
A Tamil man in a religious procession with a trident piercing his cheeks

Reasons for piercing vary greatly. A 2001 survey in Clinical Nursing Research, an international publication, found that 62% of people who have had piercings have done so in an effort "to express their individuality." People also pierce to commemorate landmark events or to overcome traumatic ones. According to the assistant director of the Frankfurt University Teaching Hospital for Psychosomatic Medicine and Psychotherapy, some sexual abuse survivors choose body piercing as a means of "reclaiming body parts from memories of abuse". Piercing can also be chosen for simple aesthetic value, to highlight particular areas of the body, as a navel piercing may reflect a woman's satisfaction with the shape and condition of her stomach. Some people pierce, permanently or temporarily, to enhance sexual pleasure. Genital and nipple piercings may increase sexual satisfaction. Some people participate in a form of body play known as play piercing, in which piercings may be done temporarily on the genitals or elsewhere on the body for sexual gratification.

Piercing combined with suspension was historically important in the religious ceremonies of some Native Americans, featuring in many variants of the Sun Dance ceremony, including that practiced by the Crow Nation. During the Crow ceremony, men who wished to obtain visions were pierced in the shoulders or chest by men who had undergone the ceremony in the past and then suspended by these piercings from poles in or outside of the Sun Dance Lodge. Some contemporary Southeast Asian rituals also practice body piercing, as a form of spiritual self-mortification. Generally, the subject attempts to enter an analgesic trance prior to the piercing.

Cheek piercing at a ritual in Qionghai, Hainan, China

Bridging the gap between self-expressive piercing and spiritual piercing, modern indigenous people may use piercing and other forms of body modification as a way of ritually reconnecting with themselves and society, which according to Musafar once used piercing as a culturally binding ritual. But at the same time that piercing can be culturally binding, it may also be a means of rebellion, particularly for adolescents in Western cultures.

A fifteen-year analysis published in 2011, Body Piercing and Identity Construction, found that public piercing served as a mechanism of both accelerated camaraderie and political communication, while private piercings served to enhance sexuality and contest heteronormativity.

== Piercing prohibitions and taboos ==
While body piercing has grown more widespread, it remains controversial. Some countries impose age of consent laws requiring parental permission for minors to receive body piercings. Scotland requires parental consent for persons under 16, while in 2011 Wales began considering a similar law. In addition to imposing parental consent requirements, Western Australia prohibits piercing body parts of minors, including genitals and nipples, on penalty of fine and imprisonment for the piercer. Many states in the U.S. also require parental consent to pierce minors, with some also requiring the physical presence of the parents during the act. The state of Idaho has imposed a minimum age for body piercing at 14.

In 2004, controversy erupted in Crothersville, Indiana, when a local high school featured a spread on "Body Decorations" in its yearbook that featured tattoos and body piercings of teachers and students. That same year, in Henry County, Georgia, a 15-year-old boy remained in in-school suspension for a full month for violating school policy by wearing eyebrow, nose, labret and tongue piercings to school. His mother subsequently decided to homeschool him. As of 2022, the school district has maintained its policy against body piercing.

According to 2006's Tattoos and Body Piercing, corporate dress codes can also strictly limit piercing displays. At that time, Starbucks limited piercings to two per ear and jewelry to small, matched earrings. Employees of Walt Disney Parks and Resorts were not permitted to display piercings at all. However, also in 2006, amid a series of employment discrimination cases in the United States, it became clear that the legality of these dress codes depended upon broader social acceptance of body piercing. As early as 2011, some management literature acknowledged that workplace prohibitions on body modification could negatively impact human resources development; one author compared the practice to older prohibitions on long hair. As of 2020, employment discrimination based on personal appearance including body piercings may be illegal in France.

Body piercing in some religions is held to be destructive to the body. Some passages of the Bible, including Leviticus 19:28, have been interpreted as prohibiting body modification because the body is held to be the property of God. The Church of Jesus Christ of Latter-day Saints has taken an official position against most piercings unless for medical reasons, although they accept piercings for women as long as there is only one set of piercings in the lower lobe of the ears and no other place on the body. Wearing of very large nose rings on Shabbat is forbidden by the Talmud.

In 2018 the first piercing business in the UAE was opened in Dubai by American piercer, Maria Tash.

== World records ==
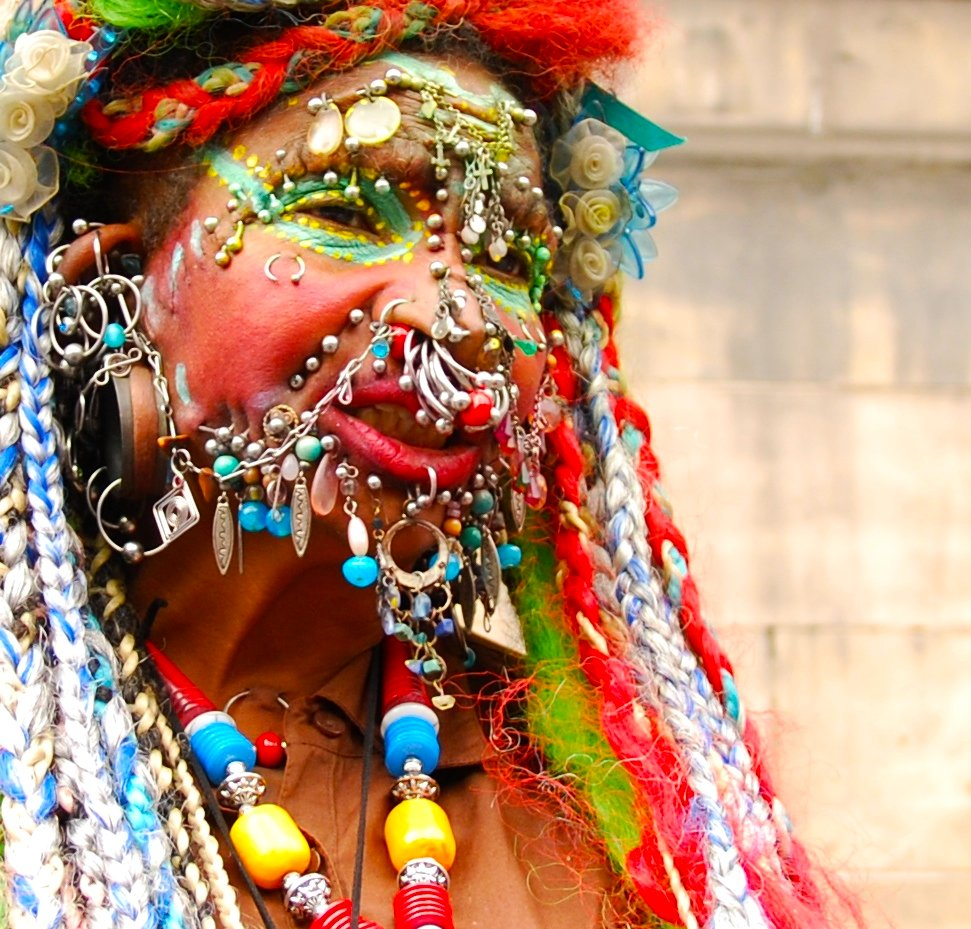
Elaine Davidson, the "Most Pierced Woman" in the world as of 2009

Officially titled "Most Pierced Woman", Elaine Davidson of Brazil holds the Guinness World Record for most permanent piercings, first setting this record in 2000 upon verification by Guinness judges of 462 body piercings, with 192 at the time being around her head and face. As of 8 June 2006, her Guinness-certified piercings numbered 4,225. In February 2009, The Daily Telegraph reported that she had 6,005. The "Most Pierced Man" as of 2009 was Luis Antonio Agüero, who had 230 permanent piercings, with 175 rings adorning his face alone.

In January 2003, Canadian Brent Moffat set the World Record for most body piercings in one session (700 piercings with 18g surgical needles in 1 session of 7 hours, using play piercing where the skin is pierced and sometimes jewelry is inserted, which is worn temporarily). In December of the same year, Moffat had 900 piercings in 4½ hours. On 4 March 2006, the record was overturned by Kam Ma, who had 1,015 temporary metal rings inserted in 7 hours and 55 minutes. The record for most body piercings with surgical needles was set on 29 May 2008, when Robert Jesus Rubio allowed 900 18-gauge, 0.5 centimetres (0.20 in)-long surgical needles to be inserted into his body.

== Contemporary piercing practices ==
=== Contemporary body piercing jewelry ===
Body piercing jewelry should be hypoallergenic. A number of materials are used, with varying strengths and weaknesses. Surgical stainless steel, niobium and titanium are commonly used metals, with titanium the least likely to cause allergic reaction of the three. Platinum and palladium are also safe alternatives, even in fresh piercings. Gold (yellow, rose, or white) is appropriate for initial piercings if it is 14k or higher, nickel- and cadmium-free, and alloyed for biocompatibility. Gold higher than 18k is too soft for body jewelry because it can easily be scratched or nicked. An additional risk for allergic reaction may arise when the stud or clasp of jewelry is made from a different metal than the primary piece.

Body piercing jewelry is measured by thickness and diameter/length. Most countries use millimeters. In the US, the Brown & Sharpe AWG gauging system is used, which assigns lower numbers to thicker middles. 00 gauge is 9.246 millimetres (0.3640 in), while 20 gauge is 0.813 millimetres (0.0320 in).

=== Piercing tools ===
Permanent body piercings are performed by creating an opening in the body using a sharp object through the area to be pierced. This can either be done by puncturing an opening using a needle (usually a hollow medical needle) or scalpel or by removing tissue, either with a dermal punch or through scalpelling.

Tools used in body piercing include:

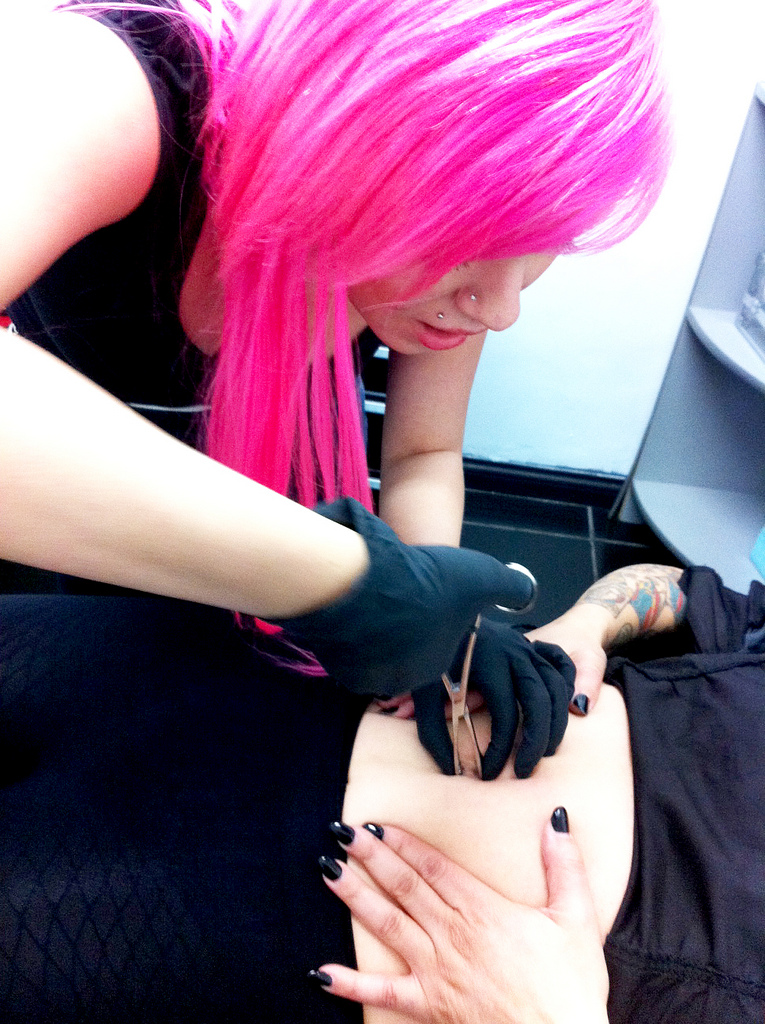
Piercer using a clamp in the early stages of the navel piercing process

The piercing needle
The standard method in the United States involves making an opening using a beveled-tip hollow medical needle, which is available in different lengths, gauges and even shapes. While straight needles are useful for many body parts, curved needles are manufactured for areas where straight needles are not ideal. The needle selected is typically the same gauge (or sometimes larger as with cartilage piercings) as the initial jewelry to be worn, with higher gauges indicating thinner needles. The needle is inserted into the body part being pierced, frequently by hand but sometimes with the aid of a needle holder or pusher. While the needle is still in the body, the initial jewelry to be worn in the piercing is pushed through the opening, following the back of the needle. Jewelry is often inserted into the hollow end of a needle, so that as the needle pulls through the jewelry is left behind.
The indwelling cannula
Many piercers use a needle containing a cannula (or catheter), a hollow plastic tube placed at the end of the needle. In some countries, the piercing needle favoured in the United States is regarded as a medical device and is illegal for body piercers. The procedure is similar to the piercing needle method, but the initial jewelry is inserted into the back of the cannula and the cannula and the jewelry are then pulled through the piercing. More bleeding may follow, as the piercing is larger than the jewelry.
The dermal punch
A dermal punch is used to remove a circular area of tissue, into which jewelry is placed, and may be useful for larger cartilage piercings. They are popular for use in ears, though not legal for use by nonmedical personnel in some jurisdictions.
The piercing gun
The vast majority of women in the West with pierced ears have the piercing done with a piercing gun. The safety of piercing guns has been disputed. The Department of Health of Western Australia does not recommend their use for piercing body parts other than the lobes of ears, and the US Association of Professional Piercers recommends that piercing guns not be used for any piercing, requiring members to agree not to use piercing guns in their practice.
Cork
Cork may be placed on the opposite side of the body part being pierced to receive the needle.
Forceps
Forceps, or clamps, may be used to hold and stabilize the tissue to be pierced. Most piercings that are stabilized with forceps use the triangular-headed "Pennington" forcep, while tongues are usually stabilized with an oval-headed forcep. Most forceps have large enough openings in their jaws to permit the needle and jewelry to pass directly through, though some slotted forceps are designed with a removable segment instead for removal after the piercing. Forceps are not used in the freehand method, in which the piercer supports the tissue by hand.
Needle-receiving tubes
A needle-receiving tube is a hollow tube made of metal, shatter-resistant glass or plastic and, like forceps, is used to support the tissue at the piercing site, commonly in septum and some cartilage piercings. Not only are these tubes intended to support the tissue, but they also receive the needle once it has passed through the tissue, offering protection from the sharp point. Needle receiving tubes are not used in the freehand piercing method.
Anaesthesia
Anaesthesia is supplied by some piercers, particularly in the United Kingdom and Europe. The anaesthesia may be topical or injected. In some other places, piercers and other non-medical personnel are not legally permitted to administer anaesthetics.

== Risks associated with body piercing ==
Two models of Statim autoclaves shown above are commonly found in professional piercing studios, that use pulsing steam under pressure to sterilize body jewellery and equipment immediately prior to use.

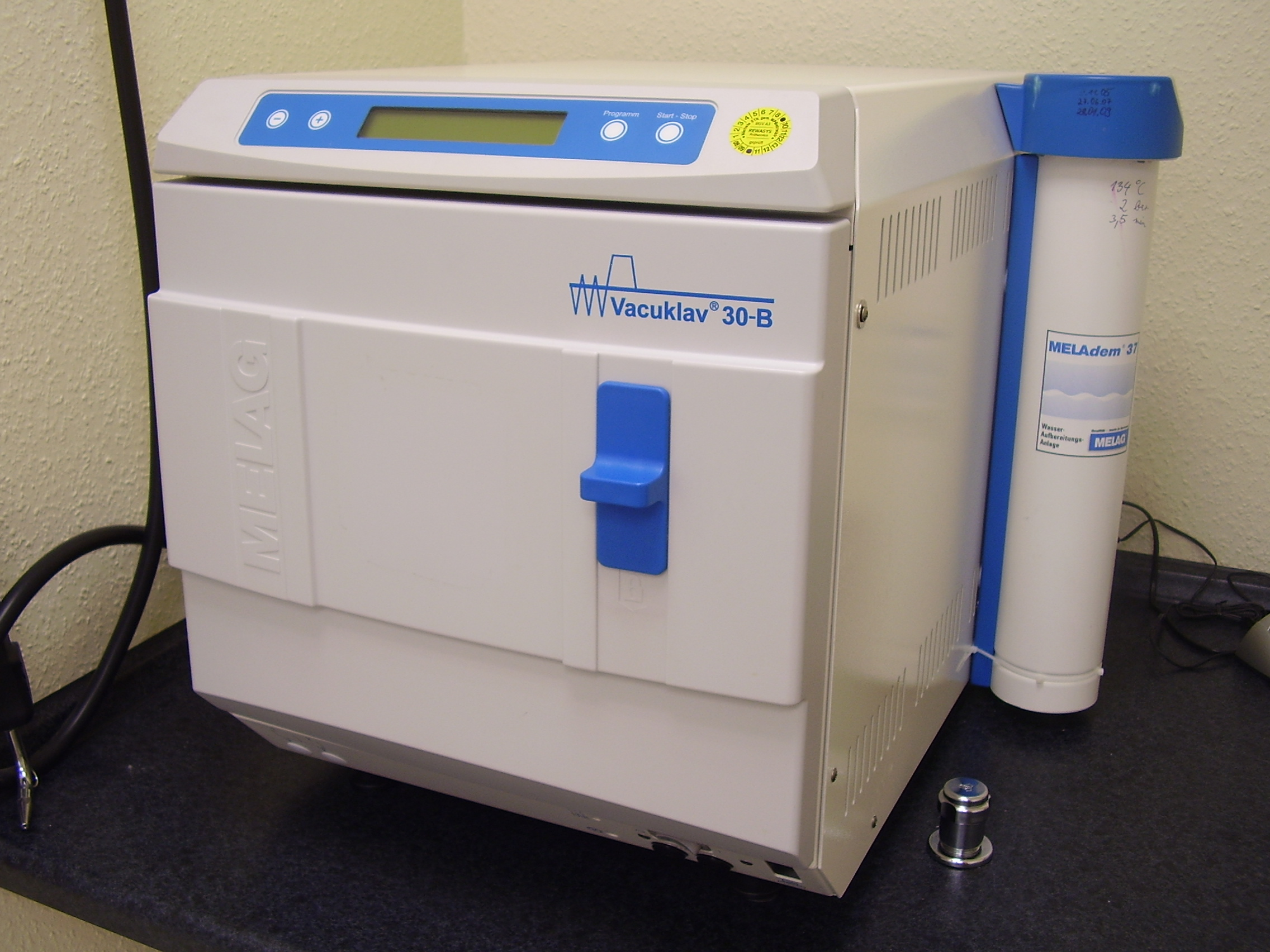
Autoclaves such as this one are standard equipment in professional piercing studios, helping to prevent infection. This type uses a vacuum pump to remove air from the chamber before sterilizing sealed packages of items for later use.

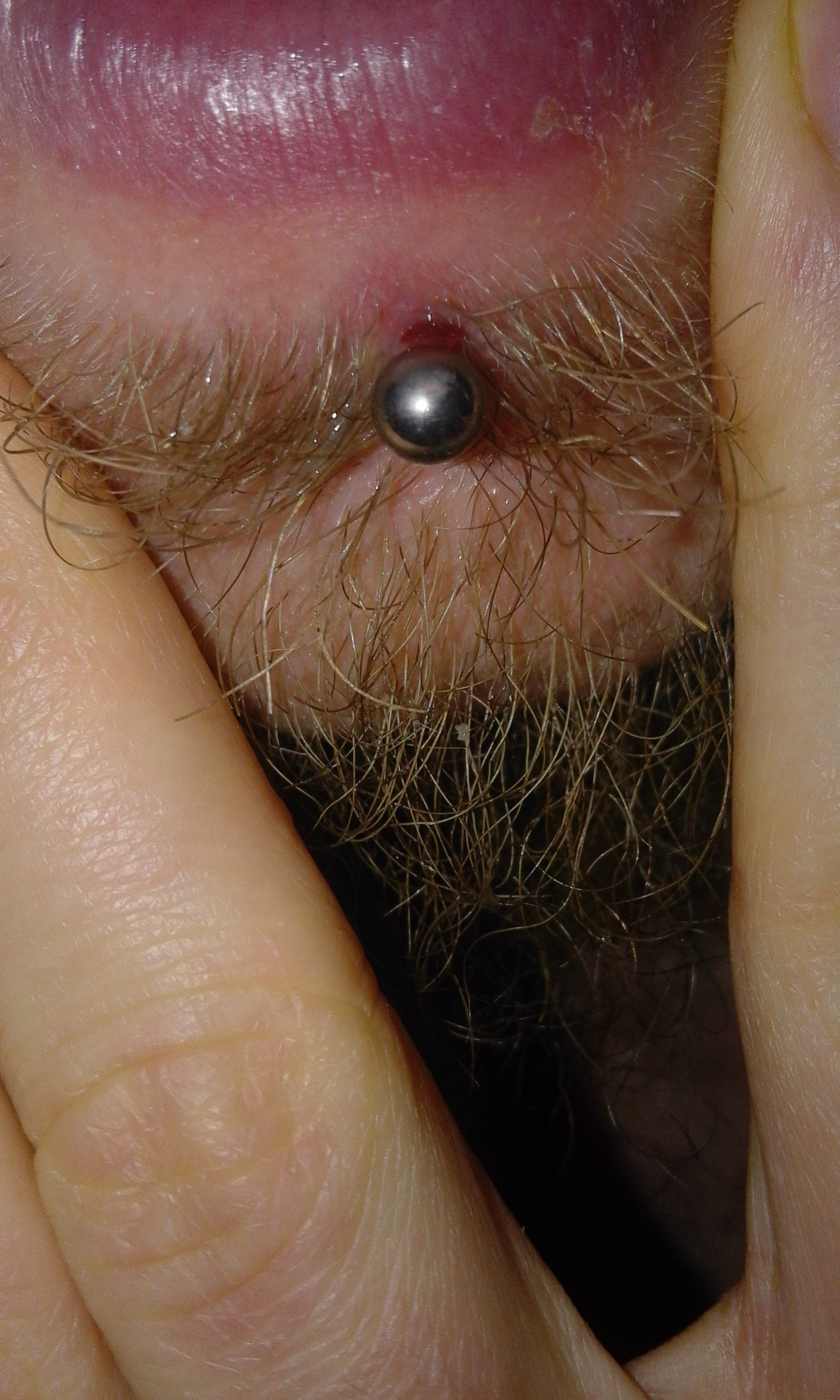
Hypertrophic scar that developed on the lip seven weeks after piercing it

Body piercing is an invasive procedure with risks. In a 2005 survey of 10,503 persons over the age of 16 in England, complications were reported in 31% of piercings, with professional help being necessary in 15.2%. 0.9% had complications serious enough to require hospitalization.

Some risks of note include:

- Allergic reaction to the metal in the piercing jewelry, particularly nickel. This risk can be minimized by using high quality jewelry manufactured from titanium or niobium or similar inert metals. Metal piercing jewelry puts metal in contact with damaged skin, increasing the risk of developing a metal allergy; this is thought to be why such allergies are more common in women.
- Infection, bacterial or viral, particularly from Staphylococcus aureus, group A streptococcus and Pseudomonas spp. Reports at the 16th European Congress of Clinical Microbiology and Infectious Diseases in 2006 indicated that bacterial infections are seldom serious, but that ten to twenty percent of piercings result in local benign bacterial infection. The Mayo Clinic estimates 30%. Risk of infection is greatest among those with congenital heart disease, who have a much higher chance of developing life-threatening infective endocarditis, hemophiliacs and diabetics, as well as those taking corticosteroids. In 2006, a diabetic woman in Indiana lost a breast due to an infection from a nipple piercing. Viral infections may include hepatitis B, hepatitis C and, potentially, HIV, although as of 2009 there had been no documented cases of HIV caused by piercing. While rare, infection due to piercing of the tongue can be fatal. Higher prevalence of colonization of Candida albicans was reported in young individuals with tongue piercing, in comparison to non-tongue-pierced matched individuals.
- Excess scar tissue, including hypertrophic scar and keloid formation. While piercings can be removed, they may leave a hole, mark or scar.
- Physical trauma including tearing, friction or bumping of the piercing site, which may cause edema and delay healing. The risks can be minimized by wearing properly sized jewelry and not changing it unnecessarily, by not touching the piercing more than required for aftercare, and by being conscious of environmental factors (such as clothing) that may impact the piercing.
- Oral trauma, including recession of gingival tissue and dental fracture and wear. Recession of gingival tissue affects 19% to 68% of subjects with lip and/or intra-oral ornaments. In some cases, the alveolar tooth-bearing bone is also involved, jeopardizing the stability and durability of the teeth in place and requiring a periodontal regeneration surgery. Dental fracture and wear affects 14% to 41% of subjects with lip and/or intra-oral ornaments.

Contemporary body piercing studios generally take numerous precautions to protect the health of the person being pierced and the piercer. Piercers are expected to sanitize the location to be pierced as well as their hands, even though they will often wear gloves during the procedure (and in some areas must, as it is prescribed by law). Quite frequently, these gloves will be changed multiple times, often one pair for each step of setup to avoid cross contamination. For example, after a piercer wearing gloves has cleaned the area to be pierced on a client, the piercer may change gloves to avoid recontaminating the area. Wearing sterile gloves is required by law for professional piercing procedures in some areas, such as the states of Florida and South Carolina. Tools and jewelry should be sterilized in autoclaves, and non-autoclavable surfaces should be cleaned with disinfectant agents on a regular basis and between clients.

In addition, the Association of Professional Piercers recommends classes in First Aid in blood-borne pathogens as part of professional training.

=== The healing process and body piercing aftercare ===
Dried sebum deposit on body jewelry

The aftercare process for body piercing has evolved gradually through practice, and many myths and harmful recommendations persist. A reputable piercing studio should provide clients with written and verbal aftercare instructions, as is in some areas mandated by law.

The healing process of piercings is broken down into three stages:

- The inflammatory phase, during which the wound is open and bleeding, inflammation and tenderness are all to be expected;
- The growth or proliferative phase, during which the body produces cells and protein to heal the puncture and the edges contract around the piercing, forming a tunnel of scar tissue called a fistula. This phase may last weeks, months, or longer than a year.
- The maturation or remodeling phase, as the cells lining the piercing strengthen and stabilize. This stage takes months or years to complete.

It is normal for a white or slightly yellow discharge to be noticeable on the jewelry, as the sebaceous glands produce an oily substance meant to protect and moisturize the wound. While these sebum deposits may be expected for some time, only a small amount of pus, which is a sign of inflammation or infection, should be expected, and only within the initial phase. While sometimes difficult to distinguish, sebum is "more solid and cheeselike and has a distinctive rotten odour", according to The Piercing Bible.

The amount of time it typically takes a piercing to heal varies widely according to the placement of the piercing. Genital piercings can be among the quicker to heal, with piercings of the clitoral hood and Prince Albert piercings healing in as little as a month, though some may take longer. Navel piercings can be the slowest to heal, with one source reporting a range of six months to two full years. The prolonged healing of navel piercings may be connected to clothing friction.

== See also ==
- Body jewelry sizes
- Body piercing regulation in the UK
- Corset piercing
- Genital piercing
- List of body piercings
- Play piercing
- Suspension piercing
