= Body piercing regulation in the UK =

Regulations surrounding body piercing in the UK

In the UK, the body piercing industry is largely unregulated. Body piercing studios must be licensed but there are no national standards to reduce health risks or specific requirements for professional competence, leading to concerns over infection and proper practice.

== Laws and guidelines ==
Unlike tattoos, there is no minimum age for most piercings in England, Wales and Northern Ireland. In Scotland, under-16s must have a parent or guardian's assistance and the parent or guardian must be present during the piercing. In Wales, it is an offence to pierce or arrange to pierce the tongue, genitals or nipples of under-18s.

In 2013, a tattooing and piercing guidance toolkit was released, aiming to promote national safety and consistency across the industry by informing local authorities and businesses about good standards of practice. This toolkit was endorsed by the Chartered Institute of Environmental Health (CIEH), Public Health England (PHE), the Health and Safety Laboratory (HSL), and the Tattoo and Piercing Industry Union (TPIU). It addressed health concerns such as the risk of transmission of blood-borne viruses.

== Considered regulation ==
Wales is the only UK country planning a compulsory licensing scheme for tattoo parlours and piercing studios. The legislative work for this scheme was due to be brought in during 2020, but the scheme was delayed by Brexit and the COVID-19 pandemic. Under this legislation, technicians who have a poor history of infection would be prevented from moving counties and setting up new businesses.

In 2011, the Welsh government proposed that under-16s should not be allowed to have cosmetic piercings without their parents' permission; however, this was not implemented.

== Public opinion ==
In a poll of 1,739 adults in Great Britain by YouGov conducted in October 2011, 52% thought there should be a minimum age of 16-years-old to get an ear piercing without parental consent in England and Wales, while 16% thought the age should be 18 and over, 13% thought the age should be 14-years-old and over, 6% said 12 years and over, and 5% said there should be no age of consent on ear piercings (other responses were below 5%). In regards to piercings on other parts of the body, 41% stated the minimum age should be 18 and over, 39% said 16 and over, and 10% said 21 and over (other responses were below 5%).
