= Scalpelling =

Body art procedure

Scalpelling is a form of body modification involving the creation of decorative perforations through the skin and other body tissue via scalpel.

The technique can immediately produce holes with a larger diameter than can be achieved by body piercing, allowing for the wearing of large gauge body jewellery.

The wounds associated with scalpelling are large.

Scalpelling is a fairly new body modification technique, and is still quite rare. It is most commonly performed on earlobes, but can also be used for such modifications as labrets.

Scalpelling should not be confused with a form of scarification, whereby images are inscribed in a person's skin using a scalpel.

== Risks ==
Because of the skill required by scalpelling and the danger associated with additional blood loss, scalpelling by piercers is not legal in some jurisdictions.

One potentially negative effect of scalpelling is that the holes created by the process are less likely to close naturally over time than those from stretched piercings. Though it is still possible in some cases, especially at smaller sizes, it is far more likely that an unwanted hole would have to be closed surgically.
