= Hoop =

Hoop or Hoops may refer to:

== Arts and entertainment ==
=== Film and television ===
- Hoops (TV series), an American animated series

=== Characters ===
Hoops, a pink cat from Hallmark Media's Hoops & Yoyo

=== Music ===
- Hoops (band), an American indie pop band
- Hoops (album), a 2015 album by The Rubens
  - "Hoops" (The Rubens song)
- "Hoops" (Ruby song), 1996
- "Hoops", a song by Saweetie, Salt-N-Pepa and Kash Doll from the Space Jam: A New Legacy soundtrack

=== Video games ===
- Dunk Dream '95, a sequel to the game Street Slam that was known as Hoops in North America
- Hoops (1986 video game), a 1986 college basketball video game
- Hoops (1988 video game), a 1988 basketball video game

== Sports ==
=== Basketball ===
- Basketball, also referred to as hoops
- Hoop (magazine), an American basketball magazine
- Hoops Club, a Lebanese basketball club
- Shamrock Rovers Hoops, an Irish basketball club

=== Football ===
- Celtic F.C., Scotland, nicknamed the Hoops
- Shamrock Rovers F.C., Ireland, nicknamed the Hoops
- Queens Park Rangers F.C., London, nicknamed the Hoops

=== Other sports ===
- Hoop (rhythmic gymnastics), an apparatus in rhythmic gymnastics
- Hoop rolling, a sport and child's game played since antiquity

== Other uses ==
- Embroidery hoop
- Hoop (surname)
- Hoop (East Indiaman), a Dutch sail ship sunk in 1605
- Hooping, a modern subculture revolving around hoopdance
- HOOPS 3D Graphics System, a 3D Graphics API, part of The HOOPS 3D Application Framework
- A barrel component
- Hoop earrings
- The rim of a drum

== See also ==
- Hula Hoop (disambiguation)
- De Hoop (disambiguation)
- The Hoops (disambiguation)
- Hooper (disambiguation)
- Hoopers (disambiguation)
- Loop (disambiguation)
