= Van der Hoop =

van der Hoop is a Dutch surname. Here, van der is a tussenvoegsel (surname afffix) and hoop means 'heap', 'knoll' or a populated place named Hoop. Notable people with the surname include:

- Adriaan van der Hoop (1778–1854), Dutch banker and art collector whose collection laid the basis for the Rijksmuseum
- Joan Cornelis van der Hoop (1742–1825), Dutch lawyer and politician, father of Adriaan (1778–1854)
- Johannes Hermanus van der Hoop (1887–1950), Dutch psychiatrist

== See also ==
- Hoop (surname)
