= Infant ear piercing =

Body modification practice

Ear piercing is one of the oldest forms of body modification. It occurs when holes are created on the ear lobes or cartilage to allow the insertion of decorative ornaments, such as earrings. Ear piercing in children has been around for centuries as part of ritualistic and cultural traditions but has continued to become a worldwide mainstream fashion statement. It is extremely common in Nigeria, India, Brazil and Hispanic countries.

Due to the pain and health risks associated with baby ear piercing, critics characterize it as a form of child abuse and have called for bans of the procedure.

== Petitions ==
In the United States and the United Kingdom, the issue of whether or not parents and primary caregivers should consent to baby ear piercing is currently a hot debate. According to a petition-making website 38 Degrees, Susan Ingram implores the U.K. Minister of State for Children and Families to set a minimum age requirement for ear piercing and make the practice illegal. She claims that pierced ears is equivalent to physical abuse and child cruelty for the fear and pain inflicted. To this day, to pierce or not to pierce a baby's ears, like many other aesthetic decision, is still firmly a parental prerogative.

== Age restrictions ==
Age restrictions, although not imposed, are not a result of medical evidence or physical complication, but rather to protect babies from potential risks in piercing their ears too early. Newborn infants have extremely small earlobes and the probability of misplaced piercings and infections would be higher. The immune system is also still developing, therefore creating a wound can open up the opportunity for infections. Infants are unable to consent to having the procedure. By piercing their ears, parents are taking away the child's opportunity to have such a choice. Additionally, pediatricians from the American Academy of Pediatrics (AAP) require parents to wait until their child is at least 6 months old to get their ears pierced. The older the child, the more likely that they will be taking responsibility for keeping their ears clean of infection.

== Precautions ==
=== Medical ear piercing ===
Dermatologists or pediatricians offer medical ear piercing services on a fee-for-service charge. The professional ensures a truly sterile process for sanitation and follow basic safety protocols. Prior to piercing, the area to be punctured is thoroughly clean with an alcohol pad and pierced with a single-use sterile tool from its previously unopened packaging to prevent cross-contamination. Furthermore, the American Academy of Pediatrics (AAP) stated that if the piercing is performed in a sterile environment and is cared for, there is little risk.

=== Pain relief ===
Ear piercing will always be somewhat painful, even if it is over in a matter of seconds. Dermatologists or pediatricians can prescribe a topical numbing with lidocaine derivatives or apply ice to anesthetize and numb the pain receptors in the earlobes to reduce sensation. According to a journal article in Behaviour Research and Therapy, children often under predict their pain on their ears and reported significant procedural pain and anxiety.

== Health risks ==
=== Mental health ===
Piercings in children have been seen in religious and cultural ceremonies around the world. A national study of students showed that those with a single ear piercing can symbol a badge of identity or a sign of rebellion, leading to further body modification activities, such as more body piercings, tattoos, daring clothing, and extreme hairstyles.

This causal relationship is very difficult to prove i.e. girls with piercings were two and a half times more likely than other girls to have used marijuana and to have smoked cigarettes in the past month. Some take this even further and state that ear piercing may lead to more body piercing, which serves as a marker for peer substance abuse, potential problem behavior associated with sexual intercourse, truancy, running away from home, and suicidal ideation.

=== Physical health ===
==== Infections ====
Redness, swelling, itching, pain, and/or tenderness are all signs of possible infection. The risk of an ear piercing becoming infected is the highest during warm weather and shortly after the piercing has taken place. Case studies show that normal ear piercing infections may develop into serious infections caused by Pseudomonas and Staphylococcus, which are reported at rates of 10–30%. Although rare, there is also a theoretical risk of viral infection with hepatitis B, C, and HIV, if ears are pierced by contaminated tools. Furthermore, infected deep soft tissue and abscess at the site of infection have to be surgically drained or it can lead to ear deformities.

==== Allergic reactions ====
At a recent seminar sponsored by the American Academy of Dermatology, Alexander Fisher of New York University said that metal allergies are activated after a trauma to the skin. Such allergies, with visible symptoms, such as an itchy rash, weeping skin, pain, and in extreme cases, bleeding and pus, are most often caused by exposure to nickel and cobalt. These are common allergens present in quality jewelry as well as in cheap costume jewelry. A baby can easily develop a condition called contact dermatitis from skin contact with material they have become sensitised to. To avoid metal allergies, Fisher recommends that ears be pierced only with stainless steel or titanium needle.

==== Keloids ====
Keloids are raised, reddened, fibrous growths that usually occur after surgical procedures or trauma and can cause significant cosmetic deformity. The ear is one of the most common sites of keloid formation, usually associated with the wearing of earrings caused by ear piercing. The scars, which usually take form of an inappropriately hard lump of tissue, are larger than the initial wound. There is still no definite treatment protocol described for keloids due to an incomplete understanding of the pathogenesis of its formation. Even if it is surgically removed, keloid recurrence rate ranges from 40–100% of the population.
