= Franz Josef Hoop =

Franz Josef Hoop may refer to:

- Franz Josef Hoop (politician, born 1819) (1819–1902), Mayor of Gamprin
- Franz Josef Hoop (politician, born 1861) (1861–1925), Mayor of Ruggell and member of the Landtag of Liechtenstein
- Josef Hoop (1898–1959), Prime Minister of Liechtenstein

== See also ==
- Hoop (surname)
