= Ear piercing instrument =

Device to pierce earlobes

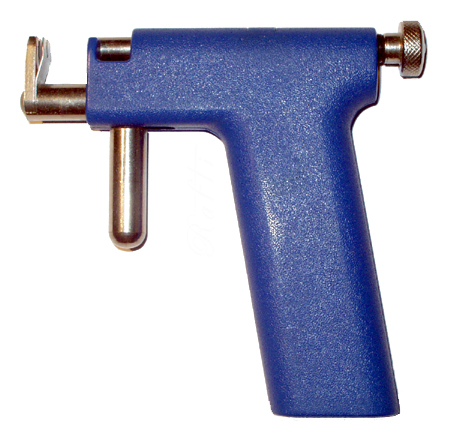
A piercing gun

An ear-piercing instrument (commonly referred to as a piercing gun or an ear-piercing gun) is a device designed to pierce earlobes by driving a pointed starter stud through the lobe. Piercing guns are typically used for ear piercing in mall jewelry shops, beauty salons, pharmacies, and doctors' offices.

Piercing guns have been widely criticized as dangerous among professional body piercers. The use of older designs of piercing gun can possibly carry an increased risk of disease transmission, as compared to methods used by professional piercers. Piercing guns have been criticised for causing damage (sometimes mischaracterised as blunt-force trauma) to the skin and underlying tissue. Diminished air and blood circulation in tissue compressed by a piercing gun can lead to prolonged healing, minor complications and scarring.

More modern designs of reusable ear-piercing instruments, such as Inverness and Studex System 75, use self-contained, single-use, sealed, and sterilised disposable cartridges or cassettes. The studs used with such systems often have thinner posts (normally 20 gauge) with sharper tips, as opposed to the thicker (16 gauge), blunter posts of the "standard" ear-piercing guns. This makes the piercing somewhat less painful, and lessens trauma to the skin and tissue, but may still cause more trauma compared to hollow needles used by professional body piercers. Modern ear-piercing studs are also more likely to be made from materials certified as safe for long-term implant in the human body, such as titanium.

== Design and use ==
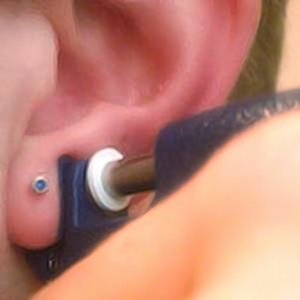
An ear being pierced with a piercing gun

=== Traditional model ===
The older designs of ear-piercing gun, which came widely into use in the 1970s but are still in widespread use (e.g., "Studex Universal") employ a spring that stores potential energy when the instrument is "cocked" ready for piercing by pulling back a plunger.

The starter studs and friction clasps that are used with these instruments typically come in pairs, in sealed, sterilized packages. The studs have a pointed tip designed to pierce the earlobe rapidly when the trigger mechanism is released, and a "shoulder" to hold the clasp in place, and to maintain appropriate spacing between the clasp and the stud head, such that the earlobe is not squeezed while healing. The studs are slightly thicker, 16-gauge, and are made of surgical steel, 24 karat gold-plated steel, 14-karat gold, or titanium.

To conduct the ear piercing, the instrument is first cocked by drawing the plunger back. The piercer inserts the head of one of the pair of starter studs selected by the client into an adapter in the barrel in the body of the instrument, and the clasp is slid into the clasp retainer at the front of the instrument. The piercer then positions the client's earlobe between the point of the stud and the clasp retainer, and squeezes the instrument closed such that the tip of the stud is aligned with the mark where the piercing is to be placed, and to hold the earlobe in place during the piercing. When the alignment of the stud is correct, the piercer releases the trigger, and the force of the spring causes the instrument to fire with considerable pressure, snapping the plunger forward, pushing the point of the stud rapidly through the earlobe, and engaging it with the clasp behind the earlobe, completing the ear piercing. As necessary, the procedure is repeated to pierce the other ear.

The older designs of ear-piercing gun cannot easily be sterilized, which led to the development of more modern systems that employ single-use, disposable cartridges.

=== Disposable-cartridge designs ===
An ear-piercing gun employing a disposable cartridge

Most newer models of piercing guns use a disposable cartridge, sometimes called a "cassette". With these models, the stud holder and clasp holder are fully disposable. In some parts of the world, this modification is either specifically required (e.g., in Scotland) or implied by Health and Safety legislation.

=== Standalone piercing cartridges ===
A common form of piercing cartridges, especially in online stores such as Amazon and Temu are standalone cartridges designed to be used by hand, rather than within a piercing gun. The cartridges use the manual force of the user pushing the needle into the earlobe or nostril by hand, rather than a gun automatically applying pressure. Some piercers refer to them as "piercing cartridges", while others refer to them alongside other piercing guns.

Certain more modern piercing gun designs, such as Inverness 2000 and Studex System 75, work with piercing studs housed in disposable, single-use cassettes, combining the piercing gun with a piercing cartridge. These sterilized cartridges are loaded into the instrument without the operator touching either the studs or the clasps; sufficient force to pierce the ear rapidly is attained when the stud breaks apart its plastic mount inside the cassette. The ease of operation, the greater variety of stud designs (different materials, jewels, settings, and shapes), and the relative painlessness of the piercing, and the absence of a sudden "snap" facilitated by such instruments is likely to have contributed to the widespread increase in popularity in ear piercing since the late 20th century, and in trends such as multiple piercing, piercing among both sexes and in younger children, and the abandonment of the perception of ear piercing as an ordeal.

Another design for a hand-pressure ear-piercing instrument is Coren, sometimes referred to as a "piercing stapler". This design comprises of a small U-shaped plastic holder pre-loaded with a standard 16-gauge ear-piercing stud in one arm of the device and the clasp in the other. To pierce the ear, the operator closes the instrument around the earlobe, aligning the point of the stud with the mark for the desired placement of the piercing, and squeezes a plastic plunger with sufficient pressure to break two plastic flanges on either side of the plunger, forcing the stud rapidly through the earlobe, and engaging the stud with the clasp behind the earlobe. The used instrument is then discarded.

== Criticism ==
Ear-piercing "guns" have been widely criticized in the body piercing community, which advocates piercing with needles. Shannon Larratt, editor and publisher of BME and a vocal critic of the piercing gun, penned an essay titled Piercing guns are blasphemy!, where he described the piercing gun as an inherently flawed, dangerous instrument that should never be used. Larratt also printed T-shirts which featured an image of a piercing gun with a red circle and line through it, to mean No Piercing Guns. BME also published an article titled Do Piercing Guns Suck?.

=== Use on areas other than the ear lobe ===
While they are sometimes used for this purpose, ear-piercing guns were not originally designed to pierce through the cartilage of the upper ear, or to pierce any part of the body other than the earlobe. Some U.S. states and some European countries have banned piercing guns for use on ear cartilage and nostrils. Improper use of ear-piercing instruments on areas of the body not intended for their use can lead to problems with healing and placement. Ear-piercing studs can be too short or wrongly shaped for the tissue, especially for oral piercings, and can lead to problems with "embedding" in which the wound effectively heals over it. In some cases this has necessitated surgical removal of the stud and can lead to abscesses, infection and scarring. For other body piercings, the gauge of the studs used by piercing guns is too narrow and can lead to tearing and other trauma that expose the body to infection and can cause permanent scarring.

At home piercing kits using cartridges and the affordability of piercing guns has led to injuries, deformities and scarring in users. In an interview with BBC, a professional piercer stated the consequences of using these piercing kits "can range from maybe uneven lobes to a completely shattered helix or tragus". Kids and teens improperly using this equipment run the risk of ruining their ears. Sites like Amazon, Shein and Temu allow for piercing guns and kits to be purchased for under $10, with some products even costing as little as $2. Some professional piercers and advocates suggest lowering the age limit for ear piercings in areas with higher limits, in order to give a more professional alternative to teenagers interested in body modification.

== Gallery ==
Starter studs in packaging. Such studs can be used only with older designs of ear-piercing guns.

Lateral view of an ear pierced with a standard "starter" stud. Note the pointed tip of the stud. The butterfly clasp is resting in a groove in the post.

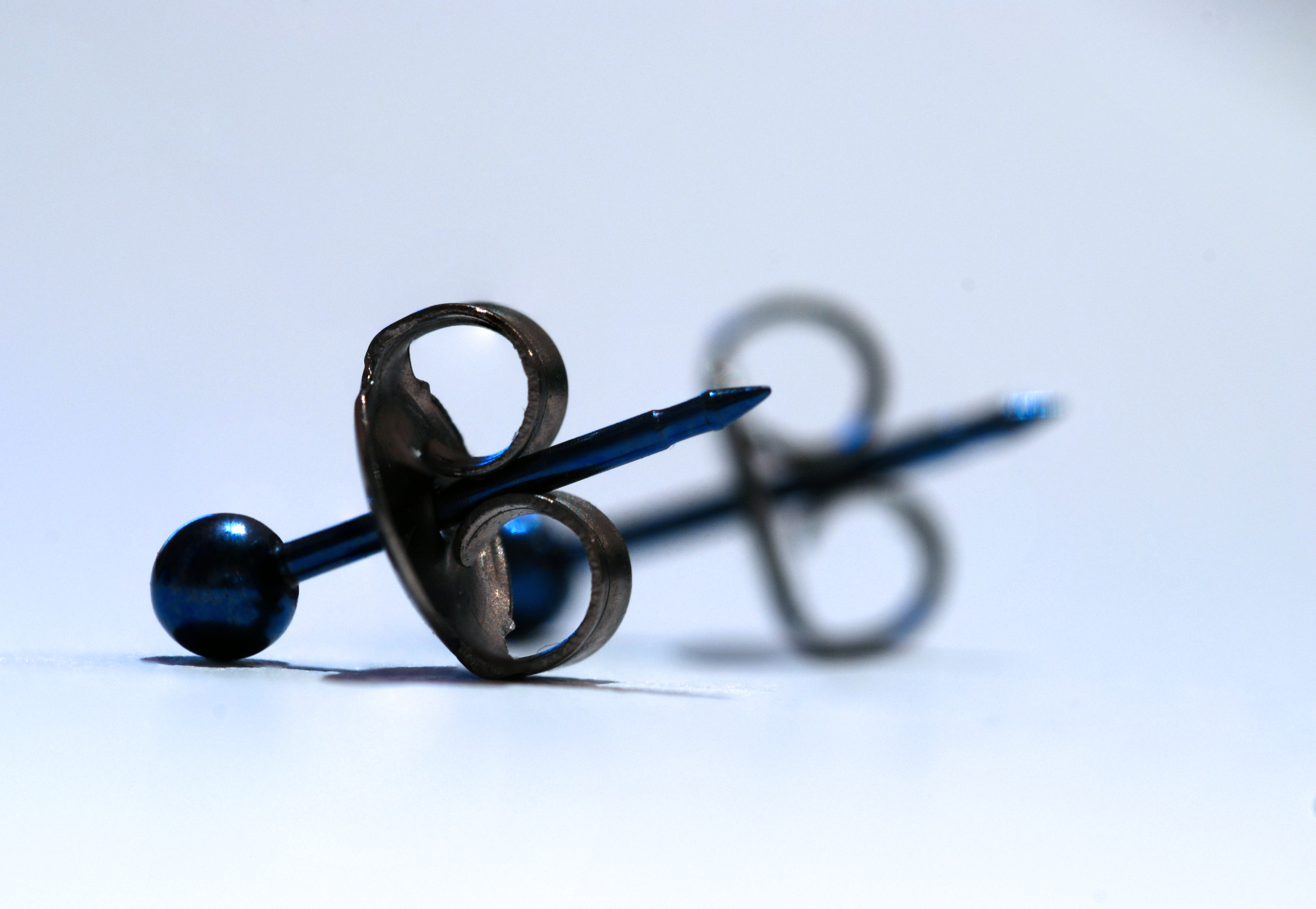
Starter studs. The tip of the stud is pointed, and the post features a groove for the clasp to sit with appropriate spacing so as not to squeeze the earlobe.

== See also ==
- Earring
- Body piercing
- Body modification
