= Jhumka (disambiguation) =

Jhumka may refer to:

- Jhumka, a city in the Sunsari District, Nepal
- Jhumka (earring style), an earring style in Indian jewellery
- Jhumka Dam, a dam in the Chandaka Elephant Sanctuary, Odisha, India
- "Jhumka Gira Re", a song by Madan Mohan and Asha Bhosle from the 1966 Indian film Mera Saaya
