= Hula Hoop (disambiguation) =

A hula hoop is a toy hoop that is twirled around the waist, limbs or neck.

Hula Hoop may also refer to:

== Television ==
- "Hula Hoop", an episode of the TV series Pocoyo

== Music ==
- "The Hula Hoop Song", a 1958 single by Georgia Gibbs
- "Hula Hoop Song", a 1958 single by Maureen Evans
- "Hula Hoop" (Omi song), 2015
- "Hula Hoop" (Loona song), 2021
- "Hula Hoop", a song by Stella Mwangi from the 2011 album Kinanda

== Other uses ==
- Hula Hoops, a snack food

== See also ==
- Hulahop d.o.o., a Croatian company
