= The Hoops =

The Hoops

This might refer to any of the following:

- Celtic F.C., a Scottish association football team
- Shamrock Rovers F.C., an Irish association football team
- Queens Park Rangers F.C., an English association football team
- FC Dallas, a United States-based soccer team that play in Major League Soccer (MLS)
- Hoops (band), an American indie pop band active from 2015 to 2018

== See also ==
- Hoop (disambiguation), including uses of "Hoops"
