= Orbital piercing =

Type of double hole body piercing

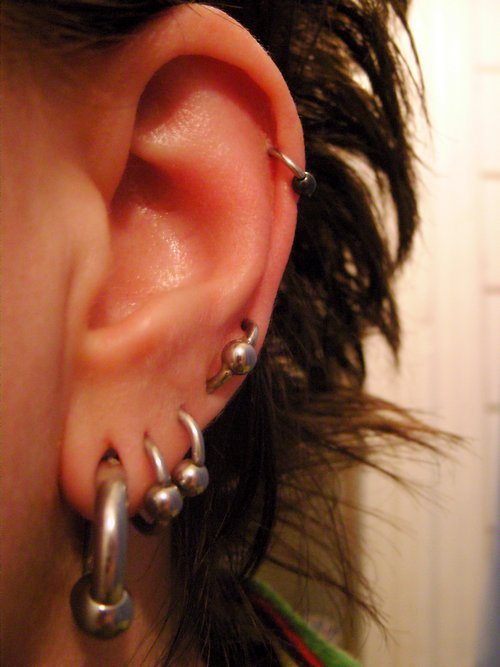
Orbital piercing, second from the top

An orbital piercing is a combination of two ear piercings connected by one piece of jewelry. While usually located in the helix region of the ear, an orbital piercing can be done anywhere on the body including the earlobes. The piercing uses a hoop, and is not to be confused with an industrial piercing, a conch piercing or double cartilage piercing.

== Process ==
A professional piercer will use a sterilized hollowed gauge needle, a captive bead ring for jewelry, and a pair of pliers.

The piercer will take a marker and mark the placement of the desired piercing. They will then take the hollow gauge needle and insert it through the marked position. With the needle still inserted, ear the piercer will take the captive bead ring and slide in the hollow part of the needle, gently pulling the needle through the rest of the ear with the captive bead still in the needle. Once the jewelry is placed correctly, the piercer will repeat the process, except this time they will not insert a new captive ring. Using the newly made second hole, the piercer will take the bead ring in the first hole and place it through the second hole. They then close the ring until there is very little space left for the bead to fit in the ring. Once the bead is placed and secured in the ring, the piercing is completed.

== Types ==
There are many types of orbital piercings, as an orbital piercing is simply two or more piercing sites connected by a single piece of rounded jewelry, usually a ring. Three of the most common types are:

- Lobe orbital piercing
- Anti helix piercing
- Helix orbital piercing

Some orbital piercings connect three or more piercing sites with a single ring, such as an orbital piercing that connects the daith, rook, and forward helix.
