= Hoopers =

Hoopers may refer to:

- Hoopers (department store), a British retailer
- The Hoopers, Japanese musicians
- Rivers Hoopers, a Nigerian basketball team
- People who practice hooping

== See also ==
- Hooper (disambiguation)
