= Herring earring =

Catalan jewellery

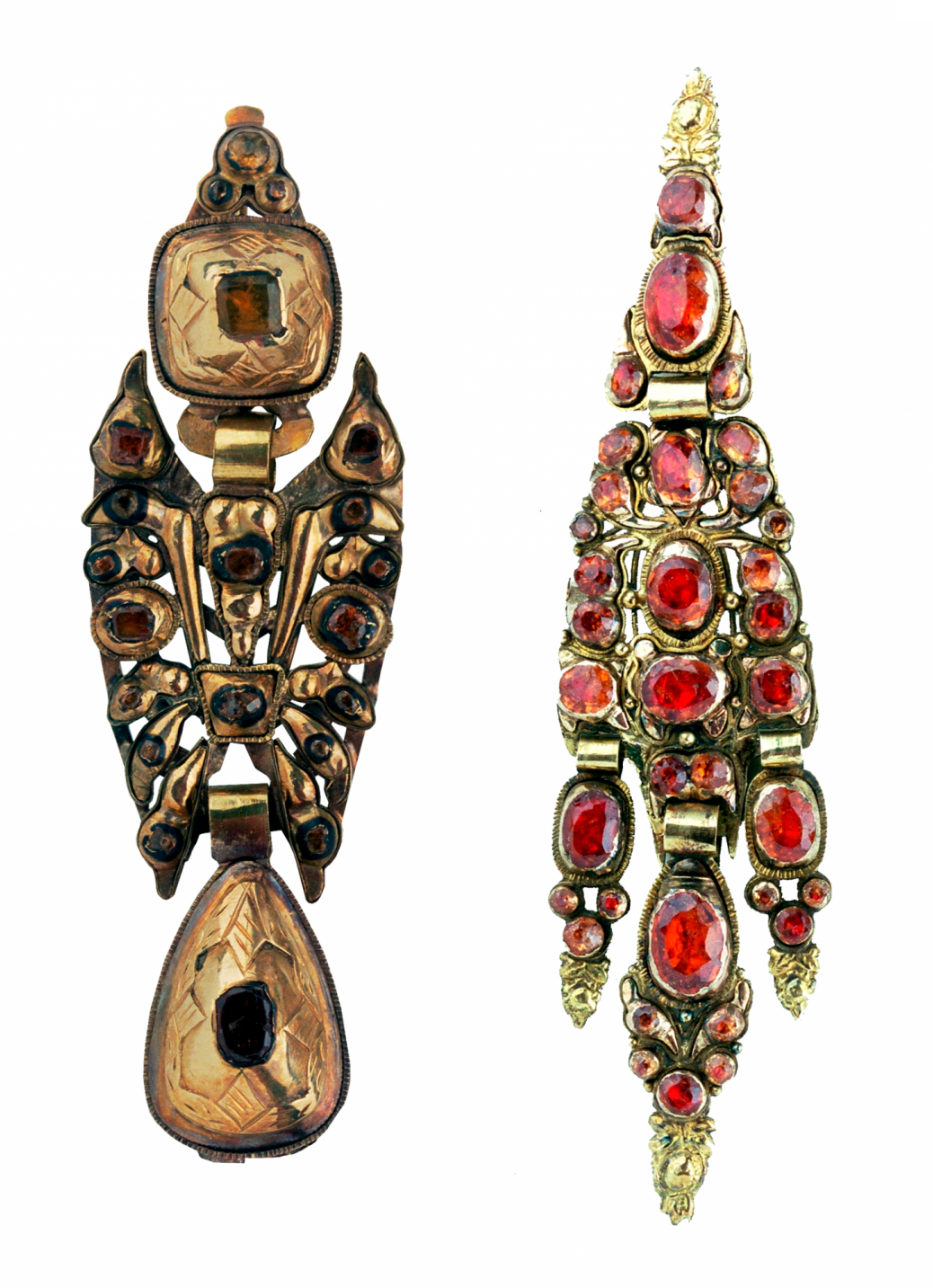
Two types of Catalan-herring earring from the 19th century

The herring earring (in Catalan, arracada d'arengada), also known as Jacsins or nanny earring (arracada de dida), are the names given in jewellery to the traditional type of earring typical from Catalonia since the middle of the 18th century and with a prominent success during the 19th century. It became very popular due to the designs of Josep Masriera i Vidal, a forerunner of a long lineage of Catalan goldsmiths since his first designs in 1838 with gold and emeralds. This type of earring is considered the most representative model of the Catalan jewellery.

The herring earring is mostly made of precious metals such as gold and silver and consists of several pieces. The top is a kind of a squared closing button for everyday's use and its design aims to fit the earlobe. The center of the piece, which is longer and almond-shaped, has at least three removable parts: one hanging on each side and a third one in the middle, from which sometimes a smaller one also hangs -serving as the end of the whole earring. The piece has a length between 2 and up to 15 centimeters in the most showy cases. Its silhouette resembling the typical Catalan herrings preserved in brine was the triggering for this popular alias.

This jewellery piece has always been a symbol of engagement and marriage among Catalan families. To give it more majesty, the metals are usually combined with shiny gemstones such as amethysts, emeralds, small diamonds or topazes, which confer them plant themes. In the case of those garnished with garnets, the Northern Catalonia has historically been a key place for the herring earring manufacturing.
