= Johannes Hermanus van der Hoop =

Dutch psychiatrist

Johannes Hermanus van der Hoop (29 March 1887 in Groningen – 11 October 1950) was a Dutch psychiatrist. He underwent analysis with both Carl Jung and Ruth Mack Brunswick. He was a co-founder and president of the Dutch Association for Psychotherapy. In 1929 van der Hoop was given a private lectureship in the theory of neuroses at the University of Amsterdam.

== Works ==
- Character and the unconscious: a critical exposition of the psychology of Freud and of Jung, 1921. Translated from the Dutch by Elizabeth Trevelyan. The International Library of Psychology, Philosophy and Scientific Method.
- Conscious orientation: a study of personality types in relation to neurosis and psychosis, London: Kegan Paul, Trench, Trubner & Co., 1939. Translated by Laura Hutton from the German Bewusstseinstypen und ihre Beziehung zur Psychopathologie (1937).
