= Hoop (surname) =

Hoop is a German and Dutch surname derived from the word hoop, 'heap', 'pile', 'knoll', 'group of people' (Middle Low German: hōp, hope, hoppe, hupe) In most cases it is a topographic surname for a person who lived on/by a knoll. In some cases it derives from the nickname based on the meaning "assembly" or as a toponymic surname derived from any of places named Hoop. Notable people with the surname include:

- Franz Josef Hoop (politician, born 1861) (1861–1925), Liechtenstein politician
- Franz Xaver Hoop (1886–1960), Liechtenstein politician
- Martin Hoop (1892–1933), German politician
- Josef Hoop (1895–1959), Prime Minister of Liechtenstein
- Wyn Hoop (born 1936), German singer
- Gregor Hoop (born 1964), Liechtenstein alpine skier
- Ronald Hoop (born 1967), Dutch-Surinamese footballer
- Karin Zech-Hoop (born 1973), Liechtenstein politician
- Jesca Hoop (born 1975), American singer-songwriter and guitarist
- Imbi Hoop (born 1988), Estonian footballer
- Franziska Hoop (born 1990), Liechtenstein politician

== See also ==
- Van der Hoop
