= Hulahop d.o.o. =

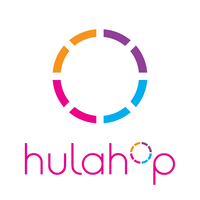
Logo of Hulahop d.o.o.

Hulahop d.o.o. is a Croatian ltd. company working in film production and cultural services. Hulahop was founded in 2006 by Dana Budisavljević and Olinka Vištica coming from the years of experience in producing films in Factum and organizing prominent film festivals in Croatia Motovun Film Festival and ZagrebDox.

This groundbreaking all-female production house soon became the leading producer of the most diverse independent film productions from intimate biopics to documentary TV series on modernist architecture heritage in Croatia. As of 2007, they are also the organizers and producers of the internationally renowned Zagreb Animation Festival with Vanja Kaluđerić (initially Human Rights Film Festival and now director of Rotterdam Film Festival).

In 2019 Hulahop released its first feature film, The Diary of Diana B. which was cinema released in Croatia and the region with 65,000 viewers and also produced its multimedia website From Film to Museum.

== Films produced and co-produced ==
- Dnevnik Diane Budisavljević (2019.)
- Htjeli smo radnike, a došli su nam ljudi
- Lijepo mi je s tobom, znaš / I Like That Super Most the Best (Eva Kraljević, 2015)
- Nije ti život pjesma Havaja / Family Meals (Dana Budisavljević, 2012)
- Odavde do Tralala
- Ona koja priča sa životinjama
- Onda vidim Tanju
- Slučajno
- U slučaju rata / When the War Comes (Jan Gebert, 2018)
- Zemlja znanja

== Series ==
- Zagreb episode of the series Food Markets (Stefano Tealdi, 2015)
- 30 episodes of the series Changing the World (2007–2011)
- 2 seasons of the TV docu series Slumbering Concrete (Saša Ban, 2016–2018)
