= Jhumka (earring style) =

Type of earring worn in India

Jhumkas are bell-shaped earrings that originated in ancient India . They are traditionally worn in India, Pakistan, Bangladesh, Sri Lanka and Nepal

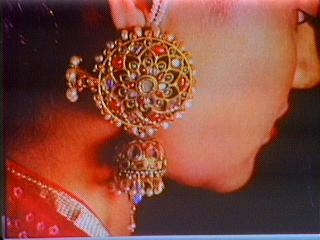

== Origins and evolution ==
Jhumka's origins are traced to the carved jewellery on sculptures of Chola Dynasty temples in South India. It is also worn as a decorative earring by traditional dancers during the performance of Bharatanatyam. Under the Mughal Empire, the jhumka underwent further evolution to make the design more opulent. The jhumka has remained one of the most popular types of jewellery in India, Pakistan, Bangladesh, Sri Lanka, and Nepal.

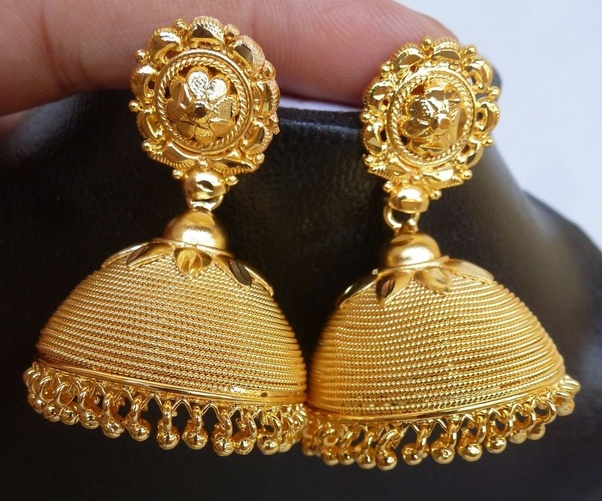
