= Hooper =

Hooper may refer to:

== People ==
- Hooper (surname)

== Places in the United States ==
- Hooper, Colorado, town in Alamosa County, Colorado
- Hooper, Georgia, an unincorporated community
- Hooper, Nebraska, town in Dodge County, Nebraska
- Hooper, Utah, place in Weber County, Utah
- Hooper Bay, Alaska, town in Alaska
- Hooper Township, Dodge County, Nebraska

== Other uses ==
- Hooper (film), 1978 comedy film starring Burt Reynolds
- Hooper (mascot), the mascot for the National Basketball Association team, Detroit Pistons
- Hooper (coachbuilder), a British coachbuilder fitting bodies to many Rolls-Royce and Daimler cars
- USS Hooper (DE-1026), a destroyer escort in the US Navy
- Hooper Ratings, an early audience measurement in early radio and television
- Hooper, someone who practices dance form of Hooping
- Hooper, an archaic English term for a person who aided a cooper in the building of barrels

== See also ==
- Hooper X, a character in Kevin Smith's 1997 film Chasing Amy
- Hoppity Hooper, American animated television series in the 1960s
- Hooper's Store, store on the children's TV show Sesame Street
- Cooper (surname)
- Justice Hooper (disambiguation)
- Whooper swan (pronounced 'hooper'), a species of swan
