= Justice Hooper =

Justice Hooper may refer to:

- Perry Hooper Sr. (1925–2016), chief justice of the Alabama Supreme Court
- Robert Lettis Hooper, chief justice of the New Jersey Supreme Court
