= Earlobe =

Part of the ear

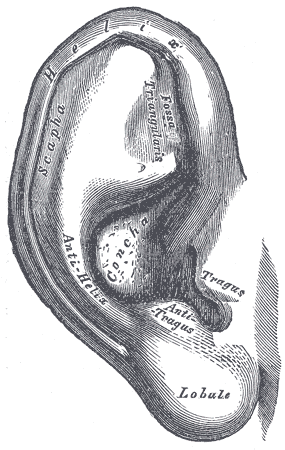

Details
- System: Auditory system

Identifiers
- Latin: lobulus auriculae (singular), lobuli auricularum (plural)
- TA98: A15.3.01.003
- TA2: 105
- FMA: 60984

The human earlobe (lobulus auriculae), the lower portion of the outer ear, is composed of tough areolar and adipose connective tissues, lacking the firmness and elasticity of the rest of the auricle (the external structure of the ear). In some cases the lower lobe is connected to the side of the face. Since the earlobe does not contain cartilage it has a large blood supply and may help to warm the ears. However, earlobes are not generally considered to have any major biological function. The earlobe contains many nerve endings, and for some people is an erogenous zone.

The zoologist Desmond Morris in his book The Naked Ape (1967) conjectured that the lobes developed as an additional erogenous zone to facilitate the extended sexuality necessary in the evolution of human monogamous pair bonding.

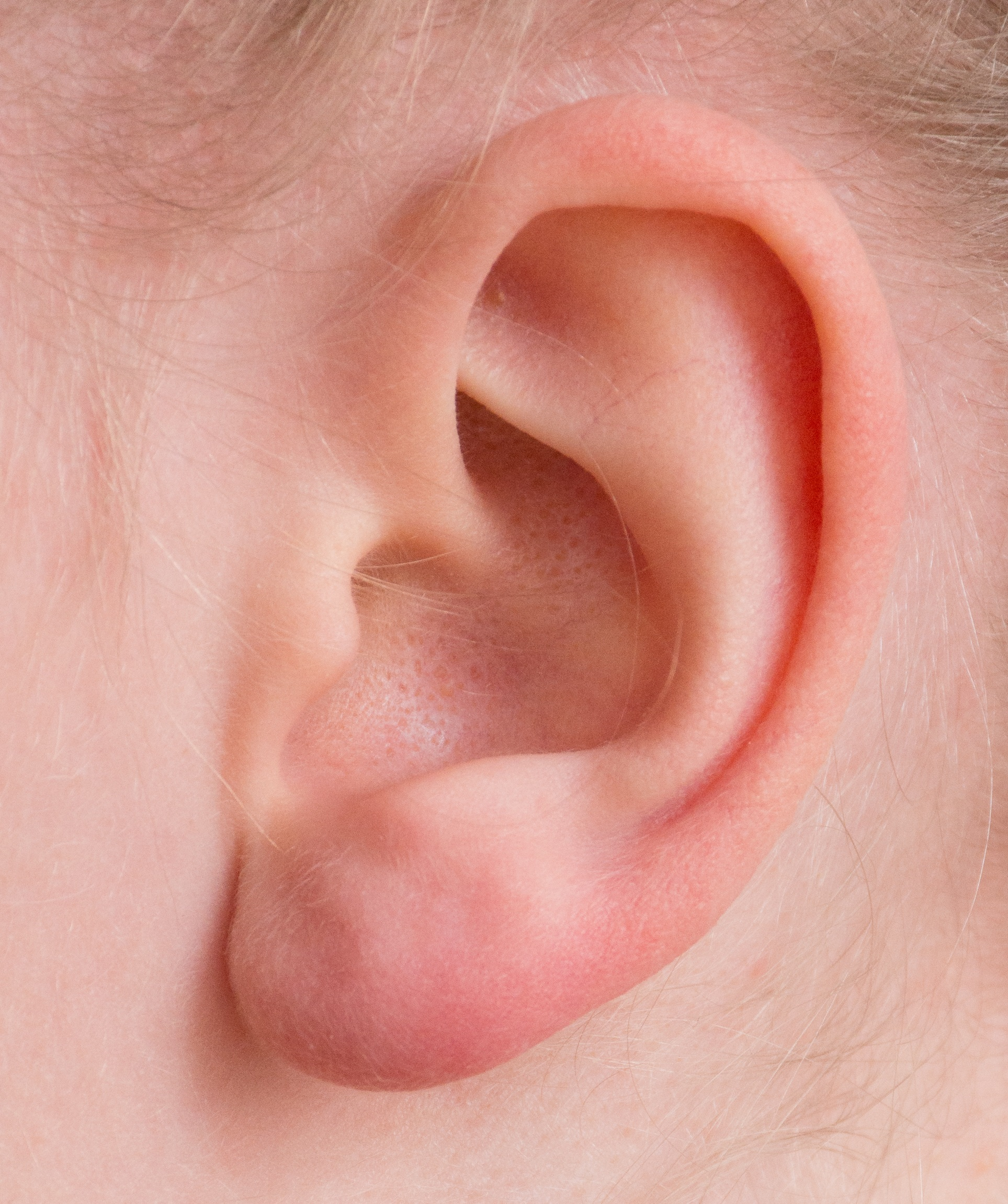
A free earlobe

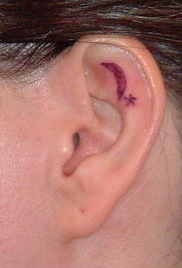
An attached earlobe

== Organogenesis ==
The earlobe, as a body part built of epithelium and connective tissue, might appear to be derived from dermatome. But this is not the case, as in the surrounding tissue there are no somites and thus no dermatome. In this area, the dermis is derived from cells of mesenchymal cells: the mesenchyme is derived from the sclerotome and splanchnopleura located in the nearby regions of the torso.

The earlobe as a body part arises and develops in the vicinity of auricular follicle, as a result of cascade induction:

1. The first-level inductor is the central segment of Archenteron's roof, which induces the production of the Medulla oblongata (part of the Hindbrain).
2. The second-level inductor is the Medulla oblongata, which induces the production of a pair of auricular follicles derived from the mesoderm.
3. The third-level inductor is the auricular follicle, which induces the production of the auditory bulla.

== Genetics ==
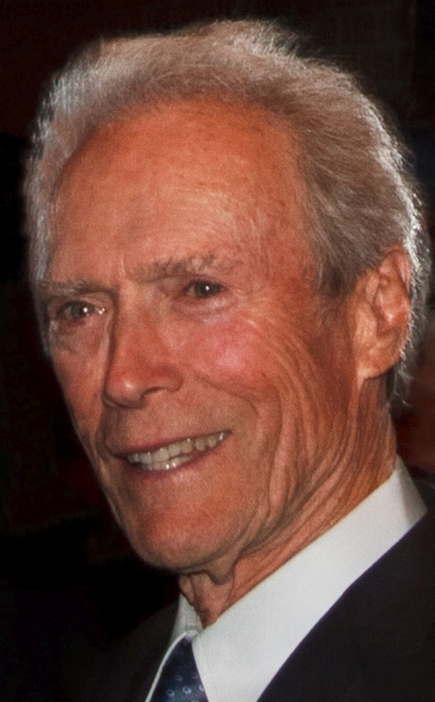
Clint Eastwood, who has an extreme form of attached earlobe.

Earlobes average about 2 centimeters long, and elongate slightly with age. Although the "free" vs. "attached" appearance of earlobes is often presented as an example of a simple "one gene – two alleles" Mendelian trait in humans, earlobes do not all fall neatly into either category; there is a continuous range from one extreme to the other, suggesting the influence of several genes.

Recessive gene frequency in the selected worldwide populations
Population	N	Recessive gene frequency (for attached ear lobes)	Source
Africans	?	0.60	Messeri (1976)
Afroamericans	242	0.56	Glass et al. (1952)
Ainu	?	0.49	Messeri (1967)
Babinga	?	0.87	Messeri (1967)
Bavaria	?	0.84	Messeri (1967)
Bosnia and Herzegovina	7,325	0.55	Hadžiselimović (1981)
Brazil	?	0.34	Saldanha (1960)
Cameroon	?	0.83	Messeri (1967)
Canadian Aboriginals	532	0.68	Chaison (1963)
China	?	0.62	Messeri (1967)
Hong Kong	70	0.80	Lai, Walsh (1966)
India: Bengal	100	0.49	Dutta (1963)
Japan	70	0.82	Lai, Walsh (1966)
Lapland	?	0.71	Messeri (1967)
Micronesia	?	0.52	Messeri (1967)
Nepal	169	0.66	Bhasin (1969)
New Guinea	399	0.80	Lai, Walsh (1966)
Nicobar Islands	813	0.81	Gabel (1958)
Papuans	?	0.54	Messeri (1967)
Polynesia	?	0.39	Messeri (1967)
Russia	?	0.59	Messeri (1967)
Sardinia	403	0.53	Messeri (1967)
Scotland	500	0.48	Chattopadhyay (1968)
Somalia	?	0.42	Messeri (1967)
Sweden	247	0.59	Wiener (1937)
Tibet	?	0.68	Tiwari, Bhasin (1969)
United States: Baltimore	380	0.63	Glass et al. (1952)
United States: Brooklyn	248	0.92	Wiener (1937)
United States: Buffalo	381	0.43	Dronamraju (1966)
United States: Pennsylvania	241	0.50	Glass et al. (1952)

== Clinical issues ==
Earlobes are normally smooth, but occasionally exhibit creases. Creased earlobes are sometimes associated with genetic disorders in children, including Beckwith-Wiedemann syndrome. In some early studies, earlobe creases were thought to be associated with an increased risk of heart attack and coronary heart disease. But more recent studies have concluded that, since earlobes become more creased with age, and older people are more likely to have heart disease than younger people, age rather than intrinsic factors may account for the findings linking heart attack to earlobe creases. The earlobe crease is also called Frank's Sign.

== Society and culture ==
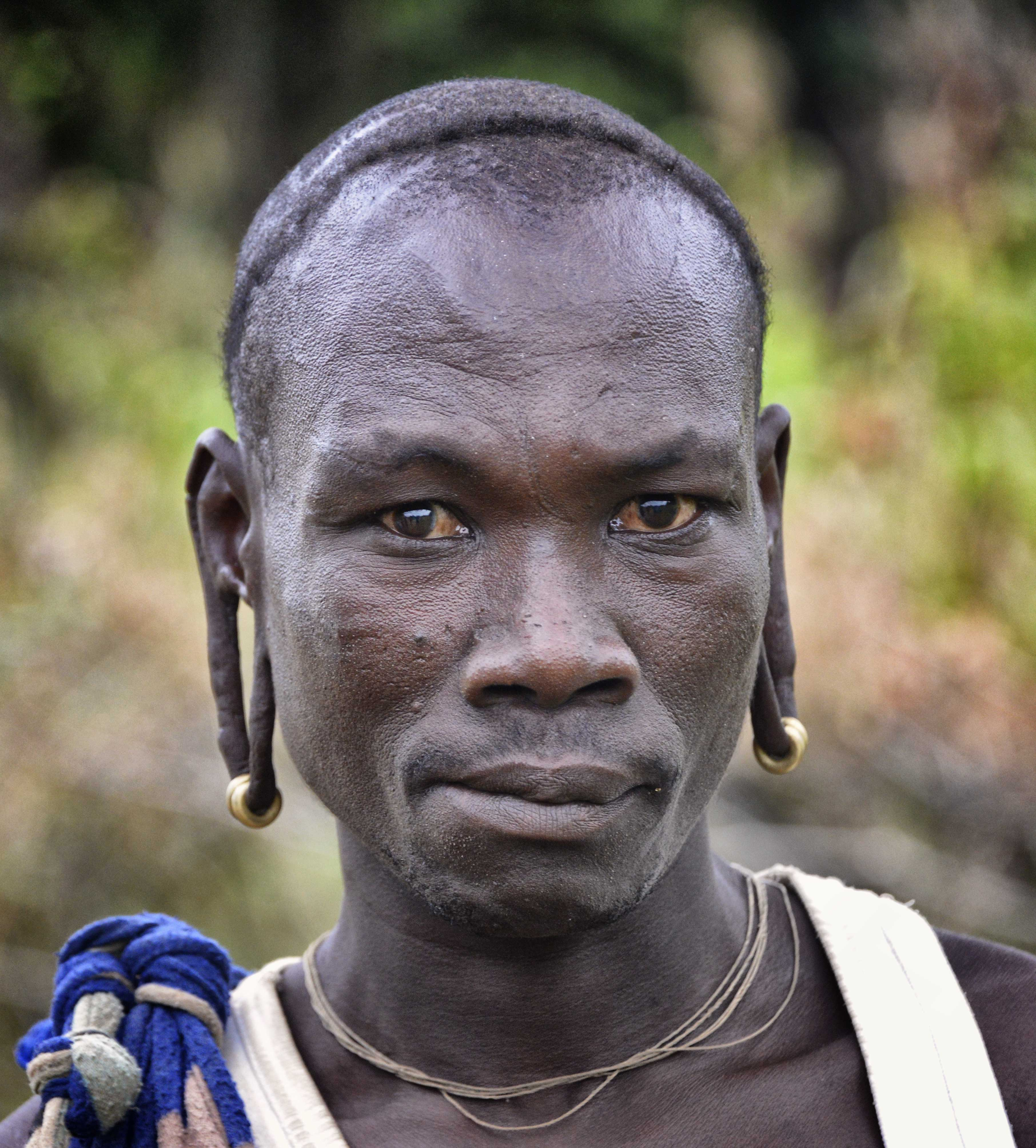
Stretched earlobe piercing, Ethiopia

=== Earlobe piercing and stretching ===
Piercing the earlobes is a commonplace activity in many cultures in many historical eras; no other location on the body is as commonly pierced. Consequently, injury to the earlobe due to the weight of heavy earrings is also common. Some cultures practice earlobe stretching for decorative effects, using piercing ornaments to stretch and enlarge the earlobes to accommodate plugs.

=== Negative effects of wearing earrings ===
Some research has found that the most frequent complications connected with wearing earrings are:

- inflammation,
- keloids,
- loss of tissue by tearing, and
- mechanical division of earlobes.

A noticeable relationship has been found by Polish scientists between the piercing of young girls' earlobes and their subsequently developing allergic skin reactions. In the view of Professor Ewa Czarnobilska, the manager of the research team, the primary reason for the allergies connected to earrings is the presence of nickel, which is a common component of the alloys used in jewelry production and leaches from the earrings. The symptom seen is generally eczema, and is often misdiagnosed as a food allergy, for instance to milk. The specific mechanism in allergies caused by earrings is the contact of nickel ions with the lymphatic system.

The study noted that children who stopped wearing earrings did not see the disappearance of the allergic symptoms. The immune system remembers the presence of the nickel ions in the person's blood and lymph, so the child can still react to:

- metal parts of wardrobe,
- dental braces,
- dental prosthesis,
- orthotics,
- meals cooked in pots with addition of nickel,
- margarine (nickel is a catalyst in hydrogenation of unsaturated fats),
- coins,
- chocolate,
- nuts,
- leguminous vegetables,
- wine, and
- beer.

Research by allergists has found that in a sample of 428 pupils of ages 7–8 and 16–17 years old:

- 30% of the research population showed an allergy to nickel, and
- the allergy occurred in girls who had started wearing earrings in early childhood.
