= Cartilage piercing =

Type of body piercing

A cartilage piercing can refer to any area of cartilage on the body with a perforation created for the purpose of wearing jewelry. The two most common areas with cartilage piercings are the ear and the nose. Outside of the body modification community, many people commonly refer to a helix piercing as a "cartilage piercing." The cartilage ear piercing is known to be more sore than the lobe as in the cartilage there is less blood, so it takes longer to heal (typically anywhere from 4-12 months).

== Ear cartilage piercings ==
- Helix piercing: The outer rim of cartilage on the ear, extending from just above the lobe to its apex and then curving down slightly to meet the head.
  - Forward helix piercing: The area of the helix closest to the head; generally any piercing between the apex of the helix and where the helix joins the head.
  - Industrial piercing: Two piercings joined by a single piece of jewelry, usually a barbell, commonly with one piercing in the helix and the other in the forward helix, though other multiple-piercing placements may still be termed industrials.
- Antihelix: The raised ridge of cartilage between the helix and ear canal.
  - Rook: The upper ridge of cartilage of the antihelix; between the tragus and apex of the helix. For most people, a rook piercing through a prominent ridge of cartilage will give the jewelry a vertical appearance as the piercing goes from top to bottom of the surface.
  - Snug: The lower ridge of cartilage of the antihelix. A snug piercing also has a unique appearance as the cartilage is pierced from one side to the other, rather than from front to back.
- Conch: Can refer to a piercing of either the inner or outer conch.
  - Inner conch: The cup-shaped portion of the ear directly in front of the ear canal, used for capturing sound.
  - Outer conch: The relatively flat area between the rim that forms the helix and the ridge that defines the antihelix.
- Daith piercing: The small flap of cartilage just above the ear canal. With a correctly placed daith, the entrance and exit holes will be unseen and the jewelry will appear to be coming out of the ear canal itself. It will rest in the inner conch.
- Tragus piercing: The small, thick flap of cartilage directly over the ear canal, connected to the head.
- Antitragus piercing: A small nub of cartilage just above the earlobe and across from the tragus.

== Nose cartilage piercings ==
- Nostril: A piercing passing through the nostril on either side and ending in the inside of the nose.
  - High nostril: A piercing placed further towards the top of the nose, much closer to the bone than a standard nostril piercing.
- Nose tip: A piercing that begins within either nostril and exits at the tip of the nose.
- Nasallang: A set of three piercings connected by one piece of jewelry, usually a barbell. Both nostrils are pierced, as well as the septum. Depending on anatomy, the piercer, and the preference of the client, the septum piercing may or may not go through cartilage.
- Septum: The piece of tissue in the middle of the nose separating the two nostrils. A septum piercing is often incorrectly regarded as a cartilage piercing. While some people do have septum piercings which pass through cartilage, most septum piercings pass through the small bit of tissue directly beneath the cartilage and above the skin.
