= Esho =

Esho is a surname. Notable people with the surname include:

- Mark Esho (born 1962), British entrepreneur
- Tijion Esho (born 1981), British doctor
