= Dejhoor =

Indian Kashmiri ornament

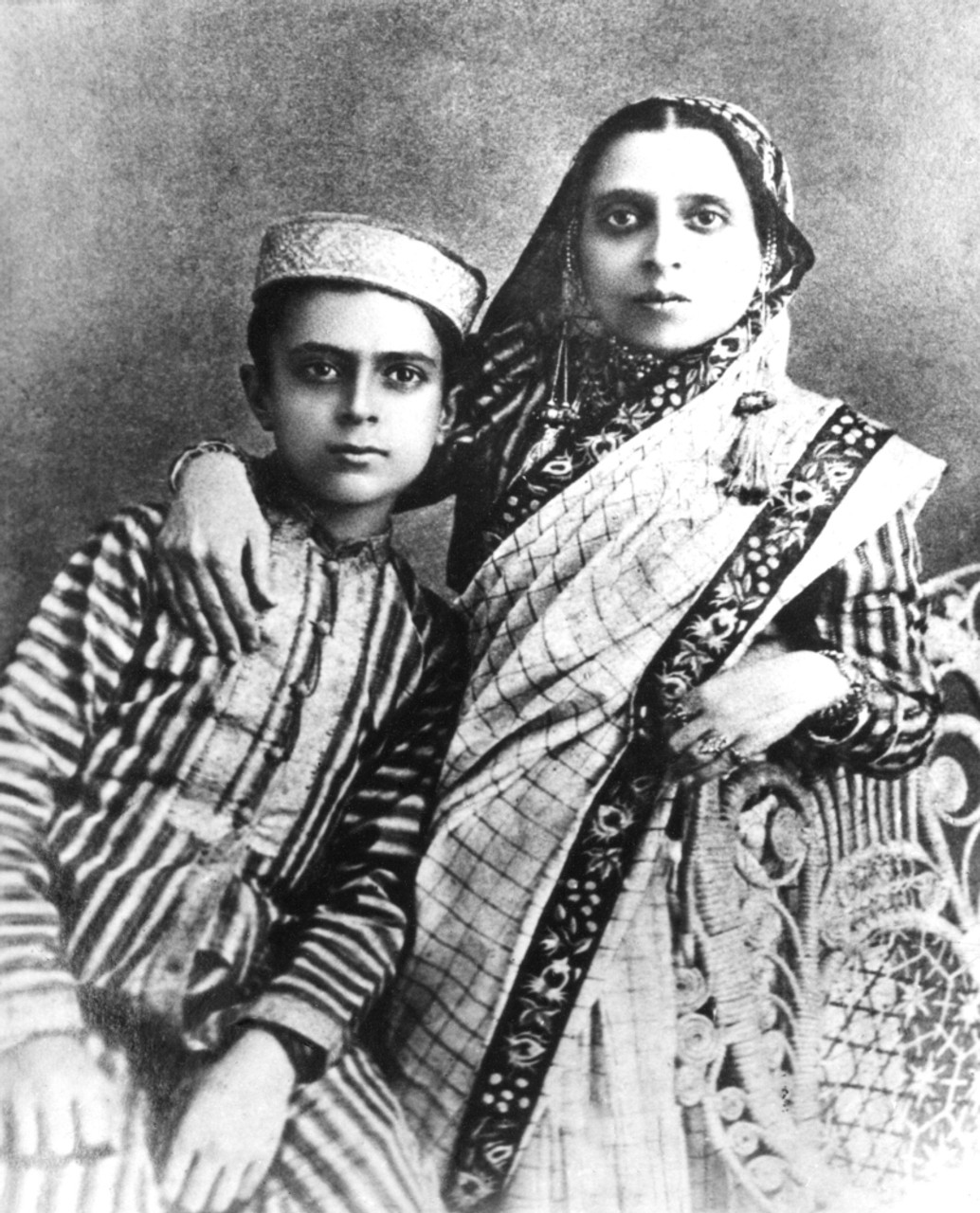
Jawaharlal Nehru as a young boy and his mother Swarup Rani wearing dejhoor

Dejhoor (or Deji-Hor) is a dangling ear ornament worn by Kashmiri Pandit women native to the Kashmir Valley of Jammu and Kashmir, India, from the eve of their wedding onwards.

The jewelry is placed in the cartilage piercing of the ear in a red thread and later the thread may be replaced with a gold chain known as an ath bought by her in-laws at their house. The thread or chain is about 8-12 inches. The bottom part athur, which will be of gold, gold /silver threads or pearls, is attached to the dejhoor. The ornament is not worn by Kashmiri Muslims or those from any other Hindu community.

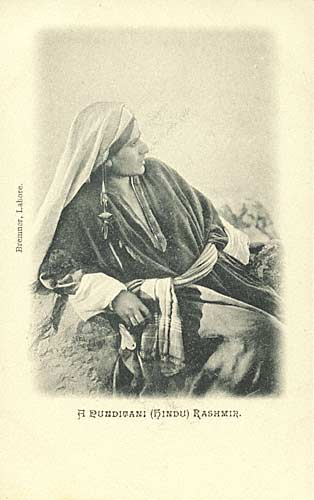
Kashmiri Pandit lady in 1900

It symbolises union between two Kashmiri Pandit families. The dejhoor ornament is always hexagonal and it symbolizes a yantra denoting Shiva and Shakti.

An interpretation of the term Dij is that it represents "dvija" and is thus the female counterpart of a yajnopavita in the Brahmin community.

Its function is similar to that of a mangal-sutra or sindoor in other regions of India. However a dejhoor is provided by the bride's family and worn even after the death of her husband.

== See also ==
- Culture of Kashmir
