= Claire's =

American tween fashion jewelry retailer

Claire's Stores, Inc.
- Formerly: Fashion Tress Industries (1961–1973); Claire's Accessories (1973–1997)
- Industry: Retail
- Founded: 1961 (as Fashion Tress Industries)
- Founder: Rowland Schaefer
- Fate: Acquired by Ames Watson Capital
- Headquarters: Hoffman Estates, Illinois, U.S.
- Number of locations: 900 in North America (2025)
- Area served: United States; Puerto Rico; Canada; France; Italy; Spain; Portugal; Germany; Saudi Arabia; Qatar; United Arab Emirates; Austria; Guatemala; Honduras; United Kingdom; Ireland (formerly); South Africa (formerly); Japan (formerly)
- Products: Accessories, jewelry, and cosmetics
- Revenue: ▼US$1.403 billion (2015)
- Operating income: ▼US$14.6 million (2015)
- Net income: ▼US$236.4 million (2015)
- Owner: Ames Watson Capital
- Number of employees: 18,100 (2015)
- Website: www.claires.com

Claire's (formerly known as Claire's Boutiques, Claire's Boutique and Claire's Accessories) is an American retailer of accessories, jewelry, and toys primarily aimed towards tween and teen girls, and young women. It was founded in 1961 and is based in Hoffman Estates, Illinois, a suburb of Chicago. The company is primarily owned by Elliott Management and Monarch Alternative Capital, but, in 2022, announced plans to go public with an initial public offering.

As of October 2012, Claire's had 3,469 stores in 37 countries. Claire's claims it has done more ear piercings than any other retailer, totaling at over 100 million in 25+ years.

Proceedings in the US Bankruptcy Court started in 2025, and Claire's Accessories UK went into administration in August 2025.

== History ==
In 1961, Rowland Schaefer founded Fashion Tress Industries, a company that sold wigs and became the world's largest retailer for fashion wigs. In 1973, Fashion Tress acquired Claire's, a 25-store jewelry chain, and began shifting its focus towards a line of fashion jewelry and accessories under the new name, Claire's Accessories, Inc. Claire's Accessories began providing ear piercing services in 1978 and, in 1980, established a Hong Kong-based sourcing office. During the 1980s, Claire's Accessories opened new stores throughout the United States and bought Topkapi, a Japanese chain of 16 stores, in 1989. Claire's Accessories continued acquiring companies in the 1990s, including Bow Bangles — a British chain with 71 stores in England, Wales, and Scotland — in 1995; two American chains, The Icing (85 stores) and Accessory Place (31 stores), in 1996; and Bijoux One, a Swiss chain, in 1998. The Icing would become the company's primary brand for women in their 20s. In 1999, Claire's purchased Cleopatre, a chain in Paris with 42 stores, for $11 million cash, as well the American chain, Afterthoughts. Afterthoughts stores were converted to Icing stores after they were purchased. In 1997, the business changed its name to Claire's. In 2001, claires.com was launched. In 2002, the company purchased the US-based clothing chain Mr. Rags.

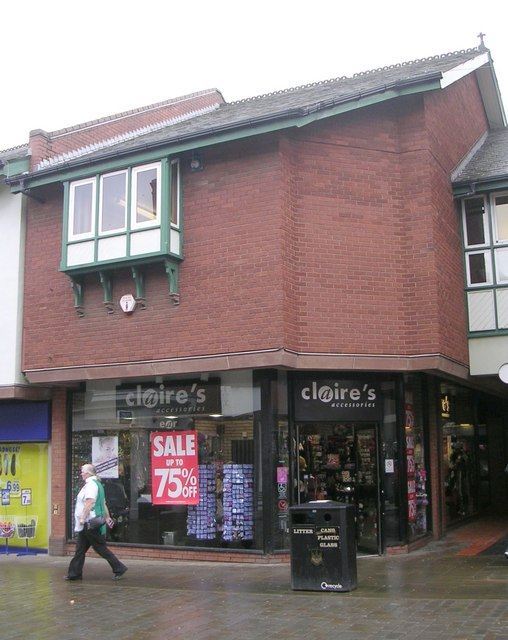
An older style shop front in Pontefract, West Yorkshire.

Claire's was a publicly-traded company listed on the NASDAQ, but was taken private by the private equity firm Apollo Global Management in a $3.1 billion leveraged buyout in 2007. In 2008, Claire's consolidated its European operations into one group with headquarters in Birmingham. The first stores in Ukraine were opened in 2010. In 2011, e-commerce operations were launched in the United States, alongside the opening of stores in India and Mexico. In 2012, Claire's expanded its international presence by opening its first stores in China, Italy, Indonesia, Luxembourg, Dominican Republic, Panama, and Honduras.

In 2018, Claire's filed for Chapter 11 bankruptcy in the U.S., with plans to shed a majority of its debt. The company planned to shutter nearly 100 underperforming locations as it tried to eliminate debt with the help of Elliott Investment Management and Monarch Alternative Capital. By 2022, Claire's had exited bankruptcy, announced preliminary sales growth for fiscal year 2021 of 53% on revenue of $1.4 billion, and announced plans for an initial public offering. The company's new strategy involves shuttering stores in underperforming locations in favor of "prestige" malls, as well as setting up kiosk shops within drug and grocery store chains.

On July 9, 2025, Claire's warned that it would be considering Chapter 11 bankruptcy protection for its U.S. operations for the second time in 7 years. The company blamed declining consumer demand, rising import costs caused by President Donald Trump's U.S. tariffs and heavy debt as a result of the decision. Houlihan Lokey, an investment banking services company, is negotiating with Claire's to improve financing and explore the sale of some or all of its assets, including international operations. While Claire's had interested buyers for its European operations, they have refused to identify names as the information is "confidential". On July 24, 2025, Claire's put its French operations in receivership by the Paris Commercial Court.

By August 4, 2025, it was reported that Claire's had failed to pay rent at many of its locations throughout June and July. The company also warned that a Chapter 11 bankruptcy filing could happen as soon as the end of the week. On August 5, 2025, Claire's filed for Chapter 11 bankruptcy for the second time in seven years, listing assets and liabilities between $1 billion to $10 billion, while also filing creditor protection under the Companies' Creditors Arrangement Act in Canada. Claire's announced the closure of 18 stores, mostly located in dead malls, with stores to close by September 7. That same day, as part of a deal with a liquidation firm, Claire's announced the closure of all of its 1,326 US locations across both its namesake and Icing brands, unless a buyer was found for both brands. Liquidation sales were expected to start within a few weeks and stores were expected to close by October 31.

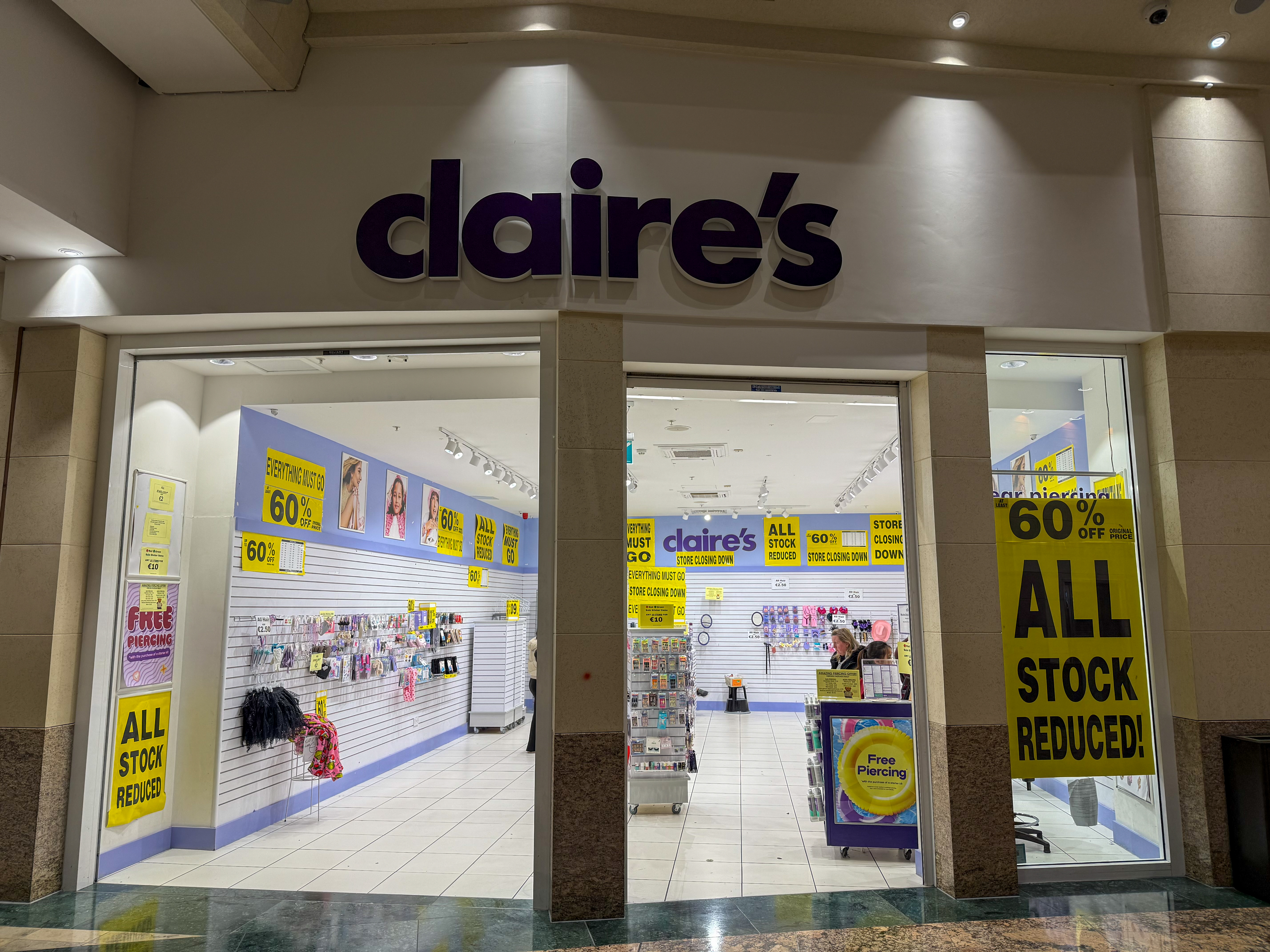
A Claire's store in Dublin, Ireland with the store closing down discount sign, March 2026

On August 6, 2025, Claire's announced the definite closure of 700 locations nationwide, including all of its namesake stores located in Walmart stores, as well as the discontinuation of the Icing brand. Without a buyer, the company was to move toward liquidating its entire North American footprint of roughly 1,500 stores. On 13 August 2025, Claire's went into administration in the United Kingdom and Ireland and filed for bankruptcy in Belgium. Its German, Italian and Austrian divisions were also expected to file for bankruptcy and wind down operations, putting over 2,150 jobs at risk across 306 stores. On August 20, the company announced it would sell the North American business and IP to private equity firm Ames Watson Capital. As part of the deal, 235 Claire's and 56 Icing stores, for a total of 291 locations, were to close by September 7, 2025. The company deemed the stores as underperforming to keep operating. Both Modella Capital - who purchased the high street retail and online businesses of WHSmith for £40m in June 2025 - and Doug Putman - whose company Sunrise Records took over operations of HMV in 2019 - made offers to purchase Claire's UK and Irish operations. Modella bought the UK and Irish operations on 29 September 2025.

On September 19, 2025, it was announced that investment firm Ames Watson Capital had completed the purchase of the Claire's North American business and the IP for $140 million, with the intention of keeping some of the retailer's stores open. Ames Watson acquired the retailer’s North American business out of bankruptcy and grew its retail portfolio, which includes controlling investments in Lids, South Moon Under, and Ebbets.

In January 2026, the UK side of Claire's, owned by Modella Capital, went into administration again, with staff at risk of redundancy. All standalone outlets closed on 27 April 2026, though a number of concessions will continue to operate.

In May 2026, French entrepreneur Julien Jarjoura bought the UK naming rights for Claire's, some executives, 50 stores and some concessions, the remaining stores would remain closed and the Claire's UK corporate identity, its Irish business and remaining stock from concessions would not be part of the deal, Claire's UK stores and website would operate under Claire's Europe, owned by Jarjoura. Shortly after, Jorjoura announced plans to bring Claire's back to the high street, claiming that he has already begun signing leases and plans to open between four and ten new stores every week from June 2026.

== Offices ==
As of 2014 Claire's had 6 offices:

- Hoffman Estates, Illinois (a suburb of Chicago): Global HQ, North America HQ, North America Distribution Center
- Birmingham: Europe HQ, Europe Distribution Center
- Hong Kong: Sourcing & Buying, International Distribution Center
- Pembroke Pines, Florida (a suburb of Miami): Accounting
- Paris: Field Support
- Madrid: Field Support

=== Illinois office ===
Claire's has its Illinois offices in Hoffman Estates, Illinois, a suburb of Chicago. The facility is a brown brick building off of Interstate 90, near Barrington Road. The building serves as Claire's distribution center and main facility, and all merchandise is routed through this facility. Its products, which, as of 1996, are mainly imported, are distributed and marketed through the Hoffman Estates location. The company's buying, distribution, and marketing divisions are in the Hoffman Estates facility. As of 1996, 236 full-time employees and several temporary employees worked in the facility. Leslie Mann of the Chicago Tribune said that the facility "contrasts with Claire's glittery stores in the United States, Canada, Puerto Rico, the United Kingdom and Japan." Mann added, "Except for the prototype store in the lobby and the fashion accessories that line the walls of the buyers' offices, the center is unremarkable."

A facility in Wood Dale, Illinois, used to serve the purposes now held by the Hoffman Estates office. In early January 1995, Pfizer sold its Hoffman Estates headquarters building for $7.4 million to Claire's so it could consolidate its operations in Memphis, Tennessee. At the time, the Hoffman Estates office had 247,000 square feet (22,900 m^{2}) of space. In 1998, Claire's announced plans to build a two-story office building and a 275,000-square-foot (25,500 m^{2}) warehouse at the Hoffman Estates site. This would double the total amount of space at the Illinois site.

=== Florida office ===
Its Florida office in Pembroke Pines, Florida, in Greater Miami. The Florida offices are west of the intersection of Flamingo Road and Pines Boulevard. It has 26,000 square feet (2,400 m^{2}) of space in its Florida offices. The current CEO for Claire's is Ryan Vero As of 1997 the CEO has his office in Pembroke Pines. In addition, the company's customer service and investor relations divisions are located in the Pembroke Pines offices. In November 1990 Claire's moved its Florida offices from northern Dade County to Pembroke Pines. The former headquarters in Dade County had 10,000 square feet (930 m^{2}) of space.

== Store types ==
Claire's stores average about 1,000 square feet, are typically located in malls and shopping centers, and carry the widest selection of merchandise among Claire's brands. Merchandise is targeted at different age groups ranging from children to young adults. Customers can find earrings, necklaces, bracelets, purses, hair accessories, fashion accessories, stuffed animals, makeup, and licensed merchandise. Stores are merchandised to accommodate different ages, and fashion trends are manipulated to appeal to all ages. Toys "R" Us also included a Claire's section for preteen and teenage girls.

In North America, Claire's also operates under the Icing brand, targeted toward older teens and young women aged 19–28. The merchandise is more expensive and has a more sophisticated look. Most items include accessories and jewelry, but merchandise also includes items such as candles, mineral-based cosmetics, birthday accessories, bachelorette and wedding accessories, and footwear. Icing typically does not offer licensed merchandise.

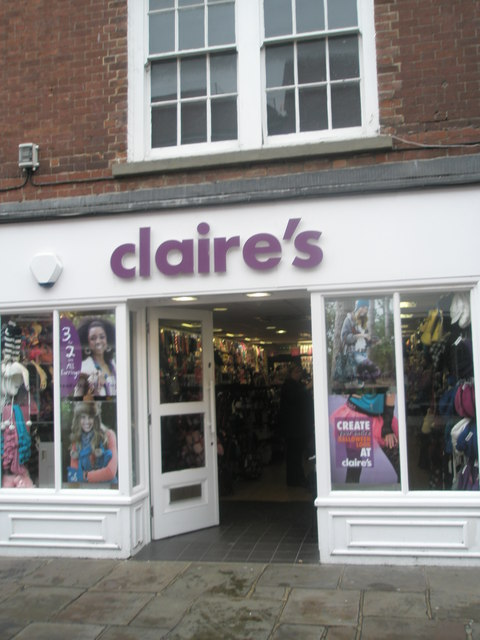
Claire's branch in North Street, Chichester (England)

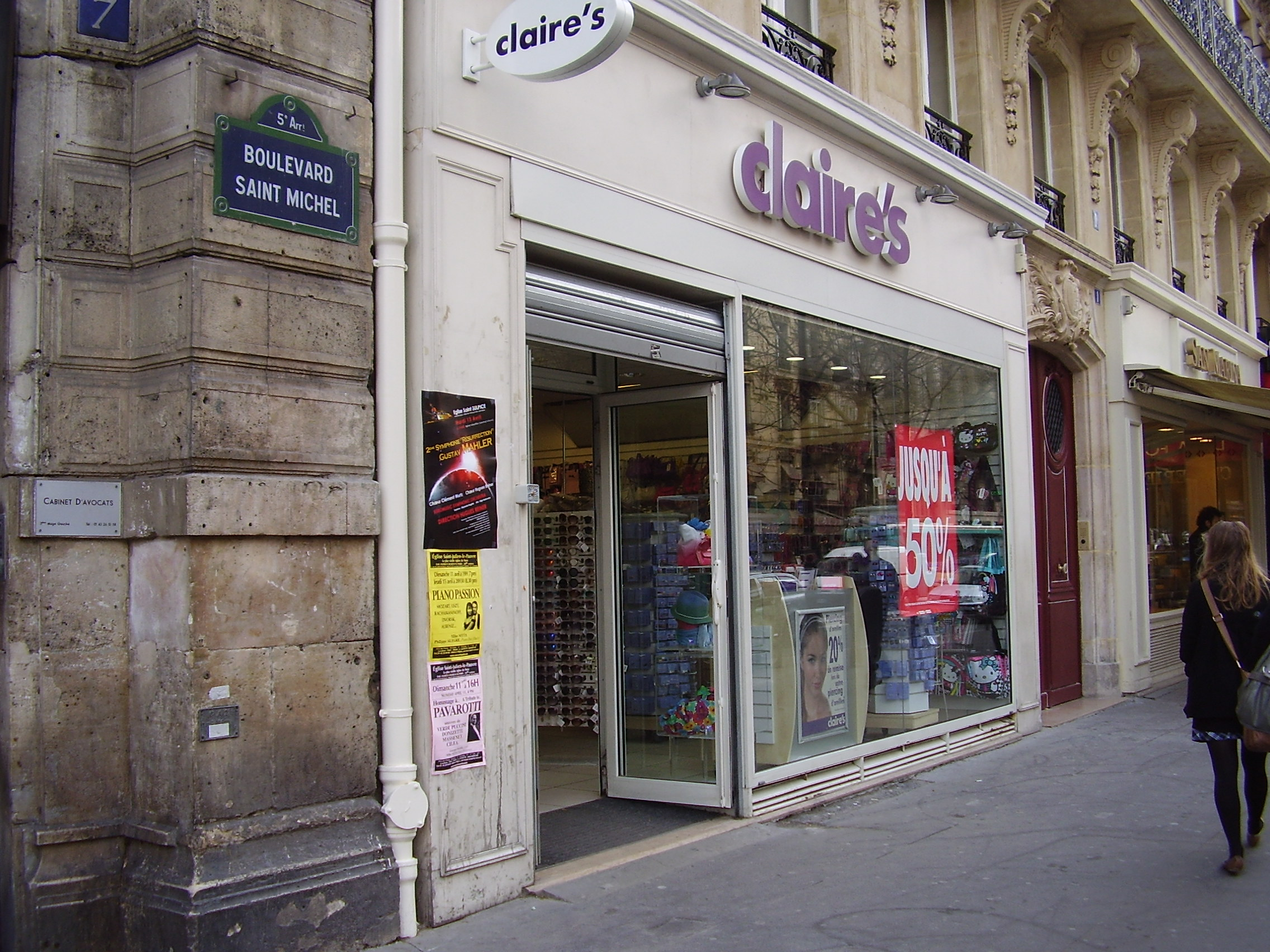
Claire's branch in Boulevard Saint-Michel, Paris (France)

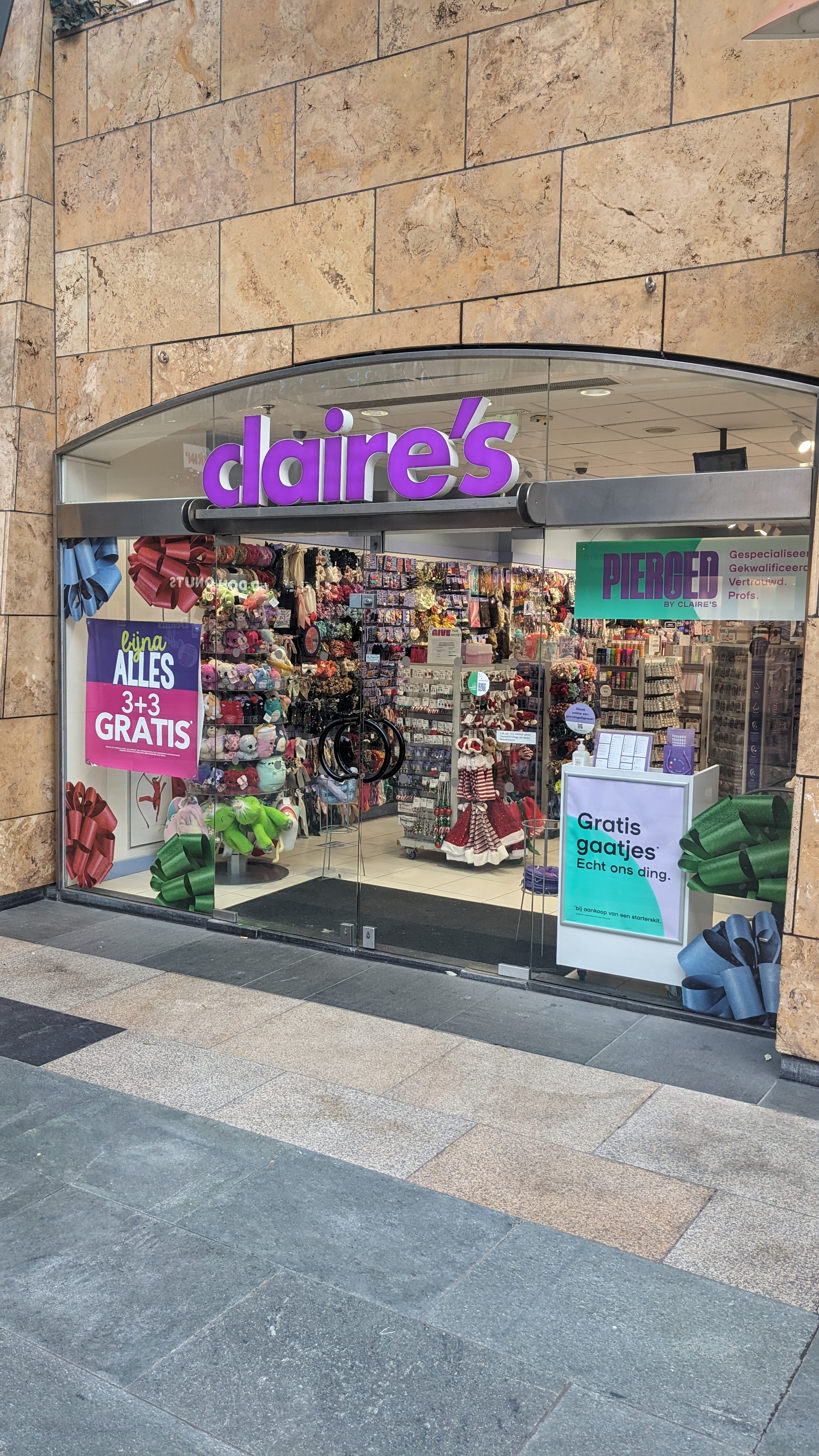
Claire's in Rotterdam (Netherlands)

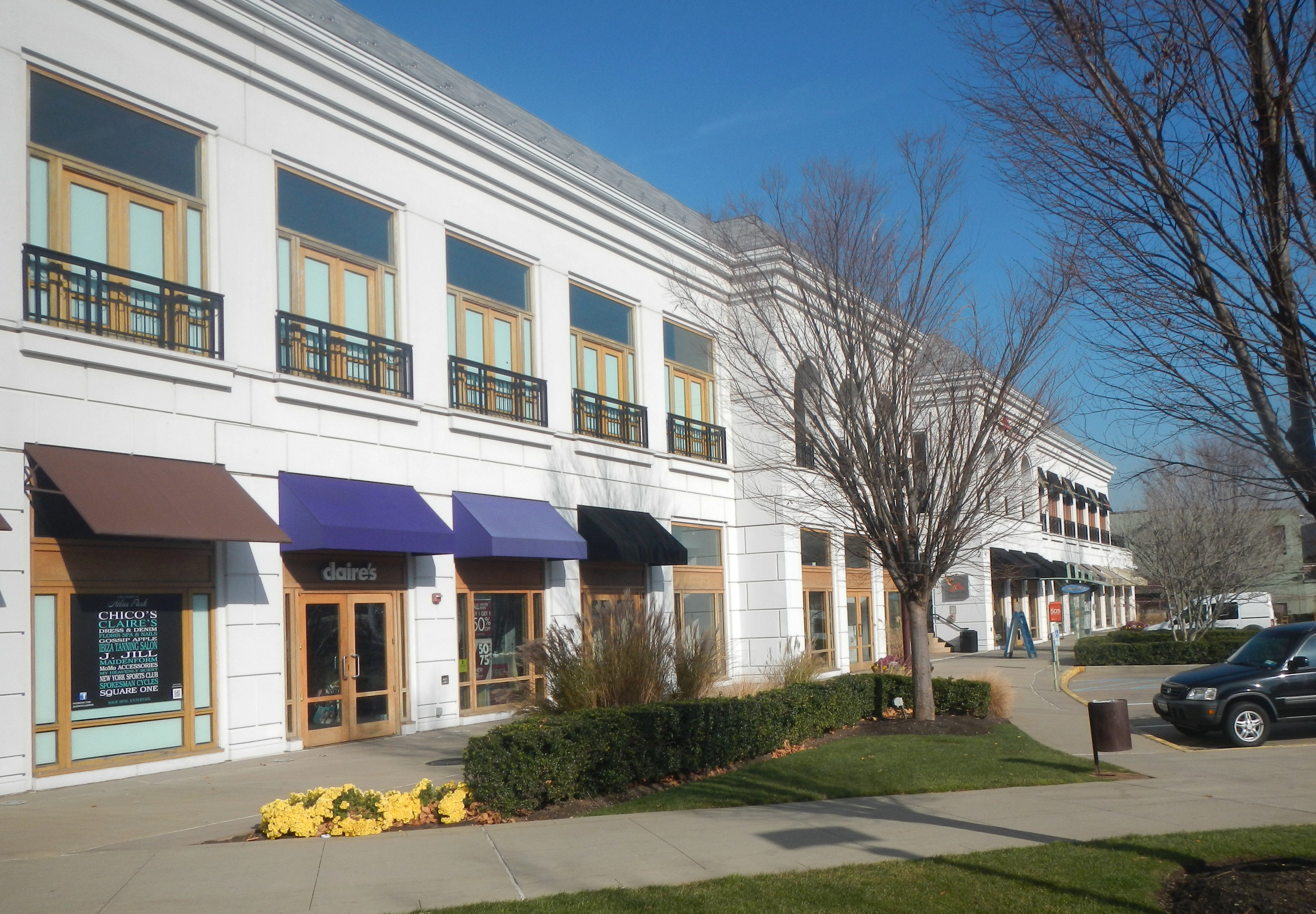
Glendale, Queens, New York

== Merchandise ==
Claire's sells fashion accessories that are geared towards children, tweens, teens, and young adults. Costume jewelry, imitation gemstone and pearl jewelry, licensed merchandise, body jewelry, hair accessories, make-up, stuffed animals and clothing items are available for purchase; Claire's also carries its own range of perfumes.

The store's merchandise is often divided into sections. Claire's Club is a line of jewelry and accessories aimed at children under seven years old, featuring designs inspired by princesses, fairies, unicorns and mermaids, among other motifs. The rest of the store is aimed at tweens, teens and young adults.

Claire's also carries an assortment of seasonal holiday items, such as for Valentine's Day, St. Patrick's Day, Easter, 4th of July, Halloween, and Christmas.

Some locations offer ear piercing, as all staff are fully trained in using a Studex piercing gun to conduct both ear and cartilage piercings. Claire's starts piercing customers at the age of four months with their immunizations and does not pierce the cartilage of people under 14 years of age.

== Asbestos recalls ==
Claire's have been subject to numerous cases of alleged "asbestos presence" in its products. These traces have been found in products containing talcum powder, a naturally occurring silicate substance. Talcum powder has been known to contain traces of asbestos, a recognized human carcinogen. On March 5, 2019, Claire's stated that the Food and Drug Administration (FDA) believed some of the company's products may have been contaminated with asbestos. Claire's stated that the FDA had "mis-characterized fibers in the products as asbestos, in direct contradiction to established EPA and USP criterion for classifying asbestos fibers".

On March 11, 2019, the FDA tested more Claire's products, indicating "the possible presence of asbestos". The affected products were sold between October 2016 to March 2019. In response to the FDA claim, Claire's stated they continue to have confidence in the safety of their products, however also issued a voluntary recall and advised consumers to discontinue use. On May 30, 2019, a JoJo Siwa cosmetic kit was voluntarily recalled due to the FDA warning consumers of "the possible presence of asbestos". The powder eyeshadow element of the kit was affected due to the possible presence of "trace amounts of asbestos fibers". Claire's stated these trace amounts were acceptable by European and Canadian cosmetic regulations, and they had ended the use of talcum powder in its products.

The company still "continues to have confidence in the safety and composition of its products" and "is not aware of any adverse reactions, injuries or illness caused by the possible presence of asbestos in the recalled products". Siwa posted a video informing her audience that Claire's would accept refunds of products new and used, stating she puts her "trust into other people's hands" with her products and was working to recall items from all shelves.
