= Antitragus piercing =

Type of ear piercing

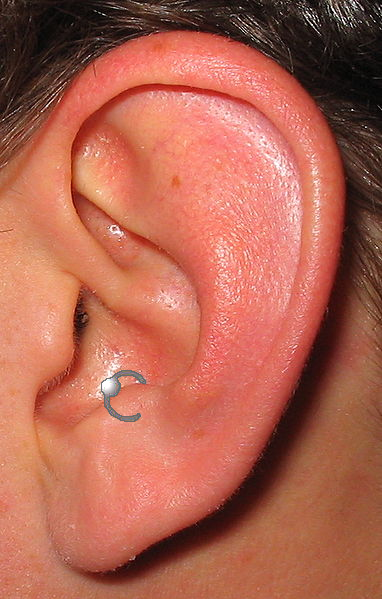
- Location: Antitragus
- Jewelry: barbell, captive bead ring
- Healing: 6 to 12 months

An antitragus piercing is a perforation of the outer ear cartilage for the purpose of inserting and wearing a piece of jewelry. It is placed in the antitragus, a piece of cartilage opposite the ear canal. Overall, the piercing has characteristics similar to the tragus piercing; the piercings are performed and cared for in much the same way.

== Healing ==
This piercing, like most cartilage piercings, can take anywhere from 6 to 12 months to fully heal.
