= Modern primitive =

Alternative subculture based on body modification

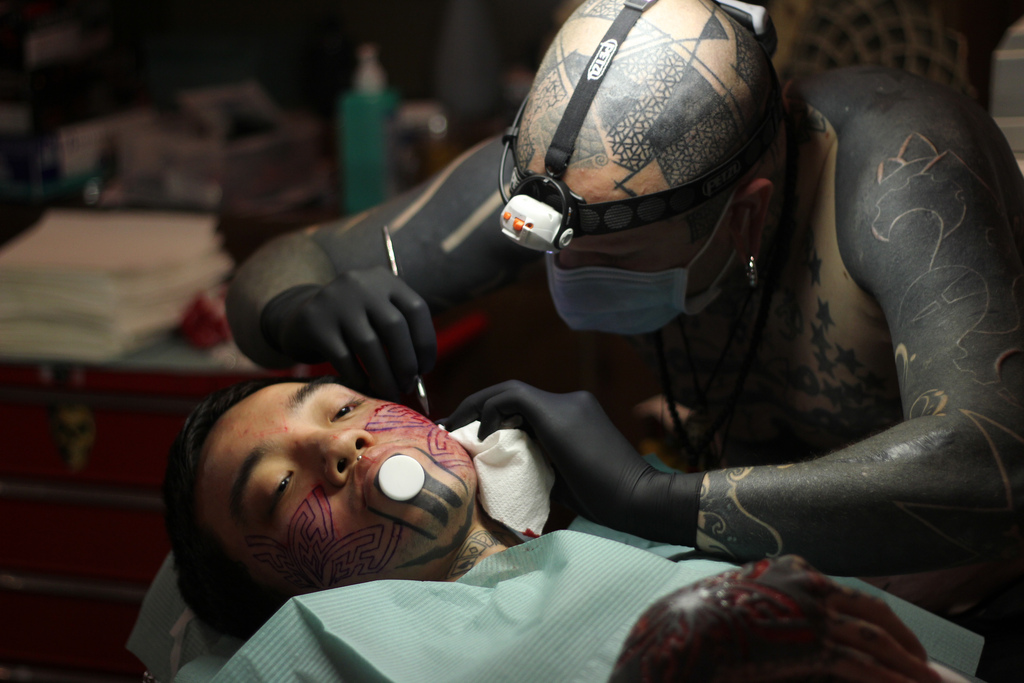
Scarification is one form of modern Western body modification, allegedly derived from what adherents consider "traditional", non-Western cultures.

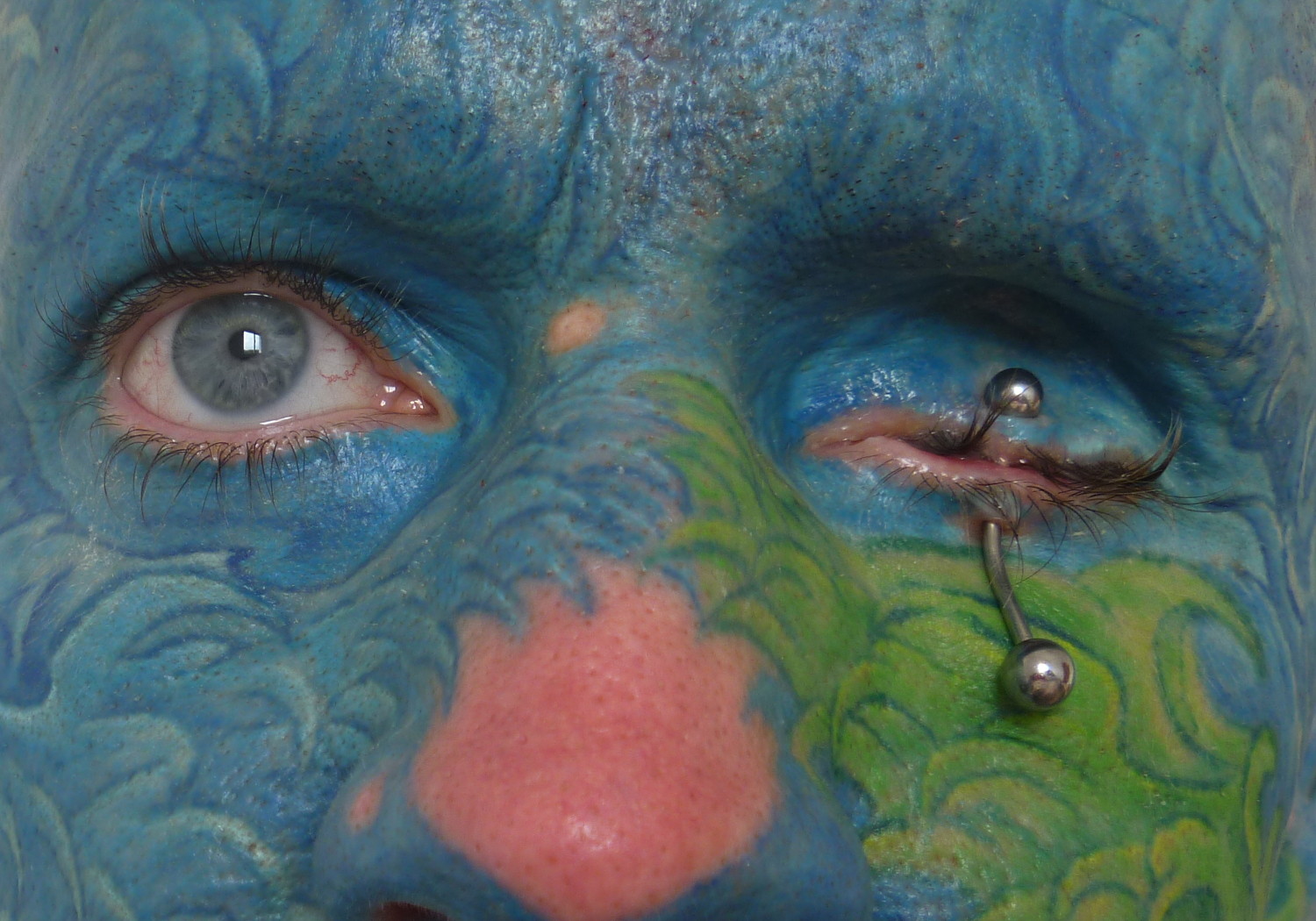
Facial piercings and facial tattoos are popular among those who see themselves as outsiders to mainstream Western society.

Modern primitives or urban primitives are adherents of an alternative subculture in developed, Western countries who engage in body modification rituals and practices inspired by the ceremonies, rites of passage, or bodily ornamentation in what they consider "traditional", non-Western cultures. These practices may include body piercing, tattooing, play piercing, flesh hook suspension, corset training, scarification, branding, penile subincision, and cutting.

== Origins ==
Roland Loomis, also known by his chosen name Fakir Musafar, was one of the founders of the modern primitive movement. The 1989 RE/Search book Modern Primitives is considered one of the first studies on the concept of modern primitivism.

Modern primitives identify with a connection between what they see as "the primitive" and authenticity; "in opposition to the corruptions of mainstream society".

Modern primitives may have a loose set of beliefs about their way of life, including

- Modification of the body in order to sculpt their self-image.
- Activities which reject society at large. Exploring the self is a personal statement, which society rejects.
- Resisting what they see as colonialism, and identification with anti-colonial struggles.

== Criticisms ==
Urban primitivism has been suggested as cultural appropriation and misrepresenting or "bundling" cultures together in a "primitive" setting. These have been debated, with adherents believing that these criticisms are based largely on the views of Roland Loomis rather than the culture as a whole.

== See also ==
- Noble savage
- Paleolithic diet
