= Industrial piercing =

Type of double hole body piercing

Industrial piercing, scaffold piercing
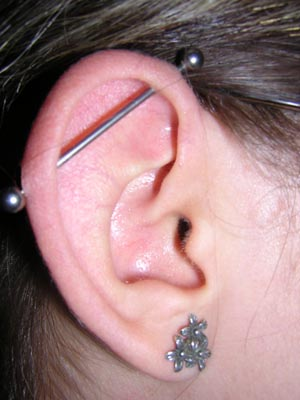
- Location: Ear cartilage
- Jewelry: Straight barbell

An industrial piercing (North America), also known as a scaffold piercing (UK/Ireland) or construction piercing, is any ear piercing that consists of two pierced holes connected with a single piece of jewelry. These piercings typically consist of a double perforation of the upper ear cartilage specifically. Two piercings must be made: one is fairly close to the head (known as a forward-helix piercing), while the second one is further down the helix on the opposite side of the ear. The most common industrial piercings are horizontal, but there are also vertical ones.

== History ==
Industrial piercings first appeared in the early 1990s when they were first invented by Erik Dakota along with the Daith piercing and Rook piercing. The first reference to the industrial piercing was in a 1992 edition of Body Play magazine, which referred to this piercing as the “industrial ear project."

Since its introduction, the industrial piercing has become fairly popular among people of all backgrounds, since the various styles of industrial jewelry available allow these piercings to be customized to the wearer's preferences. Celebrities with industrial piercings include Kylie Jenner, Ashley Tisdale, and Miley Cyrus.

== Procedure ==
Industrial piercings should always be done by a licensed professional with proper anatomical, procedural, and technical knowledge in a sterilized area.

Industrial piercings require two piercings to be made with a piercing needle since the piercings must be precisely aligned to be properly connected with a single piece of jewelry, like the barbell jewelry. Piercing guns should never be used for an industrial piercing because they are designed for lobe piercings, not cartilage ones. Additionally, piercing needles are single-use only and sterile, thus decreasing risk for infection.

The barbell jewelry worn with industrials is usually 14g (1.6mm). One of the piercings, the forward-helix piercing, is made closer to the head, while the second piercing, the outer-helix piercing, is made on the opposite side of the ear. While barbell jewelry is typically worn during the healing period to maintain piercing alignment, a pair of two shorter barbell's may be used as an alternative. Using two shorter barbell's may result in faster recovery times at the risk of the piercings becoming misaligned. A solution is an faux- industrial; two barbell's connected with a chain, to create a 'industrial look' without having one long barbell.
