= Martina Big =

German media personality (born 1988)

- Malaika Kubwa
- Born: 1988 (age 37–38); Rhineland-Palatinate, West Germany
- Occupation: Photo model
- Years active: 2012–present
- Modeling information
- Height: 5 ft 7 in (1.70 m)
- Hair color: Black (formerly blonde)
- Eye color: Brown
- Website: martina-big.com

Malaika Kubwa (born 1988), known professionally as Martina Big, is a German television personality known for her extremely large breast implants and for undergoing a perma-tanning procedure to give herself a dark skin color, eyebrow color and eye color. Big identifies as Black.

== Career and personal life ==
Big was born in Rhineland-Palatinate, West Germany. After receiving a high school diploma, she began a career as a flight attendant alongside her longtime partner Michael, who was a pilot. She quit working as a flight attendant in 2012 to pursue modeling and acting full-time. In 2017, Big confirmed in the Swedish television show Outsiders that she has the biggest breasts in Europe, employing a water displacement test.

On September 21, 2018, Big married her long-time partner Michael on a palm-lined beach on the Big Island of Hawaii.

== Body modifications ==
On 3 December 2012, Big underwent a breast augmentation with large expandable implants. Since then, she had 23 procedures to add volume to her breasts, reaching a bra size of 32 S.

In January 2017, Big began undergoing perma-tanning procedures to give her the appearance of a black woman. In February 2018, she traveled to Kenya and lived there with the tribes of the Maasai and Samburu. She was "baptised as a real African woman" by a local clergyman and was given the baptismal name Malaika Kubwa; in Swahili, "malaika" means "angel" and "kubwa" means "big".

In May 2019, she had her previous breast implants replaced by new, bigger, expandable models, which are the biggest breast implants in the world, each with a rated volume of 20,000 cubic centimetres (1,200 cu in).

== Filmography ==
Year	Title	Role	Director	Genre
2017	Codename: Diablo!	Barbie Blonde	Aaron Barsky	Action comedy

== Television ==
Date of broadcast	TV station	Country	Title
2015-03-01	RTL (German TV channel)	Germany	Explosiv Weekend
2015-07-01	RTL (German TV channel)	Germany	Punkt 12
2015-11-12	RTL (German TV channel)	Germany	Explosiv – Das Magazin
2016-02-10	Channel 4	United Kingdom	Bodyshockers
2016-08-27	RTL (German TV channel)	Germany	Explosiv Weekend
2016-09-08	Kanal 5 (Sweden)	Sweden	Outsiders
2016-12-22	RTL (German TV channel)	Germany	Explosiv – Das Magazin
2017-02-11	RTL (German TV channel)	Germany	Explosiv – Das Magazin
2017-04-08	RTL (German TV channel)	Germany	Explosiv – Das Magazin
2017-04-13	ITV (TV channel)	United Kingdom	This Morning
2017-05-16	RTL (German TV channel)	Germany	Explosiv – Das Magazin
2017-06-12	Antena One	Romania	Acces Direct
2017-06-13	Antena One	Romania	Acces Direct
2017-06-18	E!	United States	Botched
2017-07-01	RTL (German TV channel)	Germany	Explosiv Weekend
2017-07-04	ProSieben	Germany	Taff
2017-07-04	Puls 4	Austria	Fortlaut
2017-07-21	RTL (German TV channel)	Germany	Punkt 12
2017-07-26	Sat.1	Germany	Sat 1 Frühstücksfernsehen
2017-08-02	Sat.1	Germany	Sat 1 Frühstücksfernsehen
2017-08-08	Sat.1	Germany	Sat 1 Frühstücksfernsehen
2017-09-05	Kanal 5 (Sweden)	Sweden	Outsiders
2017-09-06	NPO 3	Netherlands	De Braboneger Basht!
2017-09-20	NBCUniversal	United States	Maury
2017-09-23	RTL (German TV channel)	Germany	Explosiv Weekend
2017-09-23	RTL (German TV channel)	Germany	Das Supertalent
2017-09-25	RTL (German TV channel)	Germany	Punkt 12
2017-09-25	RTL II	Germany	Detlef Soost Show
2017-09-25	NBCUniversal	United States	Maury
2017-09-27	RTL (German TV channel)	Germany	Die 25 unfassbarsten Geschichten der Welt
2017-09-27	Sat.1	Germany	Sat 1 Frühstücksfernsehen
2017-10-04	ITV (TV channel)	United Kingdom	This Morning
2017-12-01	Channel One Russia	Russia	Andrey Malakhov Let Them Talk
2017-12-08	ProSieben	Germany	Big Stories – Die extremsten Bodys
2017-12-14	ProSieben	Germany	red.2017 Der große Jahresrückblick
2017-12-15	Sat.1	Germany	Sat 1 Frühstücksfernsehen
2017-12-27	ProSieben	Germany	Taff
2018-01-05	RTL (German TV channel)	Germany	Explosiv – Das Magazin
2018-03-20	RTL (German TV channel)	Germany	Guten Morgen Deutschland
2018-03-20	RTL (German TV channel)	Germany	Punkt 12
2018-03-20	RTL (German TV channel)	Germany	Explosiv – Das Magazin
2018-03-24	RTL (German TV channel)	Germany	Best of...!
2018-03-24	RTL (German TV channel)	Germany	Explosiv Weekend
2018-03-26	Sat.1	Germany	Sat 1 Frühstücksfernsehen
2018-03-28	Sat.1	Germany	Sat 1 Frühstücksfernsehen
2018-04-03	Sat.1	Germany	Sat 1 Frühstücksfernsehen
2018-04-06	Sat.1	Germany	Sat 1 Frühstücksfernsehen
2018-04-06	RTL (German TV channel)	Germany	Explosiv – Das Magazin
2018-04-06	RTL (German TV channel)	Germany	Guten Morgen Deutschland
2018-07-05	Sat.1 Gold	Germany	Lebenslust – Das SAT.1 Gold Magazin
2018-07-17	E!	United States	Botched
2018-07-17	Nippon TV	Japan	Sekai Gyoten News
2018-08-03	RTL (German TV channel)	Germany	Guten Morgen Deutschland
2018-08-03	RTL (German TV channel)	Germany	Punkt 12
2018-08-09	ProSieben	Germany	Big Stories – Die krassesten Körper
2018-08-15	Sat.1	Germany	Die Unglaublichsten Vorher-Nachher-Sensationen
2018-09-28	RTL (German TV channel)	Germany	Explosiv – Das Magazin
2018-09-30	RTL (German TV channel)	Germany	Explosiv Weekend
2018-10-01	RTL (German TV channel)	Germany	Punkt 12
2018-10-02	RTL (German TV channel)	Germany	Guten Morgen Deutschland
2018-10-02	RTL (German TV channel)	Germany	Punkt 12
2018-10-04	RTL (German TV channel)	Germany	Guten Morgen Deutschland
2018-10-04	RTL (German TV channel)	Germany	Punkt 12
2018-10-05	RTL (German TV channel)	Germany	Guten Morgen Deutschland
2018-10-05	RTL (German TV channel)	Germany	Punkt 12
2018-10-07	RTL (German TV channel)	Germany	Explosiv Weekend
2018-10-08	RTL (German TV channel)	Germany	Guten Morgen Deutschland
2018-12-21	RTL (German TV channel)	Germany	Guten Morgen Deutschland
2018-12-21	RTL (German TV channel)	Germany	Punkt 12
2018-12-23	RTL (German TV channel)	Germany	Explosiv Weekend
2018-12-30	RTL (German TV channel)	Germany	Explosiv Weekend
2019-01-21	ITV (TV channel)	United Kingdom	This Morning
2019-01-22	Sat.1	Germany	Sat 1 Frühstücksfernsehen
2019-01-23	RTL (German TV channel)	Germany	Explosiv – Das Magazin
2019-01-27	RTL (German TV channel)	Germany	Explosiv Weekend
2019-02-07	Sat.1	Germany	Sat 1 Frühstücksfernsehen
2019-02-07	Sat.1	Germany	Endlich Feierabend
2019-03-12	Sat.1	Germany	Sat 1 Frühstücksfernsehen
2019-03-29	RTL (German TV channel)	Germany	Explosiv – Das Magazin
2019-03-30	VOX (German TV channel)	Germany	Brutal schön – Mein optimierter Körper
2019-04-06	RTL (German TV channel)	Germany	Best Of...
2019-06-11	RTL (German TV channel)	Germany	Explosiv – Das Magazin
2019-06-16	RTL (German TV channel)	Germany	Explosiv Weekend
2019-07-03	ITV (TV channel)	United Kingdom	This Morning
2019-07-06	RTL (German TV channel)	Germany	Best Of...
2019-08-09	RTL (German TV channel)	Germany	Explosiv – Das Magazin
2019-08-11	RTL (German TV channel)	Germany	Explosiv Weekend
2019-08-28	Sat.1	Germany	Die Unglaublichsten ... Hingucker
2019-09-01	RTL (German TV channel)	Germany	Explosiv Weekend
2019-10-08	RTL (German TV channel)	Germany	Explosiv – Das Magazin
2019-11-01	VOX (German TV channel)	Germany	Prominent!
2019-12-15	ProSieben	Germany	Big Stories – Die extremsten Bodys
2019-12-29	RTL (German TV channel)	Germany	Explosiv Weekend
2020-01-22	Channel 5 (British TV channel)	United Kingdom	Bodylicious!
2023-01-09	Sat.1	Germany	Britt – Der Talk: Mein Körper ist ein Kunstwerk
2023-09-25	RTL (German TV channel)	Germany	Explosiv – Das Magazin
