= Rook (piercing) =

Type of body piercing

Rook piercing
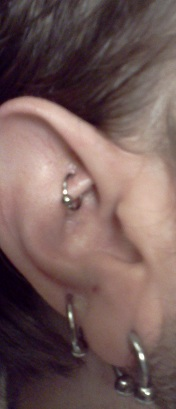
- Location: Antihelix
- Jewelry: Curved Barbell, CBR
- Healing: 6 months for primary, 12 to 18 for full healing

A rook piercing is a perforation of the antihelix of the ear for the purpose of wearing jewelry. It is located just above the tragus on the ridge between the inner and outer conch with the piercing passing from the underside to the top of this ridge, differing from many ear piercings that essentially span between a "front" and "back" surface. Erik Dakota, a well known professional piercer and the individual responsible for originating and popularizing the rook piercing, is said to have named this modification after a shortened version of his first name. The piercing was first named in issue #4 of the magazine Body Play and Modern Primitives Quarterly (published by Fakir Musafar) around 1992 alongside the first printed reference to the industrial piercing, then termed "industrial ear project".

== Procedure ==
The procedure is done similarly to other piercings of the cartilage of the ear. Clamps may be used but it is usually done freehand. Once the area is cleaned, the piercer and the client will agree on placement, although because of its location it can be difficult to see exactly where the entrance and exit holes will be. Generally, the piercer will advise the client on the best location. The entrance and exit holes are marked, and a hollow needle is pushed through. Many professional piercers will use either a 14g or 16g needle by default. The jewelry is then inserted, and the piercing complete.

Pain is very subjective and it is difficult to ascertain how much the initial piercing will hurt to a given person. Some people experience pain comparable to that of an average cartilage piercing to the helix or tragus, and others have described it as one of the most painful piercings they've ever received, either in the ear or their whole body. However, pain thresholds differ between individuals, so what may be painful to one person may be a slight tickle to someone else.

== Healing and aftercare ==
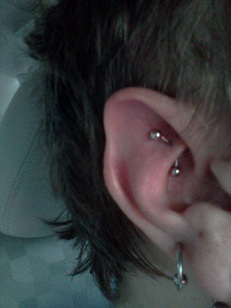
Fresh rook piercing (top) with 16g Curved Barbell

The rook piercing is also cared for much like any other ear cartilage piercing. Use an sterile saline for the aftercare. Spray one or two times a day and leave it for a minute, couple minutes. Wipe the crusties off with a non-woven gauze or paper towel. One must be careful not to over-wash the area as this can lead to drying the area out. Alcohol and peroxide should also not be used for the same reason. Antibacterial and antimicrobial ointments (such as Neosporin) should never be used as they seal off the wound from receiving any air. One should avoid touching the area as much as possible, and if necessary, wash their hands beforehand. Care should be taken when changing shirts so that the jewellery isn't tugged as well as when using a telephone as the receiver may spread germs to the wound and the pressure can delay healing. Otherwise, for most people, the area is tucked into the ear more so than most other cartilage piercings and is less susceptible to incidental bumps and knocks.

Soreness is likely to persist for the first couple of months with the worst occurring during the first week or two. Jewellery should not be changed until at least eight weeks after the procedure. Primary healing will usually conclude within six months with full, secondary healing of the fistula complete in 12 to 18 months. Much of the cartilage in the ear receives comparatively little blood flow accounting for the increased healing time and persistent soreness.

== Jewelry ==
Any type of body modification jewelry can be worn in the piercing with the most common being CBRs (captive bead ring) and curved barbells. Many piercers recommend that a curved barbell is worn initially. The curved barbell has less curvature than a CBR, thus reducing strain on the healing fistula and leading to a healthier piercing and shorter healing times. People often choose relatively small diameter rings and shorter barbells owing to the confined space of the piercing. Oftentimes individuals will need assistance in removing and especially inserting jewelry due to the small area and difficulty in seeing and reaching the piercing coupled with the complexity of screwing on small parts without stripping the jewelry and/or securing the ball in a CBR.

== Complications ==
Generally, the rook piercing presents the same set of complications and risks as other cartilage piercings in the ear, although its concealed nature makes it less prone to accidental snags than other piercings. However, not everyone has suitable anatomy for a viable, long-term rook piercing. Someone with a poorly defined ridge in this area is encouraged not to have this procedure done. An experienced piercer will be able to accurately assess whether or not the client's ear is suited for a rook piercing and will likely refuse to perform the modification on someone with an inadequate ridge.

Some individuals have complained about persistent soreness in the area spanning a year or more, migration, and in some cases even rejection. While some of these issues can arise from improper aftercare and careless handling, many times they are the result of improper placement or poorly suited anatomy. Depending on the size and thickness of one's antihelix in this area, the increased curvature of a CBR (as opposed to a curved barbell) can put undue strain on the healing fistula which can prolong soreness and promote migration. Rejection will only occur in the most extreme of circumstances, usually because of poor placement (too shallow or oddly angled hole) or extreme trauma inflicted on the piercing especially during healing. In general, a person with decent health and proper hygiene is unlikely to experience any complications or pain outside of the normal healing process.

It is also important to refrain from attempting to stretch this area, at least without talking to an experienced piercer beforehand and following their advice. Cartilage normally will not stretch significantly although smaller gauge stretchings may be possible for some people.
