= Katie Piper =

English television presenter and writer (born 1983)

Katie Piper OBE
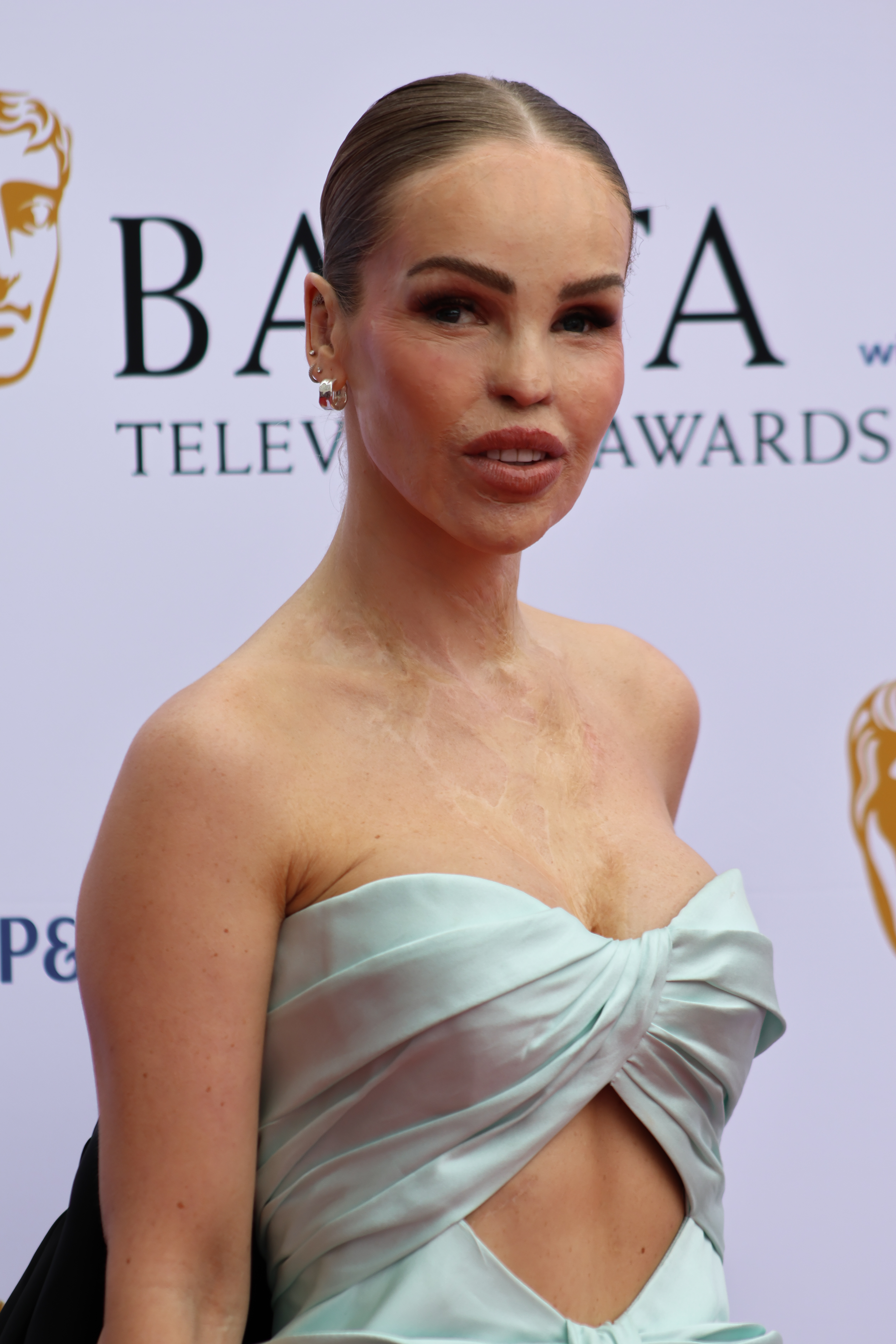
- Piper at the 2026 British Academy Television Awards in London, England
- Born: Kate Elizabeth Piper; 12 October 1983 (age 43); Andover, Hampshire, England
- Occupations: Activist; writer; television presenter
- Spouse: Richard Sutton (m. 2015)
- Children: 2

Kate Elizabeth Sutton (née Piper; born 12 October 1983) is an English writer, activist, television presenter and model from Andover, Hampshire.

In March 2008, her stalker, Daniel Lynch, raped her and stabbed her several times in the arms. Two days later, Lynch and accomplice Stefan Sylvestre attacked her with acid, causing major damage to her face and blindness in one eye. Piper underwent pioneering surgery to restore her face and vision. Both attackers were convicted and given life sentences. In 2018, Sylvestre was released after serving nine years in prison.

In 2009, Piper gave up her right to anonymity in order to increase awareness about burn victims. Her experience was documented in the 2009 Channel 4 documentary Katie: My Beautiful Face part of the Cutting Edge series. It has subsequently been sold internationally.

Piper later appeared in multiple follow-up series for Channel 4, released a best-selling autobiography, and had a regular column in weekly magazines. She also presents the Channel 4 television series Bodyshockers about members of the public about to undergo body-altering procedures and those who regret procedures they have had. Her main work has been for the Katie Piper Foundation, which she founded to help victims of burns and other disfigurement injuries. On 13 August 2018, she was announced as the first contestant for that year's Strictly Come Dancing. In September 2020, she joined the BBC One programme Songs of Praise as a presenter. In July 2021, she became a panellist on Loose Women.

== Early life and education ==
Piper was born as Kate Elizabeth Piper on 12 October 1983 in Andover, Hampshire, to David and Diane Piper and attended Harrow Way School and Portway Junior School as a child. She has an elder brother, Paul, and a younger sister, Suzy.

After leaving school, Piper trained as a beautician, aiming to build on her fondness for fashion and beauty.

== Early career ==
Piper subsequently began a career in modelling, taking part in various fashion, glamour and promotional photoshoots, including modelling for national newspapers. She also began work as a promotional model: appearing and carrying out publicity duties at live events, such as working as a ring-card girl at martial arts fixtures.

Piper also conducted a career as a digital television presenter, working principally on web-TV shows and features, and on small digital television channels, primarily in the shopping and live-chat fields. As her career began to develop, Piper moved away from her family home in Hampshire, and began to live with friends in a flat in Golders Green, North London.

== Assault and acid attack ==
Daniel Lynch, a martial arts enthusiast who had been tracking Piper's media and modelling career, met her through Facebook. The two first met in person in Reading, Berkshire, where Piper had been working. Two weeks after meeting, the couple booked into a hotel in Bayswater, following a meal out. In the hotel room, Lynch raped and beat Piper, threatened to cut her with a razor and hang her, and stabbed her several times in the arms. After eight hours at the hotel, they drove back to Piper's Golders Green flat. Piper was treated for her wounds at Royal Free Hospital, but withheld the nature of the incident from the doctors and police, because she was afraid of Lynch.

Piper received numerous phone calls and apologies from Lynch. On 31 March 2008, two days after the initial attack, Lynch persuaded Piper to go to an internet cafe to read an email he had sent to her Facebook account. Luring Piper to this location was a ruse, as he had given her details to Stefan Sylvestre, who identified her on Golders Green Road. Wearing a hoodie to obscure his identity, Sylvestre approached Piper, who thought he was going to ask for money, and then threw sulphuric acid at her face. Piper later said: "When the acid was thrown at me, it felt like I was burning in hell. It was an indescribable, unique, torturous pain."

The acid attack was caught on CCTV and Lynch and Sylvestre were arrested. Lynch received two life sentences, with a minimum of 16 years to be served. He had a previous conviction for pouring boiling water over a man. Sylvestre received a life sentence, and was told he would serve a minimum of 6 years. Sylvestre's parole application for release was approved in 2018. In 2022, it was reported Sylvestre had breached the terms of his parole on numerous occasions, and had allegedly fled the UK that August.

=== Treatment and recovery ===
Immediately after the attack, Piper ran into a local café, where an ambulance was called. Piper was treated in Chelsea and Westminster Hospital, where her treatment was led by plastic surgeon Mohammad Ali Jawad. The acid, some of which Piper had swallowed, blinded her in her left eye, and caused partial thickness and full thickness burns. The surgeons completely removed the skin off Piper's face, and replaced it with a skin substitute, Matriderm, to build the foundations for a skin graft. This procedure was the first of its kind to be done in a single operation.

Piper was put into an induced coma for 12 days. She has been through numerous surgical operations to treat her injuries, and wore a plastic face mask for 23 hours a day, which flattened the scars and helped retain moisture. As part of her care from the National Health Service, Piper was treated at a clinic in Southern France. The treatment she received there was designed to break down scar tissue and prevent skin contraction. Subsequent to the attack, Piper moved out of her London flat and returned to Hampshire to live with her parents and younger sister Suzy.

== Personal life ==
Near the end of 2009, she established a charity, the Katie Piper Foundation, aimed at raising awareness of the plight of victims of burns and other disfigurement injuries; the charity also campaigns for the specialist treatment Piper received, such as the after-care scheme undertaken in France, to be more widely available to patients in Britain.

Following her recovery and the establishment of the Katie Piper Foundation, Piper again moved out of the family home and returned to living alone in London, a process documented in episodes of Katie: My Beautiful Face; she later moved to live with her partner Richard Sutton, a carpenter. On 14 March 2014, she gave birth to their first child. In December 2014, she announced her engagement to Sutton. They married on 6 November 2015. On 13 December 2017, she gave birth to their second child. Piper turned to Christianity after the attack.

== Television and radio ==
Although Piper had the right to remain anonymous because of the sexual assault, she chose to waive her anonymity, in an attempt to increase public awareness of the situation for burn victims, and also the treatment they go through. Piper also took part in a documentary about her experience, Katie: My Beautiful Face, which was aired by Channel 4 on 29 October 2009, and, according to figures from Attentional, gained over 3.3 million viewers. The programme has been rebroadcast several times and in a number of territories.

In 2009, Piper read the Alternative Christmas Message on Channel 4. The message was about Piper's own experiences, family and not judging people by their appearance. Piper also featured in one of the two Alternative Christmas Messages in 2011 with the theme "Just Be Yourself".

In 2010, the ABC (US)'s news-magazine television series 20/20 featured Piper as its primary subject. The programme consisted of an interview conducted by Elizabeth Vargas, and footage of Piper at home, including material which had appeared in Katie: My Beautiful Face.

Piper worked again with Mentorn Media, producer of Katie: My Beautiful Face, in a series titled Katie: My Beautiful Friends. In this, she met people who were disfigured, disabled or physically altered as a result of illness, injury, assault, accident or surgery. The films also chronicled the development and growth of the Katie Piper Foundation and began its four-part run on 22 March 2011. Items of supporting information and relevant associated content relating to the programme were placed on the Channel 4 website in tandem with the programme's broadcast. The series was broadcast in the US on the OWN channel from 16 August 2011.

In 2012, Channel 4 broadcast a new one-off film featuring Piper as she prepared to undergo stem-cell surgery in a bid to restore sight in her damaged left eye. Katie: The Science of Seeing Again saw Piper look into the biology of the eye, visit the US to look into the religious and moral debate around the use of embryos in stem-cell research, and monitored her as she underwent the treatment. Within the programme Piper revealed she had undergone 109 medical operations in the four years since the acid attack, with the eye operation being her 110th.

Bodyshockers (2014) is a four part series on Channel 4, looking at look at cosmetic and surgical procedures, and giving advice to those looking to restore a more natural look having previously undergone treatments they now regret. The second and third series were broadcast on Channel 4.

The Australian series 60 Minutes featured Piper in 2009. In the same month, she appeared on Channel 4's Krishnan Guru-Murthy-hosted television-led debate The TV Show to discuss the reaction to the original documentary. Piper has also appeared as a guest on a number of British magazine and news programmes including Live From Studio Five, Woman's Hour, BBC Breakfast and This Morning.

In 2012, Piper participated in a week-long series for Channel 4 Hotel GB. In 2013, Piper took part in The Secret Millions, a Secret Millionaire spin-off. In 2013, Piper appeared in the three-part Gok Live: Stripping for Summer. Piper also appeared as a box-opener in Gok Wan's edition of Celebrity Deal or No Deal in 2013.

In 2018, Piper became a brand ambassador for Swarovski.

In 2018, Piper appeared as a contestant on the sixteenth series of Strictly Come Dancing. She was partnered with professional dancer Gorka Márquez and they were the third couple to be eliminated.

Piper became a feature presenter on Songs of Praise in September 2020. In July 2021, she became a panellist on Loose Women.

Piper presents Channel 4's Never Seen a Doctor (2016).

== Writing ==
Piper's autobiography, called Beautiful, was published in paperback by Ebury Press on 17 February 2011. Following the success of Beautiful, Piper signed a three-book deal with publisher Quercus. The first of these was a self-help book titled Things Get Better: If you believe then you will survive, followed by a page-a-day compilation of positive affirmations, quotes and mantras, Start Your Day with Katie, both of which were published in 2012. A second volume of memoirs, titled Beautiful Ever After, was released in 2014. Piper released her next book Confidence: the Secret in late 2016. In 2018, Piper and her mother published the book From Mother to Daughter: The Things I'd Tell My Child through Quercus.

Piper has written for Reveal magazine and Now magazine. She has also written for newspapers including the Sunday Mirror and the Sunday People.

== Honours, awards and nominations ==
Katie: My Beautiful Face was nominated for Best Single Documentary at the BAFTA Television Awards in 2010.

Piper won the "Women to Watch: Inspiration" award at Red magazine's "Red's Hot Women Awards" in 2010.

In 2011, Katie: My Beautiful Face won the "Best Documentary Programme" award at the Broadcast Awards; Piper attended to collect the prize alongside the film-makers.

Piper was awarded the "You Can" Award at the Sainsbury's Women of the Year Awards 2011.

In 2012, Piper received a 'Pride of Britain' award.

In 2014, Piper became an Honorary Doctor of Health Sciences at Anglia Ruskin University.

Piper was appointed Officer of the Order of the British Empire (OBE) in the 2022 New Year Honours for services to charity and victims of burns and other disfigurement injuries.

== Filmography ==
Year	Title	Channel	Notes
2009	Katie: My Beautiful Face	Channel 4	Documentary
2009	60 Minutes	Nine Network (Australia)	Interview
2009	The TV Show	Channel 4	Discussion
Unknown	Live From Studio Five	Channel 5	Interview
Unknown	Woman's Hour	BBC Radio 4	Interview
Unknown	BBC Breakfast	BBC One	Interview
Unknown	This Morning	ITV	Interview
2009	Alternative Christmas Message	Channel 4	Message about Piper's experiences
2011	Alternative Christmas Message	Channel 4	"Just Be Yourself"
2010	20/20	ABC (US)	Interview
2011	Katie: My Beautiful Friends	Channel 4 & OWN (US)	Documentary
2012	Katie: The Science of Seeing Again	Channel 4	Documentary
2012	Hotel GB	Channel 4	Participant
2013	The Secret Millions	Channel 4	Participant
2013	Gok Live: Stripping for Summer	Channel 4	Participant
2013	Celebrity Deal or No Deal	Channel 4	Box-opener
2014–2015	Bodyshockers	Documentary	
2016–present	Never Seen a Doctor	Channel 4	Presenter
2018	Strictly Come Dancing	BBC One	Partnered with Gorka Marquez and was the third to be eliminated.
2020–present	Songs of Praise	BBC One	Feature presenter
2021–present	Loose Women	ITV	Panellist
2021	Car SOS	National Geographic	Guest
2022–present	Katie Piper's Breakfast Show	ITV	Presenter
2022	Celebrity The Wall	BBC	Contestant
2022	Celebrity Antiques Road Trip	BBC Two	Herself
2023	Katie Piper's Jailhouse Mums	W	Presenter
2025	Richard Osman's House of Games	BBC Two	Contestant
