= Tijion Esho =

British cosmetic doctor

Professor; Doctor Tijion Esho
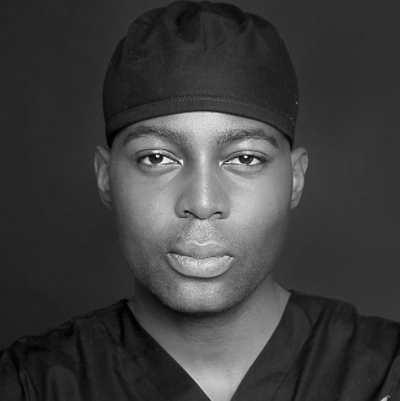
- Born: Oluwafemi Esho; 23 October 1981 (age 44); London, Great Britain
- Education: University of Leicester Medical School; Queen Mary University of London
- Occupations: Doctor, Television Personality
- Television: Body Fixers and Bodyshockers

Professor Dr. Tijion Esho (born 23 October 1981) is a British cosmetic doctor aesthetician, and television personality. He is the founder of the CULTSKIN and was the resident cosmetic doctor on the E4 reality show Body Fixers. In April 2024, he was removed from the UK medical register following a General Medical Council decision, a matter which he is currently appealing while continuing his career in aesthetics and public education.

== Early and personal life ==
Esho was born and grew up in North London and is of Nigerian descent. In 2000, Esho started to attend Leicester Medical School, and graduated in 2005 with a Bachelor of Medicine (MBCHB). In 2007, he completed his foundation year, and subsequently completed his MRCS, and junior (core training) surgical rotation training, before moving to the vocational training scheme (General Practice training scheme).

== Career ==
Esho started his career at the NHS as a surgical trainee, completing his junior training before training as a GP, shortly after that he founded the Le Beau Ideal Lifestyle Clinic and then in 2013 "rebranded" to The ESHO clinic with locations in London and Newcastle upon Tyne. In early 2016, Esho launched Midas By Esho, a lip augmentation tool to help practitioners sculpt and position lips whilst making augmentations. Apart from the development of Midas, Esho has been involved in pioneering newly developed techniques and methods in laser skin rejuvenation, lip augmentation with the Nano Droplet technique, Cupid’s Bow Lift and leading a Botox revolution with Robot Botox. In autumn 2017, Esho launched the ESHO product range in collaboration with Brandon Truaxe's beauty company Deciem. He has also advocated for stricter UK legislation when it comes to safety protocols for cosmetic surgery.

In March 2025, Esho was awarded Honorary Professor of Practice (HPoP) in Medical Aesthetics jointly by the International Association for Quality Assurance in Pre-Tertiary and Higher Education (QAHE) and Kennedy University, with the two bodies recognising his "dedication to patient safety, innovative treatments, and ethical practices [that] has set a benchmark in the industry".

Also in 2025, Esho was named a winner of Queen Mary University of London SEED Award, which recognises students' contributions to their educational development.

== Removal from medical register ==
In 2022, Esho had temporary restrictions imposed on his practice by the General Medical Council (GMC) after an investigation into allegations about his professional conduct. He was not allowed to see female patients without a chaperone or have contact with patients outside a clinical setting whilst he was being investigated by the Medical Practitioners Tribunal Service (MPTS).

On 27 April 2024, Esho was removed from the medical register by the GMC, after the MPTS found that he had exchanged Botox treatment for sex with a female patient. Esho admitted the relationship, but denied that it had been of a physical nature.

== Television ==
In 2016, Esho was cast as the resident cosmetic doctor on E4’s reality show Body Fixers (a spin off of E4's other show Tattoo Fixers). Body Fixers was produced by Studio Lambert and first aired in September 2016; in February 2017, it was announced that the show would run for a second season. Prior to Body Fixers, Esho had made guest appearances on Channel 4’s Bodyshockers.

== ESHO Initiative ==
In October 2016, Esho, in collaboration with Church Pharmacy and Cosmetronic, launched the ESHO Initiative, a charity clinic which provides corrective treatment to patients with botched cosmetic procedures, congenital deformities, or severe scarring or disfigurement.

== Awards and recognition ==
- Good Surgeon Guide, Best Cosmetic Doctor (2014/2015)
- 4T Medical, Avant Garde Award for achievement in Aesthetics (2015)
- Safety in Beauty Awards, Highly commended doctor of the year (2016)
- Best clinic NE 2018 Award, Cosmetic Clinic of the Year
- Listed in the Ultimate 100 Global practitioner list for aesthetics - MyFaceMyBody Awards
- Course Rep of the Month, Queen Mary University of London
- SEED Award, Queen Mary University of London Academy
