= Bodyshockers =

- Also known as: Bodyshockers: Nips, Tucks and Tattoos
- Genre: Documentary
- Presented by: Katie Piper
- Narrated by: Katie Piper
- Country of origin: United Kingdom
- Original language: English
- No. of series: 3
- No. of episodes: 18 (at end June 2016)

Production
- Executive producer: Oliver Wright
- Producer: Jude Parker
- Running time: 49 minutes
- Production company: Remarkable Television

Original release
- Network: Channel 4
- Release: 30 January 2014 – 16 June 2016

Bodyshockers (also known from the second series onwards as Bodyshockers: Nips, Tucks and Tattoos) is a Channel 4 documentary series fronted by Andover-born presenter, author, and acid attack survivor Katie Piper. The programme meets people from across the United Kingdom who either regret past cosmetic surgery or body art procedures and wish these to be reversed, or who are planning to undergo such procedures, often for the first time: in each edition, one of those planning to undergo the modification will meet with one of those who plans reversal of similar work, in order to discuss the potential pitfalls of the surgery. Bodyshockers first aired in early 2014; a second series followed in 2015 and a third season began airing in January 2016. The program is the first of Katie Piper's Channel 4 projects to be reordered beyond its initial run.

== History ==
In the spring of 2013 it was announced that Katie Piper would be involved in two new projects for Channel 4, to be produced by Endemol-owned production outfit Remarkable Television. One of these was a live fashion series helmed by Gok Wan; this show, Gok Live: Stripping for Summer aired in early summer 2013. The other project announced around the same time was a Piper-fronted documentary project, then going by the working title Undo Me, which was to look at cosmetic and surgical procedures, and give advice to those looking to restore a more natural look having previously undergone treatments they now regret. It was initially anticipated that Undo Me would broadcast in late 2013 as a series of six programmes.

The new programme developed as Undo Me eventually came to air in early 2014 having been reduced to a four-part run and acquired the new title Bodyshockers: each episode of the initial run also received a sub-title relating to one of the themes covered in the episode (though this led to two editions both titled My Tattoo Hell.) Episodes were transmitted weekly on Thursday nights from 30 January 2014.

In summer 2014 it was confirmed that a second series of Bodyshockers had been commissioned by Channel 4 - the new episodes entered production in autumn 2014 for a scheduled transmission early in 2015. Bodyshockers thus becomes the first of Piper's programmes to be reordered by C4 for a second run. This second series has seen the demise of on-air episode titles, as the show has acquired the sub-title "Nips, Tucks and Tattoos" for all transmitted episodes, but individual episode titles continue to be listed on the Channel 4 website. The second series began transmitting on Monday nights from 5 January 2015, transferring to Wednesday nights part-way through the run.

In February 2015, part-way through the broadcast run of series two, it was confirmed that a third series of Bodyshockers had been ordered by Channel 4.

Past episodes of Bodyshockers have been re-run on Channel 4, 4seven and E4.

== Episode guide ==
=== Series one ===
Episode	Title	Description	Airdate
1.1	My Tattoo Hell (I)	Katie meets people who regret their tattoos, including Grant, who had an offensive tattoo on his eyelid after a bar bet with his brother; Dominic, who had his partner's name tattooed on his neck shortly before their breakup; and Merlissa, who had a large tattoo across her chest; all three seek the removal of their body art. Katie also meets a now-OAP whose tattooed naked body appeared on a Supertramp album cover, and the self-proclaimed 'King Body Art' who has tattoos to 80% of his body, including a blue penis in honour of his favourite football team. Tattoo virgin Dija, who wants a lion tattooed on her back, is introduced to Merlissa in an attempt to make her think twice about the big cat.	30 January 2014
1.2	My Piercing Hell	A look at body piercing. Katie meets Emily, whose stretched earlobe was ripped by an unknown assailant during a night out in her hometown of Croydon, and beautician Jodie, who plans on adding to her existing tattoos and piercings with a dermal punch into the top of her ear. Jodie and Emily meet to discuss the potential pitfalls of ear modification. Katie also introduces us to Laura, whose glued-in hair extensions have damaged her natural locks; Lylah, a trainee doctor who has dermal fillers injected into her feet such that she can wear high heels constantly; Cherelle, who undergoes a 'dimpleplasty' operation to punch dimples into her cheeks; and Pete, who has a large tattoo of P!nk on his back, which some people have suggested looks more like Justin Bieber.	6 February 2014
1.3	My Tattoo Hell (II)	Filmed partly in Magaluf. Katie meets Stefan, who awoke from a drunken night out to find the phrase "Barry is a twat!" tattooed on his arm - with no recollection of who Barry is. Katie also encounters Manc holidaymaker Liz, who wants to prove she's the 'bee's knees' with an apian leg tattoo - but can Katie persuade her to think twice? Also featured are Jeema, who regrets having a 'lucky dragon' tattoo on her bikini line; Callum, whose stretched earlobes have served him poorly in job interviews; Claire, who lacks the confidence to wear skirts due to a large and colourful thigh tattoo inked by her former partner ahead of a tattoo art contest; and Heather, who undergoes radical eyebrow implant surgery.	13 February 2014
1.4	My Big Boob Hell	Katie meets Nicola, who now regrets the breast enlargement surgery she previously underwent, and is seeking a reduction. Katie also meets Flame, who is unhappy with her figure and looking to get implants; Nicola and Flame discuss the potential pitfalls of bust surgery. Katie also joins Ashlea, who undergoes a procedure to tattoo a heart-shaped areola around her nipple. We are also introduced to Antoinette, whose prior use of tight weaves has left her hair patchy, leading her to undergo a hair transplant operation, Scott, who has a three-dimensional subdermal implant, and Emma, a pantomime fan looking to remove a tattoo of Lucy Benjamin.	20 February 2014

=== Series two ===
The individual episode titles listed for this series are those as given on the Channel 4 website - on-screen, all episodes were subtitled Nips, Tucks and Tattoos.

Episode	Title	Description	Airdate
2.1	Face Tattoos, Extreme Facelifts and Sliced Ear Lobes	Katie meets Lee, who lost his job when a drunken night with friends led to a teardrop tattoo on his face; Lee talks to Charlie, a 20-year-old planning a facial tattoo. We meet Leon, who has an elephant face tattooed above his genital area; Katie undergoes her own laser tattoo removal in a bid to show him how it works. After years of wearing heavy earrings, Amy has been left with earlobes resembling Monster Munch and needs them stitched back together; tattooist Cammy discusses his own art and inking his extended family; and Rachel undergoes a 'lunch break facelift' procedure.	5 January 2015
2.2	Cut-Price Boobs and Tattooed Hair	Katie meets Wrexham's Hannah, who wants to reverse her earlier breast augmentation and reduce her GG-cup bust in order to be taken more seriously as she trains for her new job with the police. Hannah meets with Savannah, who is planning a bust enlargement, and Savannah witnesses Hannah's reduction operation. Elsewhere, Katie meets Joel, who shows off his extreme piercing and stretching portfolio, including holes in his cheeks which he can brush his teeth through, and Holly, who plans to get a crude tattoo of a penis removed from her back. Also, Sarah wants her stretched earlobes sewn up; and Adam gets tattooed-on hair.	12 January 2015
2.3	Ears, Boobs and an Hour Glass Figure	Brazil-born Rodrigo, who has spent over £125,000 on cosmetic surgery meets Hannah, who wants to undergo multiple surgeries at once, including liposuction and breast and buttock lifts, in her quest for an hourglass figure. Stacey, a mother of young children, has 65 tattoos removed; Ernesto, who attempted DIY surgery on his stretched earlobes, has them closed professionally; and there are two hair treatments: ahead of her impending wedding, Natalie looks to repair areas of her hair weakened by her earlier use of the Croydon facelift, with hair transplant surgery, whilst tree surgeon Michael has follicles from his scalp relocated to his face such that he can grow a beard.	21 January 2015
2.4	Lips, Scalpelling and Giant Tattoos	Katie meets Rakin, who wants his first tattoo to be a statement piece covering his entire back as far as his buttocks. Rakin meets with Lissani, who wants the large and colourful tattoo on her chest - an act of youthful rebellion against her strict upbringing - removed now she's a wife and mother. Lips also feature prominently, with Dean, who wants to reverse a past lip-filler technique, and Charlie, who undergoes an invasive new form of pout-boosting surgery. Dental nurse Jodie looks to get her tattoo of a geisha-style face removed from her hip, but struggles with the pain of the laser. And Katie witnesses the surgical earlobe-stretching procedure known as 'scalpelling' take place.	28 January 2015
2.5	Nose Job, Boob Reduction and Thai Tattoo	Katie meets Dean from Sussex, who wants a large-scale tattoo of a tiger and a dragon across his upper body, based on the design of a T-shirt he bought whilst on holiday in Thailand; and Cher from Glasgow, who wants a skull-and-crossbones tattoo removed from her stomach area; will viewing Cher's laser removal at close quarters prompt Dean to think twice? We also join Gemma, who regrets her three earlier breast enlargements and now, hoping to set a better example to her young daughters, looks to have her implants removed; celebrity-watcher Zahra, who undergoes a dermal filler injection technique to get a more Kim Kardashian-esque nose; Stoke boxer Nathan, who wants to remove his neck and chest tattoo, designed to resemble a pendant of Rosary beads, ahead of his wedding; and Kellie from Winchester, who undergoes microdermabrasion after her 300 home hair dye sessions over the years left her with thinning locks.	4 February 2015
2.6	Lips, Eyebrows and an Instant Eye Lift	Abi Clarke, a former participant in The Only Way is Essex, discusses the difficulties she faced after undergoing lip filler procedures to fit in with her TOWIE castmates. Abi meets recently married Sian from Swansea, who is planning to enhance her own lips to more closely resemble those of Angelina Jolie. Elsewhere, Katie meets Sarah from Leicester, who had eyebrows permanently tattooed on but now wants the unnatural-looking brows removed, and Jordan, a young man who undergoes cosmetic surgery monthly - first having Botox at age 17 - in his quest to emulate the look of his idol, Kim Kardashian. We also visit Xeena, an 18-year-old selfie-addicted Londoner who wants fillers injected into her face to make her eyes look less baggy, and Essex beautician Angela, who in her younger days had 'Mummy' tattooed on her neck - now a mother herself, Angela is embarrassed of the tattoo; However, getting it removed will mean staying away from her beloved sunbeds and fake tan...	11 February 2015

=== Series three ===
A third series, slated to contain eight episodes, was produced in 2015 for transmission from the start of 2016. This series introduces a new titlecard, though as for series 2 individual episode titles are not used onscreen - the titles given here are again those given on the C4 web guide. Seven episodes aired weekly on Wednesday nights in January and February 2016, with an eighth held back to follow at a later date, eventually turning up as a standalone broadcast in June, several weeks after Piper's new format Never Seen a Doctor had completed its initial three-part run.

Episode	Title	Description	Airdate
3.1	Scarification, Boobs and X-Rated Tattoos	Katie meets Jo, a butcher from Dunstable planning to undergo scarification; and also talks to Chantelle Houghton, who wants to reverse her post-Celebrity Big Brother bust enhancement. Jack from Bristol, who plans a giant tattoo depicting himself performing a sexual act, meets Mark from Essex, who wants a 'for the laydeez' tattoo, a relic of his clubbing days, removed now he's settled down. Another Bristolian, senior citizen Ted, has undergone modification to look like his beloved parrots, and goes on a blind date with the birds in tow. And Poppy from Brighton undergoes surgery on a stretched earlobe left dangling after being ripped on a clothes hanger.	6 January 2016
3.2	Troublesome Tatt, Extreme Brandings and Extensive Stretching	Barman Lewis had a Henry vacuum cleaner tattoo on his groin at 16, but it now puts off sexual partners, so he plans its removal, but struggles to cope with the laser.Model Anya from Manchester, who is planning a large moth tattoo across her chest, meets bride-to-be Ruth from Kent, who has a section of skin surgically removed from her chest in order to destroy a prior tattoo ahead of her wedding. Katie also meets Jenya from Russia who has stretched his ears, nose and lips, and wears a lip plate; and comic-book artist Louie, who undergoes human branding to burn his artwork signature into his arm. Mancunian fishmonger David has, among several religious tattoos, an image of Jesus Christ which looks more like a bearded lady on his chest: his tattoo-artist girlfriend Hannah designs a tattoo to cover it.	13 January 2016
3.3	Animal Tatts and Skull Implants	Former Hooters waitress Andrea wants to have her five-year-old FF-cup breast implants removed and revert to her natural figure. Andrea meets with lingerie fitter Emma, who plans to enlarge her A-cup bust by six cup sizes. Two animal lovers feature: Janey wants a monkey tattoo on her navel removed now she's taken up a new fitness regime, whilst Italian Amy, who has modifications to over 80% of her body, many animal-inspired, including a split tongue, tattooed eyeballs and subdermal implants, talks about her choices. We also meet Lee, whose subdermal implant was bought with a gift voucher from his partner Steph, and Bexhill lifeguard Sam, who wants to cover a hip area tattoo of a former partner's name with a Cheryl Fernandez-Versini-inspired rose design.	20 January 2016
3.4	New Boobs and 1000 Piercings	Swede Anders has undergone thousands of piercings, including over 100 in his face, starting as a means of overcoming a phobia of needles. Welder Paul has tattoos all over his body, but now, having started a family, wants all his ink removed over the next decade; he meets Jess from West Yorkshire, who has no prior modifications, but wants to cover much of her body in animal tattoos. Katie meets Transgender cabaret performer 'Miss Kimberley', who is crowdfunding to fund enlargement of the small breasts she'd grown through HRT. Dog-loving restaurant manager Lolly has paw prints on her buttock in honour of Missy, her first pet, but now wants the piece, disliked by her loved ones, removed. And Londoner Mari undergoes a hair transplant in order to repair damage caused by the wearing of hair extensions, similar to that suffered by Naomi Campbell.	27 January 2016
3.5	Spider-Man and Multiple Piercings	Katie meets delivery driver Stuart from Portsmouth, who tattooed a crude penis on his thigh while drunk; she also meets Swiss man Pascal, who has had his head and torso tattooed red and plans to continue on to create a 'body suit' of colour. Katie Price-idolising Hannah from Sheffield, who has become self-conscious about her now-sagging enhanced GG-cup bust and plans removal of her implants, meets with mum-of-two Aisha from Kettering, who wants an increased bust, with the aim of achieving a figure like Holly Willoughby and better fitting in with her yummy mummy friends. Midwife Fenella, who's been getting tattooed and pierced for 25 years, gets a dermal punch through her upper ear, and reformed former wild child Emily from London, now a clean-living yoga instructor, undergoes laser treatment to remove a "Dirty and Reckless" stomach tattoo she got at 18.	3 February 2016
3.6	X-Rated Tattoos and Inflatable N-Cups	Katie meets German-born Martina Big, who uses saline injections to pump up her bust size. Joe, who plans to cover up a four-letter tattoo on his knees which is holding back his career in the holiday industry, meets London childminder Sara, who wants leg tattoos with a dark and bloodied design. Tyne had eyebrows tattooed on after over-plucking in her youth left her brow bare - but the tattoos were too high on her face, leaving a 'double brow' effect when her real eyebrows grew back. Jade talks about the 'blackwork' tattoos she's being given by her husband, expert tattooist Glen. And fitness fan Julian has his ten-year-old silicone pectoral implants removed.	10 February 2016
3.7	Joint Nose Jobs and a Skull	Selfie-loving Manchester sisters Karyse and Deanna plan to jointly have surgeries to reduce their noses to a similar size to that of Karrueche Tran; they meet with Lucy, who requires reconstructive surgery as an earlier £4000 cosmetic nose job - which she underwent after bullying knocked her confidence - has begun to collapse. We also meet Italian alternative model Christian, who has tattoos to over 60% of his body, including blacked-out eyeballs, in order to create an 'alien' look; school bus driver Malcolm from Bedfordshire, who undergoes scarification to place a large skull design on his forearm; hairdresser Katie from Surrey, who having undergone two prior breast enlargement operations, now wants her bust size reduced; and footballer Georgia from Stourbridge, who one night received a drunken 'Marry me?' home tattoo from her then partner, and now wants it covered with a hand-print design.	17 February 2016
3.8	Magnetic Fingers and a Lumpy Ear Lobe	Katie meets Surrey graduate Emily, who developed keloid scarring on her upper ear following a scaffold piercing at the age of 17, and also talks to Rolf, who holds the world record as the most modified man, with over 500 tattoos and piercings, including magnetic implants in his fingertips, and who was once refused entry to Dubai due to his 'horn' subdermals. Cheshire beauty therapist Kelly, left with lumpy lips and a 'duck' pout after having lip fillers four times in a year, meets with Mercedes from Leicester, who wants to uplift her naturally down-turning mouth. Birmingham's Jill has laser surgery to remove a self-inflicted tattoo of her own name on her groin. Andy of Glasgow looks to cover a nine-year-old 'Fuck Life' tattoo across his stomach with a new dragon design, now that he has young children.	16 June 2016
