= Daith piercing =

Type of ear piercing

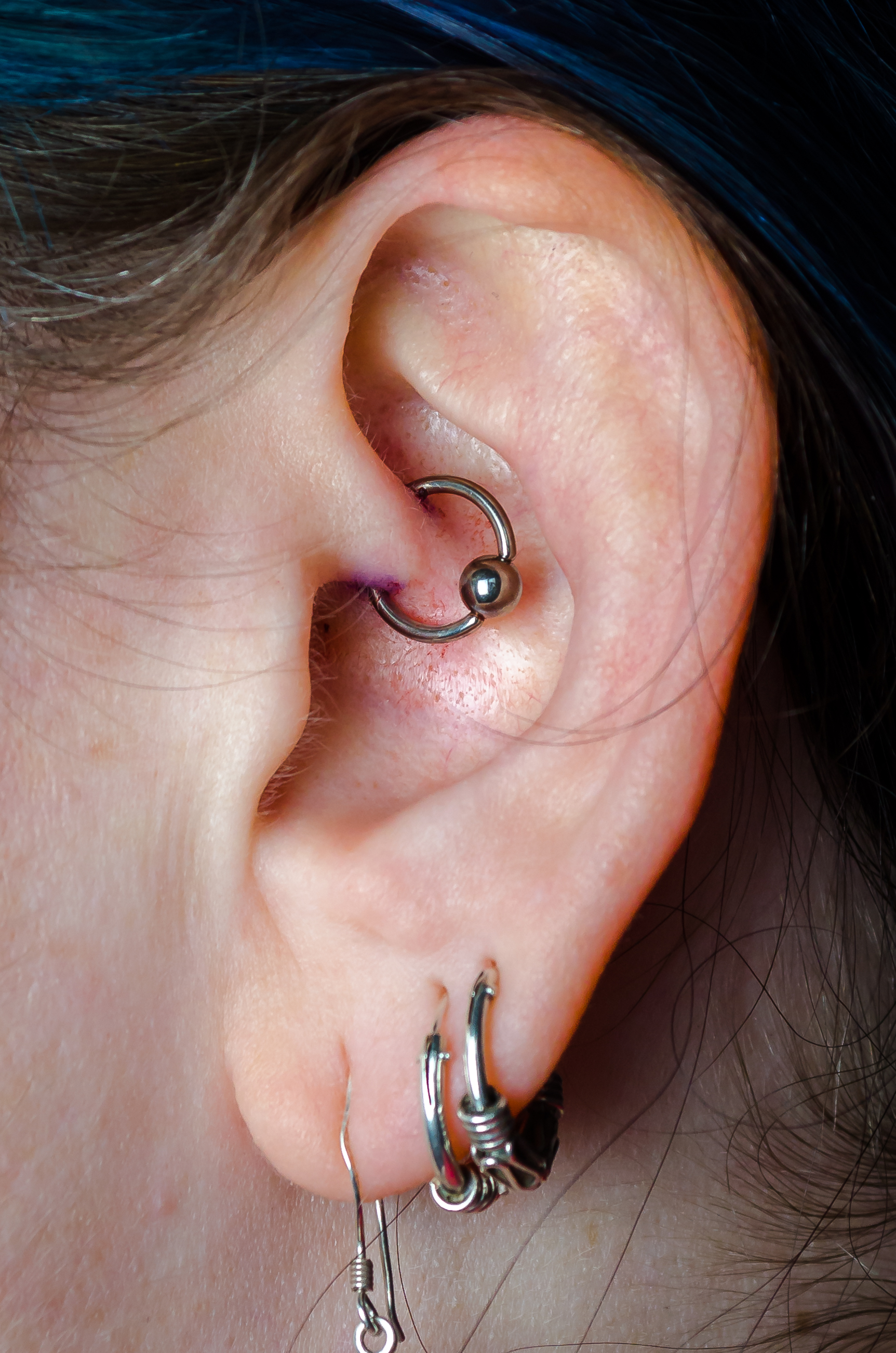
A woman's left ear, showing a daith piercing

A daith (/dɑθ/; nonstandard: /deɪθ/) piercing is an ear piercing that passes through the ear's innermost cartilage fold, the crus of the helix.

The piercing is usually performed with a straight hollow needle. Captive bead rings are the most common jewelry type used. It can take from six to nine months for a daith piercing to heal.

== History ==
A client of Erik Dakota, who is said to have been studying Hebrew in college, first named this piercing "da'at", meaning "knowledge" (Hebrew: דעת [ˈdaʕaθ]). Her reasoning was that the piercer must have been very "smart" to figure out how to do the piercing. This piercing was first brought into the public eye in the early 1990s in Fakir Musafar's Body Play, in the same issue that also showcased the Industrial Piercing, the Apadydoe, and a large gauge conch piercing.

Fakir Musafar noted: "The Daith piercing was co-created in 1992 by Erik Dakota and a Jewish woman piercing client with a metaphysical bent. ... A true Daith must be done in such a way that the bottom part of the ring appears to come directly out of the ear canal. If one can see both the entrance and exit hole of the ring, it is not a true Daith. The technique for this piercing is quite advanced, requires a specifically curved needle and was devised by Erik Dakota."

== Medical claims ==
The area in which the piercing is placed within the ear is said to stimulate a pressure point associated with the vagus nerve. It has been claimed that the piercing can cure chronic migraines and tension headaches by activating vagal afferents (sensory nerve fibers that carry information from internal organs to the nervous system). However, a review of 186 non-clinical studies found that while patients reported lower pain after receiving the piercing, symptoms returned in the following weeks or months. The authors concluded that current evidence does not support daith piercing for treatment of migraines or tension headaches.
