= Tragus piercing =

Cosmetic perforation of part of the ear

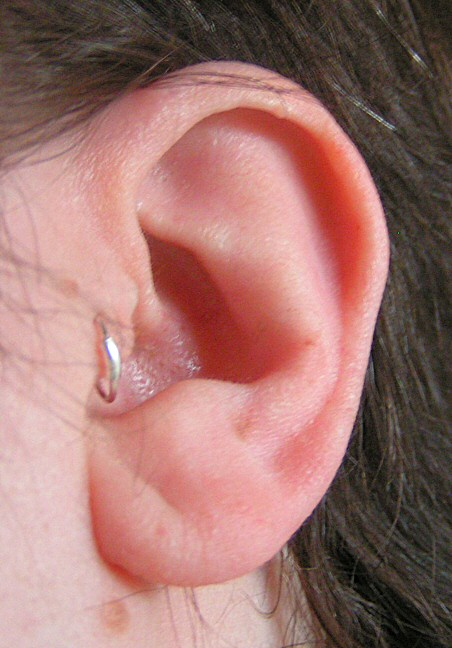
- Location: Tragus
- Jewelry: Barbell, captive bead ring
- Healing: 12 to 52 weeks (3 to 12 months)

A tragus piercing is the perforation of the tragus, which projects immediately in front of the ear canal, for the purpose of inserting and wearing a piece of jewelry. The piercing itself is usually made with a small gauge hollow piercing needle, and typical jewelry would be a small diameter captive bead ring or small gauge post style piercing jewelry. A related piercing is known as the antitragus piercing.

== History ==
The tragus piercing has no ties to any ancient culture and was first established around the time of the rook and daith piercings in the 1980's. The name comes from the medical term of the flap of skin that is pierced. The popularity of tragus piercings began to increase around 2005, according to a BBC report.

== Jewelry ==
Barbells, captive bead rings and flat-backed earring studs are the most common types of jewelry worn in tragus piercings.

== Process ==
The hollow, low-gauge needle used for the piercing can be either straight or curved, depending on the piercer's preference. Tragus piercings are generally not very painful, due to the small number of nerve endings in the tragus, but the sound made may be uncomfortable due to its proximity to the eardrum. Most tragus piercings will take between 3 and 6 months to heal, however some might take up to 12 months to be fully healed.
