= Mark Esho =

British entrepreneur (born 1962)

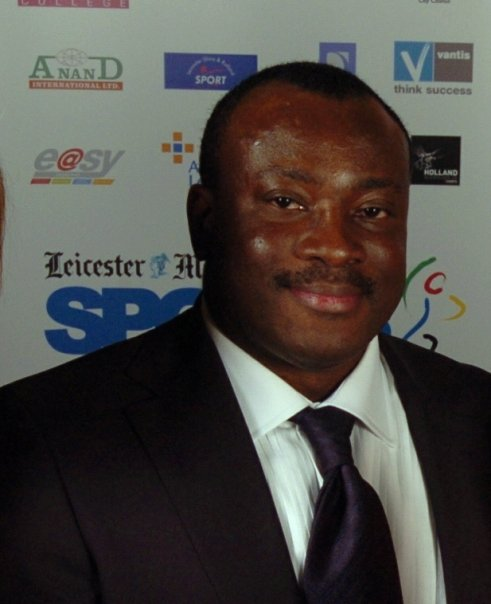
Mark Esho at the Leicester Mercury Sports Awards in January 2008.

Mark Abayomi Esho MBE (born 17 August 1962) is a British entrepreneur. He is the founder and co-owner of both Easy Internet Services Ltd and Easy Internet Solutions Lt.

== Background ==
Esho was born in Leicestershire in 1962. At the age of five, he contracted polio, leaving him paralysed from the neck down. He was originally given a 10% chance of survival, but was eventually able to regain limited mobility.

Esho moved to Nigeria at the age of eight to start mainstream school, before returning to Leicester at 18. He later completed an MBA at De Montfort University.

== Business career ==
Esho worked for seven years in Leicester as a Service Manager for Mosaic, a local charity. Due to chronic fatigue caused by his childhood polio, he decided to start his own business instead of continuing a nine-to-five job.

Esho started Houses-Online in 1999, a property listing website. The project ended shortly afterwards, and Esho started a second business in 2000 under the name Rank4U. At the time it was one of only four search engine optimisation companies in the UK, and serviced clients including The Guardian and The Co-operative Group.

In the following years, Esho developed two companies simultaneously: Easy Internet Services (search engine optimisation, now under the name 123 Ranking) and Easy Internet Solutions (later Free Virtual Servers, later FVS Hosting). Both businesses were early adopters of employing remote workers, and Esho has been a vocal supporter of remote monitoring software for employees.

== Honours and recognition ==
Esho was the winner of first ever National Diversity Award for Business Excellence in September 2012. Easy Internet went on to sponsor the National Diversity Awards in Leeds the following year. In October 2012, he presented the Young Person Award at the 11th African and African Caribbean Achievement Awards.

In February 2013, Esho was interviewed on BBC Radio Leicester about his own story and government support for disabled jobseekers. In July 2013, Esho met with Prime Minister David Cameron and featured as a case study as part of the government's Disability Confident programme. Esho's continued support for disabled employees and jobseekers in the UK has also been cited by the government's Great Business initiative and the Minister of State for Disabled People at the time, Mike Penning.

In November 2013, Esho was part of the judging panel for the Leicester Mercury's "Leicestershire's Young Business Executive of the Year Award".

In 2016, Easy Internet Solutions became a patron of the Leicestershire Law Society. Later the same year, Esho was nominated at the Institute of Directors East Midlands Director of the Year Awards, which took place on 30 June 2016. He was awarded a Highly Commended certificate in the category of "Director of the Year SME – Small".

In 2019, Mark won the Institute of Director's East Midlands Director of the Year Awards for Inclusivity, making him a finalist for the nationwide awards.

Esho was appointed Member of the Order of the British Empire (MBE) in the 2022 New Year Honours for services to business.

In 2022, Mark was included in The Shaw Trust Disability Power 100 list, recognising the 100 most influential disabled people living and working in the UK.

== Writing ==
In 2018, Mark's first book, 'I Can. I Will.' was published by Rethink Press. The book describes how he contracted polio at the age of five and the effect it had on his life. It discusses the difficulties he experienced in accessing education and the abuse he suffered at the hands of his father, before eventually becoming a successful businessman. Esho covers topics such as racial discrimination and disability and ends each chapter with a reflection on his struggles and lessons he has learned. The Leicester book launch took place on Thursday 27 September 2018 at the Queen Victoria Arts Club in the city's cultural quarter. It was attended by local business representatives, Rotarians and friends and family. This was followed by a London launch hosted at Rotary HQ and attended by the Rotary polio ambassador Konnie Huq.

== Sport ==
Esho is a keen player and supporter of wheelchair sports teams. His company Easy Internet Services has sponsored The Leicester Cobras, a local wheelchair basketball club and charity, for a number of years. Esho has also participated in several wheelchair tennis tournaments. He was involved in the first ever Loughborough Wheelchair Tennis Open at Loughborough University in 2014, and the first Grantham Tennis Club wheelchair tournament in August 2015.
