= Body Play =

American body modification magazine

Body Play and Modern Primitives Quarterly was a magazine founded in 1992 and published by Fakir Musafar. It contained information, commentary and interviews pertaining to advanced topics in body modification such as human branding, suspension, contortionism and binding. The magazine was not limited to technical information and images but also contained historical information about the development of modern piercing culture, such as the origins of the daith piercing.

The magazine had difficulty growing beyond 500 subscribers and large mainstream distributors were hesitant to carry material pertaining to the alternative lifestyle depicted in the publication. These difficulties led to the termination of the magazine in 1999.

A printed compilation of photography first published in Body Play Magazine was compiled by Fakir under the title Body Play: The Self-Images of Fakir Musafar
