= Fakir Musafar =

American body piercer, photographer and BDSM figure

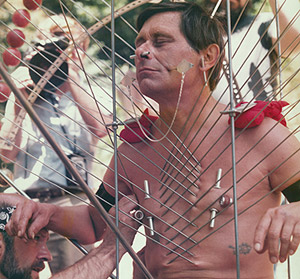
- Musafar in 1982
- Born: Roland Loomis; August 10, 1930; Aberdeen, South Dakota, U.S.
- Died: August 1, 2018 (aged 87); Menlo Park, California, U.S.
- Occupation: Performance artist
- Works: Body Play
- Movement: Modern primitive
- Spouse: Cléo Dubois
- Website: www.Fakir.org

Roland Loomis (August 10, 1930 – August 1, 2018), known professionally as Fakir Musafar, was an American performance artist considered to be one of the founders of the modern primitive movement.

== Life ==
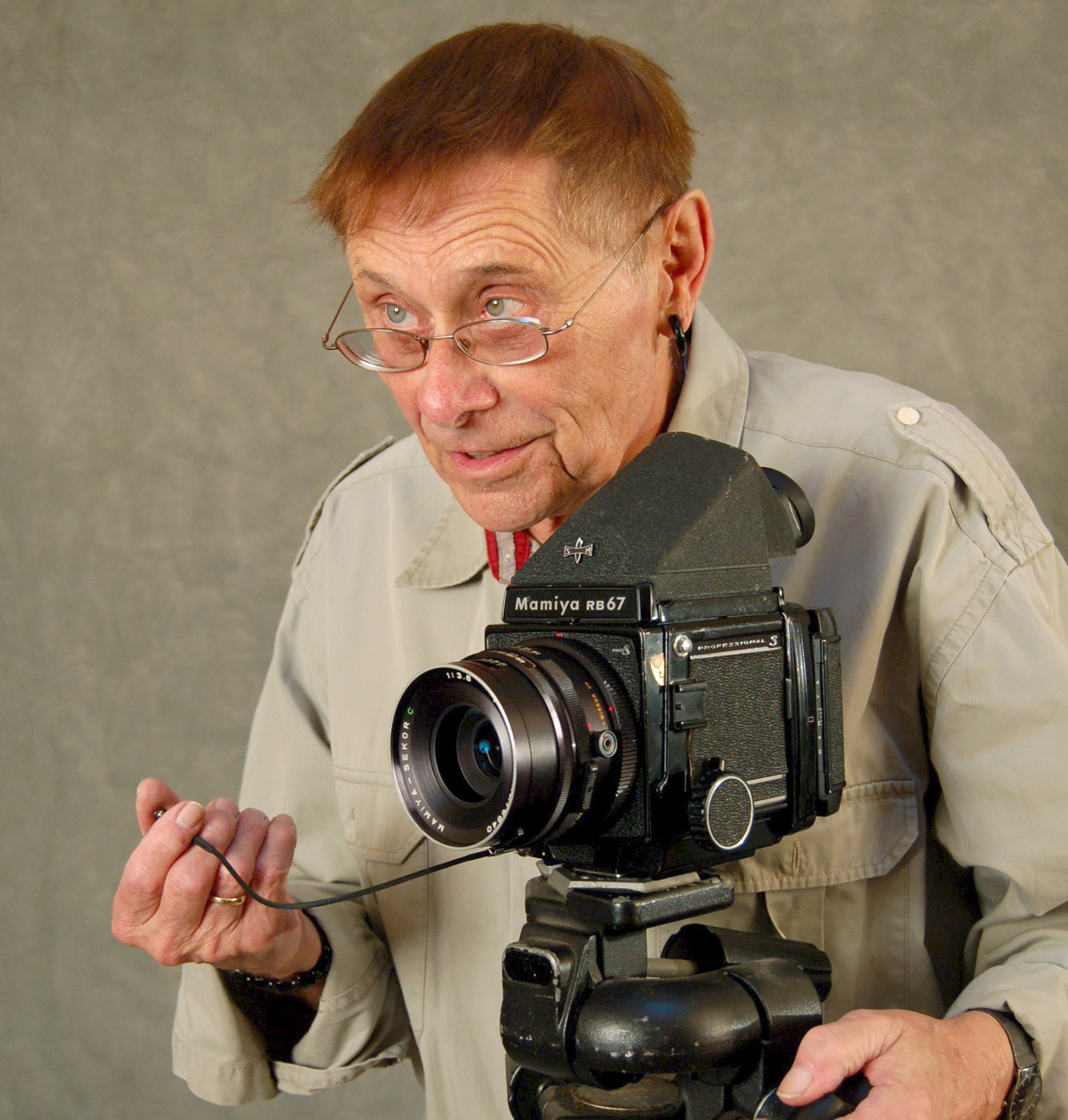
Fakir Musafar

Born Roland Loomis, he claimed at age 4 to have experienced dreams of past lives which, along with his anthropological studies, influenced his interests in body modification. He served in the army during the Korean War, and was first married for a short time in the 1960s. In 1966 or 1967, he first performed a flesh hook suspension, inspired by his viewing of anthropological works. In 1977, he gave himself the name Fakir Musafar.

In the 1985 documentary Dances Sacred and Profane, he was shown walking while wearing a device that pressed many small skewers into his upper body, and hanging from a tree by hooks in his chest, in his modified versions of other cultures' sacred ceremonies. He was an extra ('Man in hotel room') in Die Jungfrauen Maschine (The Virgin Machine) in 1988, and in 1991, he appeared in My Father Is Coming as Fakir. He was featured in the 1989 book Modern Primitives, which documented, propagated, and became influential in the modern body modification subcultures.

In 1990, he married Cléo Dubois. From 1992 until 1999, he published the magazine Body Play and Modern Primitives Quarterly, which focused on body modification topics such as human branding, suspension, contortionism, binding, and modern piercing culture. He led "Fakir Intensives" training workshops on these topics in San Francisco.

== Illness and death ==
In May 2018, Loomis announced on his website that he was suffering from terminal lung cancer. He died on the morning of 1 August 2018. His death was initially announced in a public Facebook post by his wife Cléo Dubois, and later confirmed by an obituary in Artforum.

== Criticism ==
Modern primitivism has been suggested as cultural appropriation and misrepresenting or "bundling" cultures together in a "primitive" setting, including modern primitive "adornment," with many adherents of modern primitivism believing criticisms of this movement are based largely on the views of Roland Loomis rather than the culture as a whole.

== Tributes ==
The Leather Archives and Museum, founded in 1991, once featured an exhibit about Musafar. In 1993, he received the Steve Maidhof Award for National or International Work from the National Leather Association International. In 2019, he was inducted into the Leather Hall of Fame, and he is also an inductee of the Society of Janus Hall of Fame. UC Berkeley's Bancroft Library and the Association of Professional Piercers also have large archives of his work in photography, published writings, workshops, and BodyPlay magazines. His memorial bench in Byxbee Park in Palo Alto reads "Body is the door to Spirit".

He is the subject of the documentary A Body to Live In, directed by Angelo Madsen.

== Bibliography ==
- Fakir Musafar: Spirit + Flesh, Arena Editions, 2004, ISBN 1-892041-57-X

== See also ==
- Domination & submission (BDSM)
- Risk-aware consensual kink
- Modern Primitive
- Sadomasochism
- Safe, sane and consensual
- Sexual fetishism
