= Flying Doctors =

Flying Doctors may refer to:

- Royal Flying Doctor Service, an air medical service in Australia
  - The Flying Doctors, an Australian television drama series
  - The Flying Doctor, a 1936 Australian-British film
- Los Médicos Voladores, the flying doctors, based in Latin America
- Flying Doctors of America
- Flying Doctors of Malaysia
- The Flying Doctors of East Africa, a 1969 film
  - A service of the African Medical and Research Foundation, documented by the 1969 film
