= Penile spines =

Pointed structures on the penile glans and/or shaft

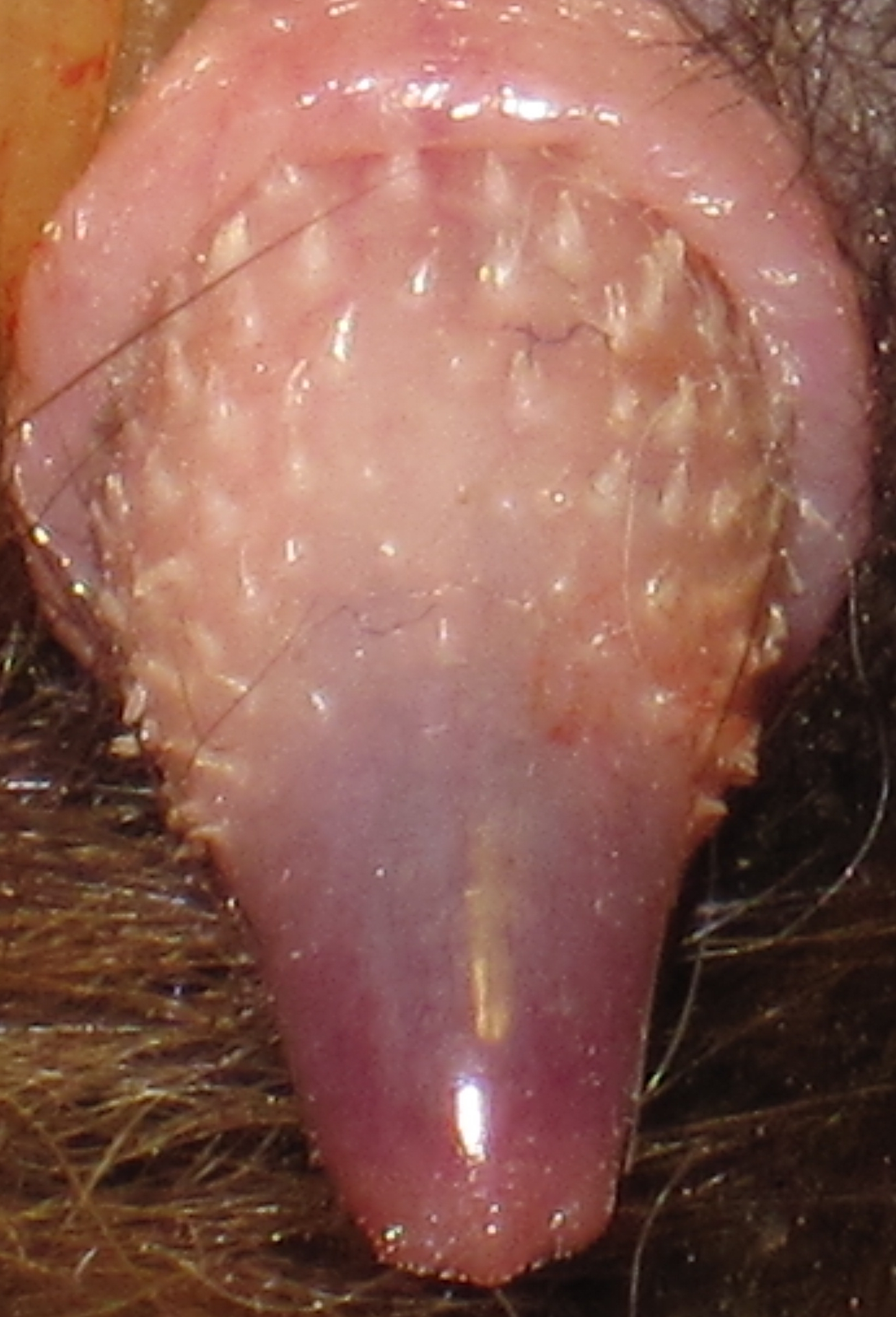
Penile spines of a domestic cat

Many mammalian species have developed keratinized penile spines along the glans or shaft, which may be evolved in sexual selection. These spines have been described as being simple, single-pointed structures (macaques) or complex with two or three points per spine (strepsirrhines). Penile spine morphology may be related to mating system.

== Non-human mammals ==
Felines, especially domestic cats, are well known for having penile spines. Upon withdrawal of a cat's penis, the spines rake the walls of the female's vagina, which may serve as a trigger for ovulation. Many other felid species have penile spines, but they are relatively small in jaguars and pumas, and do not occur in margays.

Penile spines in chimpanzees and mice are small surface projections made by the piling up of keratinized cell layers in the outermost skin surface. They occur in wombats, koalas, spotted hyenas, fossas, echidnas, primates, bats, and several rodent species.

Penile spines are often found in primate species that form copulatory plugs after mating. In galagos, penile spines may form a "genital lock" during copulation.

== Humans ==
In contrast to chimpanzees, a common morphological variant found in humans called hirsuties coronae glandis, or pearly penile papules, are substantially larger, appear to be an outpocketing of both surface and underlying connective tissue layers, and lack the rich innervation seen in other animals. These are sometimes described as vestigial remnants of penile spines. However, the relationship between the structures is still uncertain.

When the hominin lineage split into the genera Homo and Pan, a regulatory DNA sequence associated with the formation of small keratinized penile spines was lost in the Homo lineage. This simplification of penis anatomy may be associated with the sexual habits of humans. In some species which retain full expression, penile spines contribute to increased sexual sensation and quicker orgasms. An hCONDEL (highly conserved region of DNA that contains deletions in humans) located near the locus of the androgen receptor gene may be responsible for the loss of penile spines in humans.

== Birds ==
The penises of some bird species feature spines and brush-like filaments.

== See also ==
- Fordyce spots
- Sexual conflict § Spiky genitals
- Lion#Reproduction and life cycle
