= Frank Armitage =

Australian-American painter (1924–2016)

- Born: Frank Armitage; 5 September 1924; Melbourne, Australia
- Died: 4 January 2016 (aged 91); Paso Robles, California, U.S.
- Known for: painting, drawing
- Notable work: Peter Pan (1953); Lady and the Tramp (1955); Sleeping Beauty (1959); Mary Poppins (1964); Fantastic Voyage (1966); The Jungle Book (1967)
- Spouse: Patricia Ray (m. 1958–1972) Karen Connolly
- Children: 3
- Awards: NFFC Legend Award
- Website: www.armitageimages.com

Frank Armitage (5 September 1924 – 4 January 2016) was an Australian-born American painter and muralist, known for painting the backgrounds of several classic animated Disney films, designing areas of and painting murals for Walt Disney World and Tokyo DisneySea, and his biomedical visualization artwork.

== Biography ==
=== Early life and Mexican mural painting ===
Frank Armitage was born in Melbourne, Australia. There were 16 years between him and his sister, and without a sibling to play with, he turned his attention to drawing. After serving for his allotted time in the Royal Australian Air Force during World War II, he attended art school. He picked up a book about Mexican mural painters at the National Gallery of Victoria and became very interested in the Mexican mural painting movement. He then quit art school and sailed to Canada, where he worked in Montreal for 18 months to earn enough money to get to Mexico City by bus. Armitage won an international mural contest sponsored by David Alfaro Siqueiros, and in 1949, Armitage became Siqueiros's assistant. Armitage worked on many murals on public buildings throughout Mexico.

=== Work for the Walt Disney Company and art career ===
In 1952, Armitage moved to Los Angeles, California, and began working for Walt Disney Studios. One of his first projects was animation for the 1955 Disney film Lady and the Tramp. Armitage then transitioned to painting backgrounds for other Disney films, such as Peter Pan, Sleeping Beauty, Mary Poppins, The Jungle Book, and the Disneyland episode "Man in Space." Armitage became an Imagineer in 1977 and began helping to design the Disney theme parks. His work of anatomical figures helped create the Wonders of Life Pavilion in Epcot. He also painted 5,500 square feet of murals for the Safari Fare Restaurant in Walt Disney World. Several of the murals in Tokyo DisneySea are also of his creation, including nine of Theodore Roosevelt at the Teddy Roosevelt Lounge in the American Waterfront, corridor panels in the Hotel MiraCosta, the Broadway Bar, and four in the Tokyo DisneySea City Hall. After his retirement, Armitage returned to Walt Disney World to create the murals of camouflaged animals in the Pizzafari restaurant at Disney's Animal Kingdom.

Armitage made the production illustration and Academy Award-winning set designs for the 1966 sci-fi film Fantastic Voyage. He painted scenes of the interior of the human body, which were then turned into larger-than-life sets. He also created several landscape paintings for Life magazine. In 1971, he partnered with photographer Lennart Nilsson for a project on the function of the brain. Armitage created the background art for fourteen episodes of The Dick Tracy Show and nine episodes of The Mr. Magoo Show. On October 6, 1989, Armitage was given the opportunity to paint a picture of the Dalai Lama while the latter was in a meeting with six neurologists about life after death.

=== Later life ===
Armitage retired from the Disney company in 1989. He then studied Eastern medicine at the College of Oriental Medicine and traveled to China to learn acupuncture. In 2006, he donated a large portion of his medical artwork to the Biomedical Visualization Graduate Program at the University of Illinois at Chicago. It is kept in a permanent collection on campus in the Department of Biomedical and Health Information Sciences.

In early 2010, after seeing a documentary about silverback gorillas, Armitage donated several oil pencil drawings of gorillas to the Dian Fossey Gorilla Fund in Atlanta, Georgia, and the Center for Great Apes in Wauchula, Florida. The designs are printed on merchandise such as coffee mugs and T-shirts and then sold to raise money for the organizations.

Armitage volunteered with the Flying Doctors in rural Mexico. He lived near Paso Robles, California, with his wife, Karen Connolly Armitage, who is also a retired Imagineer. They ran an architectural design business called Armitage Images. He also created oil paintings and murals for private homes.

== Death ==
Armitage died at his home in Paso Robles on 4 January 2016 at the age of 91.

== Awards and honors ==
In 2006, the College of Applied Health Sciences, Biomedical Visualization Program, part of the University of Illinois at Chicago, established the annual Frank Armitage Lecture Series, which honors Armitage's anatomical artwork.

On July 18, 2009, at the Anaheim Crowne Plaza Resort in Anaheim, California, Armitage was honored as a Disney legend and given the Disney Legend Award by the National Fantasy Fan Club (NFFC), a nonprofit organization dedicated to honoring the life of Walt Disney.
