= 10q26 deletion =

- 10q26 deletion has an autosomal dominant inheritance pattern.
- Specialty: Medical genetics

10q26 deletion is an extremely rare genetic syndrome caused by terminal deletion of the long arm of chromosome 10 at 10q26. It is usually a de novo mutation. Symptoms can include delayed growth, intellectual disability, microcephaly, triangular face, strabismus, hypertelorism, prominent nasal bridge, beaked or prominent nose, low-set dysplastic ears, various congenital heart defects, cryptorchidism, other anogenital anomalies, defect of hands/feet, limb contractures, abnormal behavior with hyperactivity, attention deficit, and destructive tendencies. People with the syndrome are less likely to have hearing deficits compared to those where the missing genetic material includes 10q25. The syndrome was first reported in 1979. Interstitial deletions including parts of 10q26 also have been reported, but they are more rare.

== Signs and symptoms ==
Individuals who have 10q26 deletion syndrome frequently experience delays in speech and the development of motor abilities, including sitting, crawling, and walking. Some people never speak well at all. ADHD, impulsivity, seizures, or autistic traits that interfere with social interaction and communication can all be symptoms of the condition.

Those who have 10q26 deletion syndrome may have a broad nasal bridge, a prominent or beaked nose, micrognathia, low-set deformed ears, a thin upper lip, and microcephaly. Many of the afflicted people have strabismus and hypertelorism. This illness can cause some people to develop webbed necks.

10q26 deletion syndrome may present with less typical indications and symptoms. Scoliosis, clinodactyly, and restricted range of motion in the elbows and other joints are examples of skeletal issues. In affected individuals, slow growth can also occur both before and after birth. Men who suffer from this illness may develop hypopadias, cryptorchidism, or a micropenis, among other genital abnormalities. Affected individuals with 10q26 deletion syndrome may also experience breathing difficulties, heart deformities, renal abnormalities, recurring infections, hearing, or visual issues.

== Causes ==
A person who has a 10q26 deletion syndrome lacks 3.5–17 million base pairs, or 3.5–17 megabases (Mb), from location q26 on chromosome 10. This abnormality is inherited in an autosomal dominant manner, which means that one copy of the mutated chromosome in each cell is enough to cause the ailment.
