= Los Médicos Voladores =

Organization

Los Médicos Voladores provide free medical and dental clinics to Mexicans, other Latin Americans and the migrant populations of the Southwestern United States.
