= Flying Doctors of America =

- Flying Doctors of America
- Formation: 1990
- Founder: Allan Gathercoal
- Type: Non-profit
- Website: https://fdoamerica.org/

Flying Doctors of America was founded by Allan M. Gathercoal in 1990. Currently it has more than 7000 volunteers in association.

The organization brings together physicians, dentists, physician assistants, nurse practitioners, registered nurses, pharmacists, and other non-medical volunteers who give medical and dental care to people in developing countries throughout the world. All of the missions are short-term (one or two weeks), professionally managed and affordable. Each team member makes a small donation to the organization which is used to cover the cost of transportation, lodging and mission expenses. Each year the schedule of missions is posted on the organization's website.

The organization is a 501(c)(3) charitable organization registered as Medical Mercy Missions, Inc. with the IRS and in the state of Georgia, DBA: Flying Doctors of America.

It is listed in the Encyclopedia of Associations, published by Thomson Gale.

It is listed in Idealist - Directory of nonprofit web resources: 16000 organizations in 130 countries.

In April 2020, pilot and urologist Dr. William Kirby, a volunteer of Flying Doctors America and former mayor of Auburn, California, died in a plane crash at 72. He was also chairman of the Tumor Board at Sutter Auburn Faith Hospital. Dr. William Kirby flew to rural parts of the world to give free medical services and free clinics.

== Medical Mercy Missions ==
Medical Mercy Missions, Inc. is the mother organization of Flying Doctors of America.

The organization is a 501(c)(3) charitable organizations registered with the IRS and in the state of Georgia.
