= Corpus cavernosum clitoris =

One of a pair of regions in the clitoris that contain the blood during erection

Corpus cavernosum of clitoris
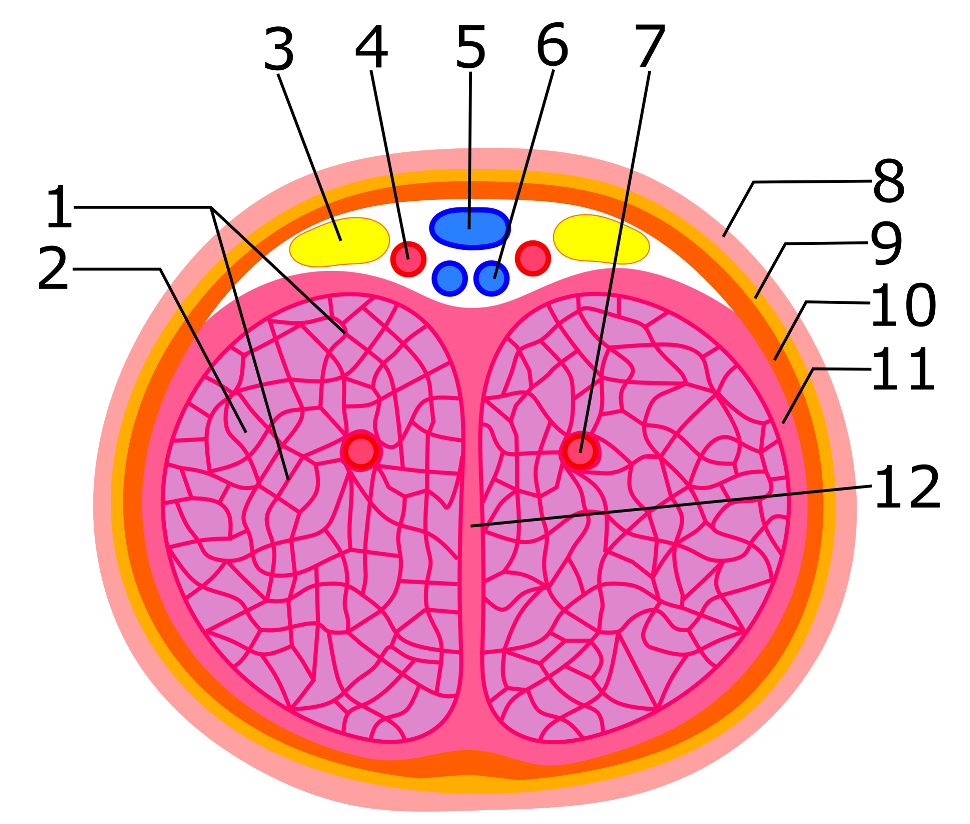
- Internal anatomy of clitoral body: 1. Trabeculae of corpora cavernosa of clitoris; 2. Cavernous spaces; 3. Dorsal nerve of clitoris; 4. Dorsal artery of clitoris; 5. Superficial dorsal veins of clitoris; 6. Deep dorsal vein of clitoris; 7. Deep artery of clitoris; 8. Skin; 9. Membranous layer of subcutaneous tissue; 10. Clitoral fascia; 11. Tunica albuginea; 12. Septum of clitoris.

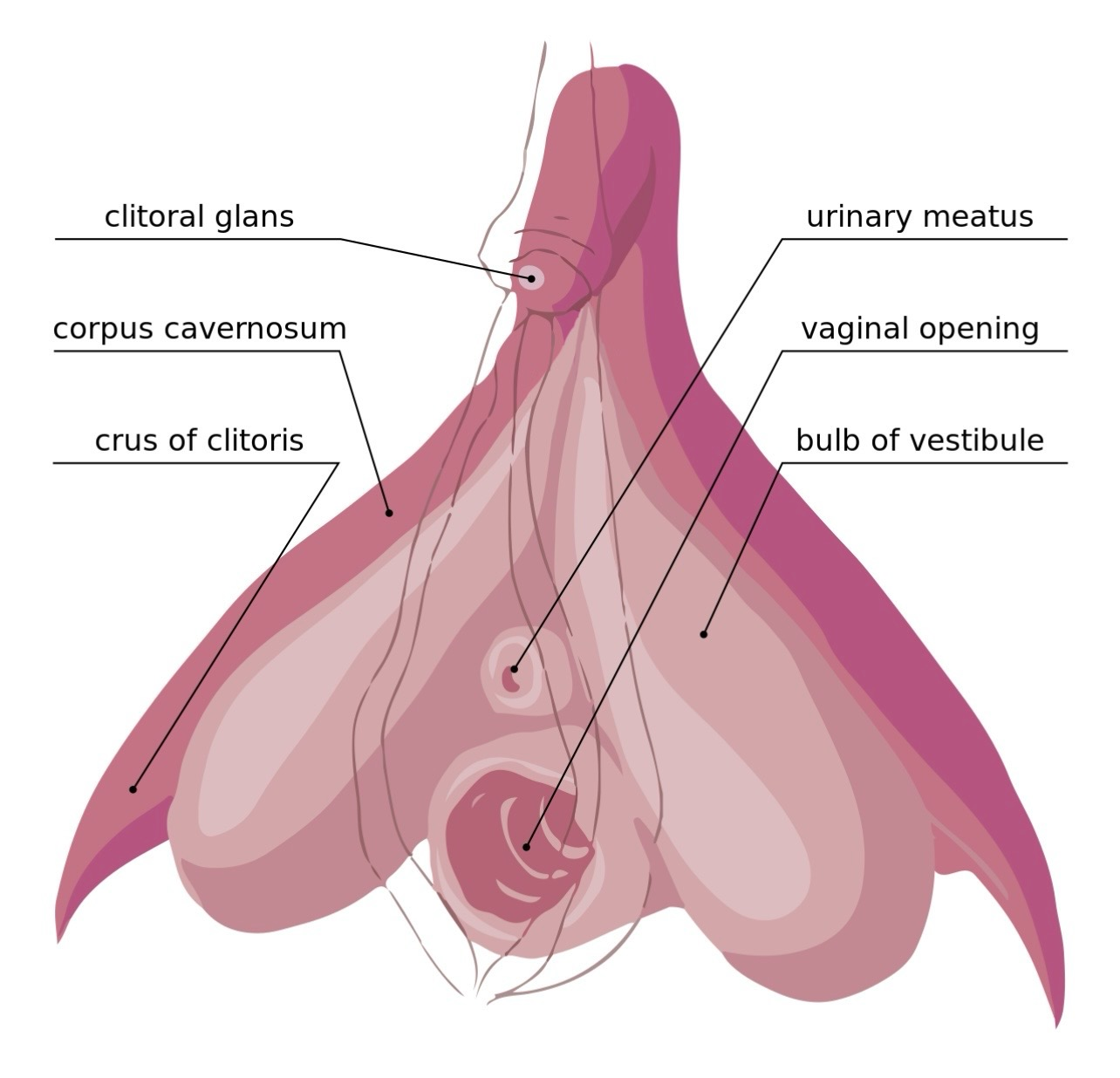
- The internal anatomy of the human vulva, with the clitoral hood and labia minora indicated as lines.

Details
- Part of: Clitoris
- System: Reproductive system
- Function: Clitoral erection

Identifiers
- Latin: corpus cavernosum clitoridis
- TA98: A09.2.02.005
- TA2: 3569
- FMA: 20172

The corpus cavernosum of the clitoris (corpus cavernosum clitoridis, pl.: corpora cavernosa clitoridum) is one of a pair of sponge-like regions of erectile tissue that engorge with blood during an erection. This is homologous to the corpus cavernosum of the penis. The term corpora cavernosa literally means 'cave-like bodies'.

== Structure ==
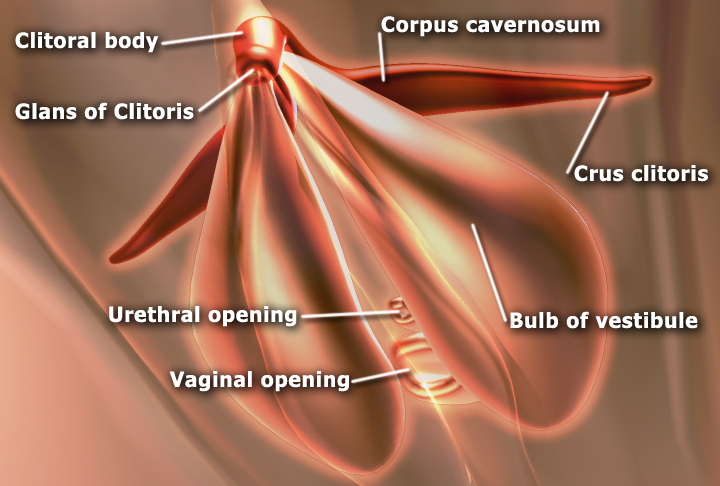
Shows the sub-areas of the clitoris. Areas include clitoral glans, body, crura. Also shows vestibular bulbs and corpora cavernosa

The two corpora cavernosa are expandable erectile tissues of the clitoris. They are joined together along their medial surfaces by an incomplete fibrous septum. Each corpus cavernosum is connected to the rami of the pubis and ischium by a clitoral crus. There is connection to the ischiocavernosus muscle. Each can be up to seven cm long in an adult.

=== Development ===
The corpus cavernosum is homologous to the corpus cavernosum penis in the male. It develops from the genital tubercle in the embryo.

The clitoris also has two vestibular bulbs beneath the skin of the labia minora (at the entrance to the vagina), which expand at the same time as the glans clitoridis to cap the ends of the corpora cavernosa.

=== Microanatomy ===
The corpus cavernosum is made of a sponge-like tissue. This contains irregular blood-filled spaces, lined by endothelium, and separated by connective tissue septa.

== Function ==
The corpora cavernosa fill with blood during arousal. Their size increases two to three fold. In some circumstances, release of nitric oxide precedes relaxation of the clitoral cavernosal artery and nearby muscle, in a process similar to male erection. More blood flows in through the clitoral cavernosal artery, the pressure in the corpora cavernosa clitoridis rises. The clitoris is engorged with blood. This leads to extrusion of the glans clitoridis and enhanced sensitivity to physical contact.

== Clinical significance ==
The corpora cavernosa can reduce in size before the menopause. This can impair sexual function in some women.
