= Clitoris =

Erectile female sexual organ

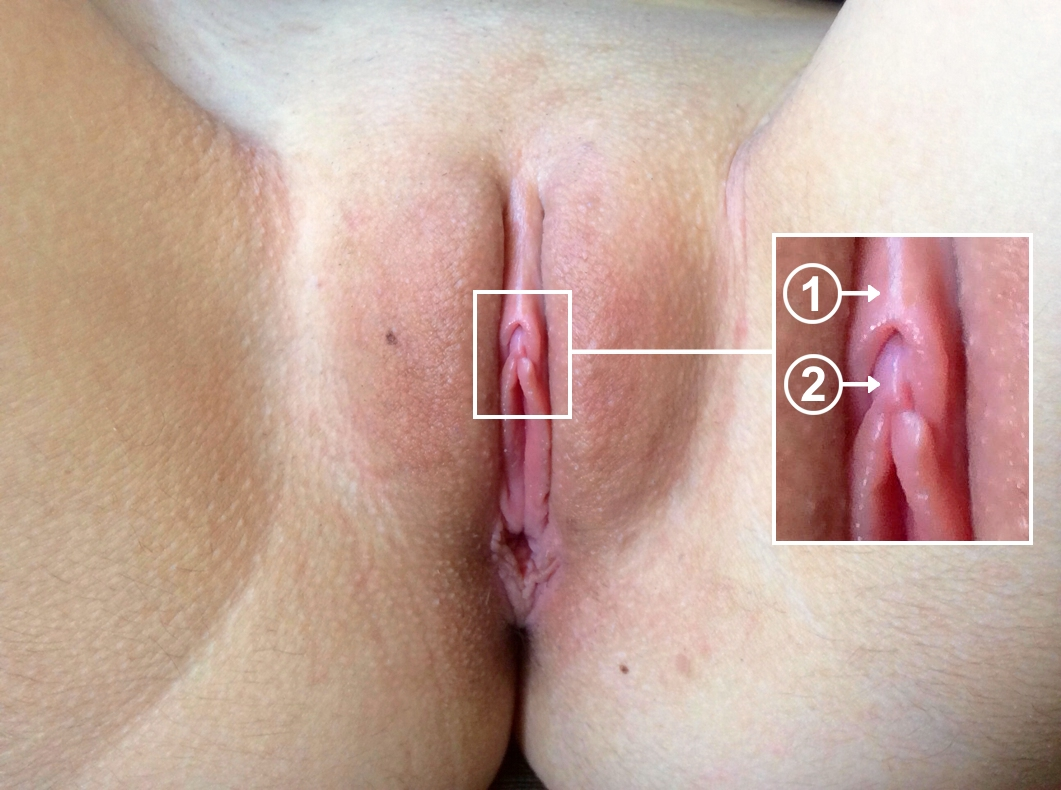
- Visible parts of the human clitoris: (1) clitoral hood and (2) clitoral glans. Pubic hair has been deliberately removed to show anatomical detail. The clitoral body extends beneath the glans.

Details
- Precursor: Genital tubercle
- Part of: Vulva
- Artery: Dorsal artery of clitoris, deep artery of clitoris, artery of bulb, internal pudendal artery
- Vein: Superficial dorsal veins of clitoris, deep dorsal vein of clitoris, vein of bulb, internal pudendal veins
- Nerve: Dorsal nerve of clitoris, pudendal nerve

Identifiers
- Latin: clitoris
- Greek: κλειτορίς
- MeSH: D002987
- TA98: A09.2.02.001
- TA2: 3565
- FMA: 9909

In amniotes, the clitoris (/ˈklɪtərɪs/ KLIT-ər-iss or /klɪˈtɔːrɪs/ klih-TOR-iss; pl.: clitorises or clitorides) is a female sex organ. In humans, it is the vulva's most erogenous area and generally the primary anatomical source of female sexual pleasure. The clitoris is a complex structure, and its size and sensitivity can vary. The visible portion, the glans, of the clitoris is typically roughly the size and shape of a pea and is estimated to have more than 10,000 nerve endings. Sometimes in common speech, clitoris or clit is used to solely reference the glans.

Sexological, medical, and psychological debate has focused on the clitoris, and it has been subject to social constructionist analyses and studies. Such discussions range from anatomical accuracy, gender inequality, female genital mutilation, and orgasmic factors and their physiological explanation for the G-spot. The only known purpose of the human clitoris is to provide sexual pleasure.

Knowledge of the clitoris is significantly affected by its cultural perceptions. Studies suggest that knowledge of its existence and anatomy is scant in comparison with that of other sexual organs (especially male sex organs) and that more education about it could help alleviate stigmas, such as the idea that the clitoris and vulva in general are visually unappealing or that female masturbation is taboo and disgraceful.

The clitoris is homologous to the majority of the penis in males.

== Etymology and terminology ==
The Oxford English Dictionary states that the Neo-Latin word clītoris likely has its origin in the Ancient Greek κλειτορίς (kleitorís), which means "little hill", and perhaps derived from the verb κλείειν (kleíein), meaning "to shut" or "to sheathe". Clitoris is also related to the Greek word κλείς (kleís), "key", "indicating that the ancient anatomists considered it the key" to female sexuality. In addition, the Online Etymology Dictionary suggests other Greek candidates for this word's etymology include a noun meaning "latch" or "hook" or a verb meaning "to touch or titillate lasciviously", "to tickle". The Oxford English Dictionary also states that the colloquially shortened form clit, the first occurrence of which was noted in the United States, has been used in print since 1958: until then, the common abbreviation was clitty. Other slang terms for clitoris are bean, nub, and love button. The term clitoris is commonly used to refer to the glans alone. In recent anatomical works, the clitoris has also been referred to as the bulbo-clitoral organ.

== Structure ==
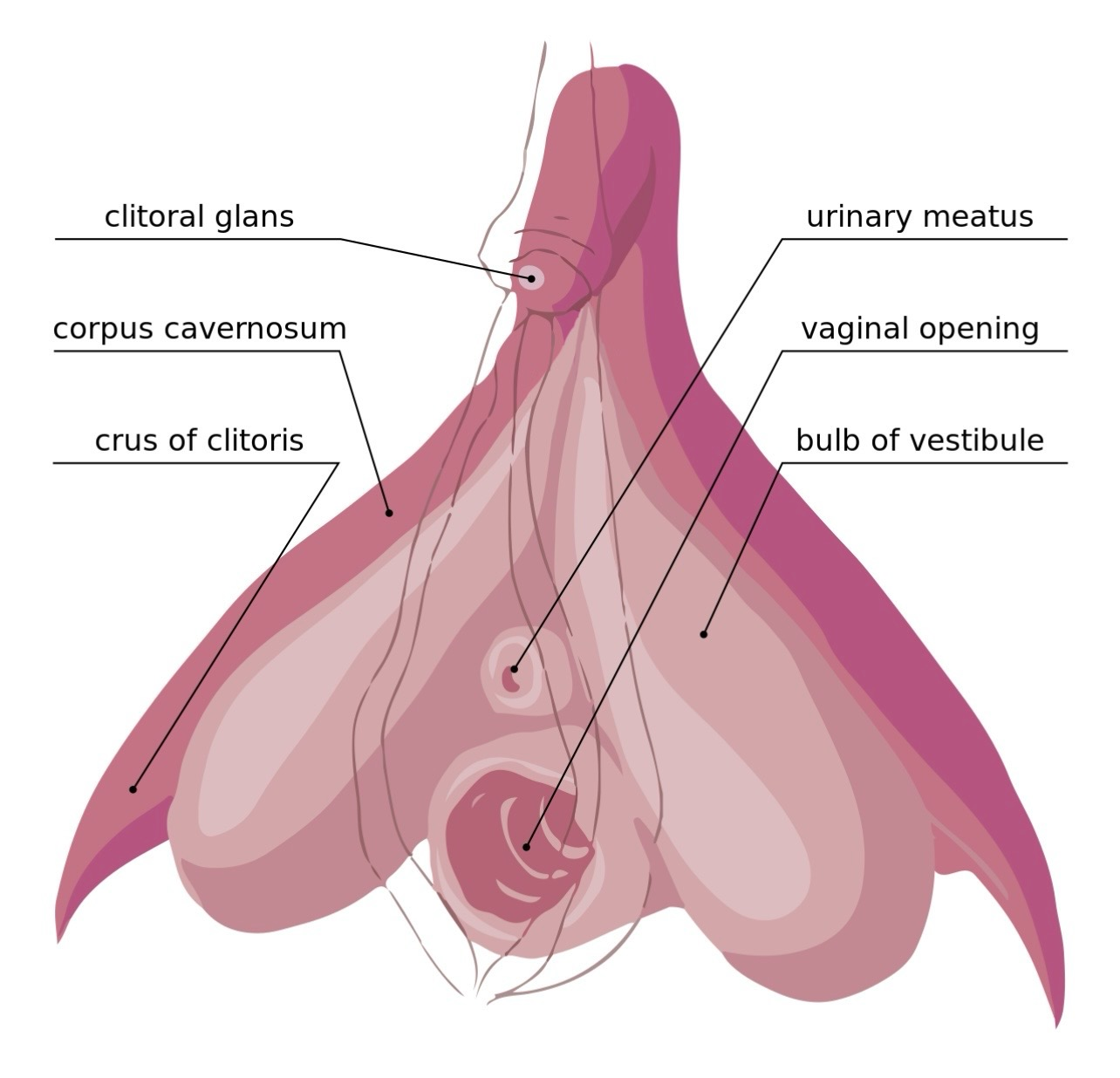
The internal anatomy of the clitoris, with the clitoral hood and labia minora indicated as lines.

Most of the clitoris is composed of internal parts. Regarding humans, it consists of the glans, the body (which is composed of two erectile structures known as the corpora cavernosa), the prepuce, and the root. The frenulum is beneath the glans.

Research indicates that clitoral tissue extends into the vaginal anterior wall. Şenaylı et al. said that the histological evaluation of the clitoris, "especially of the corpora cavernosa, is incomplete because for many years the clitoris was considered a rudimentary and nonfunctional organ". They added that Baskin and colleagues examined the clitoris' masculinization after dissection and using imaging software after Masson's trichrome staining, put the serial dissected specimens together; this revealed that nerves surround the whole clitoral body.

The clitoris, its bulbs, labia minora, and urethra involve two histologically distinct types of vascular tissue (tissue related to blood vessels), the first of which is trabeculated, erectile tissue innervated by the cavernous nerves. The trabeculated tissue has a spongy appearance; along with blood, it fills the large, dilated vascular spaces of the clitoris and the bulbs. Beneath the epithelium of the vascular areas is smooth muscle. As indicated by Yang et al.'s research, it may also be that the urethral lumen (the inner open space or cavity of the urethra), which is surrounded by a spongy tissue, has tissue that "is grossly distinct from the vascular tissue of the clitoris and bulbs, and on macroscopic observation, is paler than the dark tissue" of the clitoris and bulbs. The second type of vascular tissue is non-erectile, which may consist of blood vessels that are dispersed within a fibrous matrix and have only a minimal amount of smooth muscle.

=== Glans ===
Clitoral glans
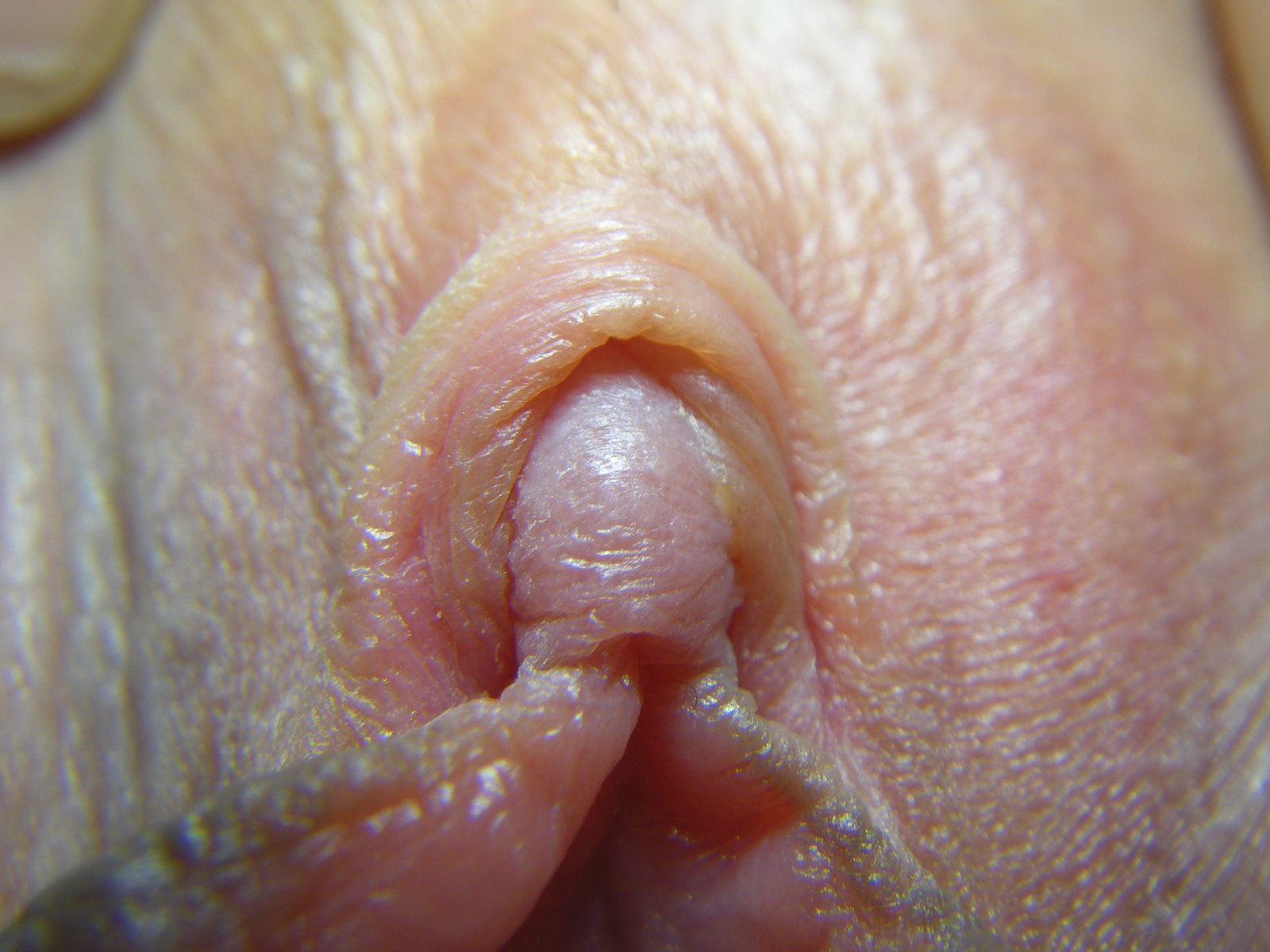
- A fully exposed human clitoral glans, shown below the hood

Details
- Precursor: Genital tubercle
- Artery: Dorsal arteries of clitoris
- Vein: Dorsal veins of clitoris
- Nerve: Dorsal nerve of clitoris

Identifiers
- Latin: glans clitoridis
- MeSH: D002987
- TA98: A09.2.02.001
- TA2: 3565
- FMA: 9909

Highly innervated, the clitoral glans (glans means "acorn" in Latin), also known as the "head" or "tip", exists at the anterior side of the clitoral body as a fibro-vascular cap and is usually the size and shape of a pea, although it is sometimes much larger or smaller. The glans is separated from the clitoral body by a ridge of tissue called the corona. The clitoral glans is estimated to have 8,000 and possibly 10,000 or more sensory nerve endings, making it the most sensitive erogenous zone. The glans also has numerous genital corpuscles. Research conflicts on whether the glans is composed of erectile or non-erectile tissue. Some sources describe the clitoral glans and labia minora as composed of non-erectile tissue; this is especially the case for the glans. They state that the clitoral glans and labia minora have blood vessels that are dispersed within a fibrous matrix and have only a minimal amount of smooth muscle, or that the clitoral glans is "a midline, densely neural, non-erectile structure". The clitoral glans is homologous to the male penile glans.

Other descriptions of the glans assert that it is composed of erectile tissue and that erectile tissue is present within the labia minora. The glans may be noted as having glandular vascular spaces that are not as prominent as those in the clitoral body, with the spaces being separated more by smooth muscle than in the body and crura. Adipose tissue is absent in the labia minora, but the organ may be described as being made up of dense connective tissue, erectile tissue and elastic fibers.

=== Frenulum ===
Clitoral frenulum
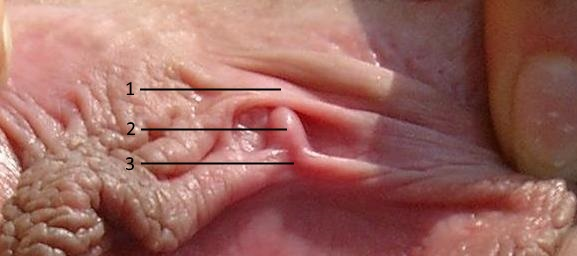
- Frenulum of the clitoris located at 3

Details

Identifiers
- Latin: frenulum clitoridis
- MeSH: D002987
- TA98: A09.2.02.001
- TA2: 3565
- FMA: 9909

The clitoral frenulum or frenum (frenulum clitoridis and crus glandis clitoridis in Latin; the former meaning "little bridle") is a medial band of tissue formed between the undersurface of the glans and the top ends of the labia minora. It is homologous to the penile frenulum in males. The frenulum's main function is to maintain the clitoris in its innate position.

=== Body ===
Body of the clitoris
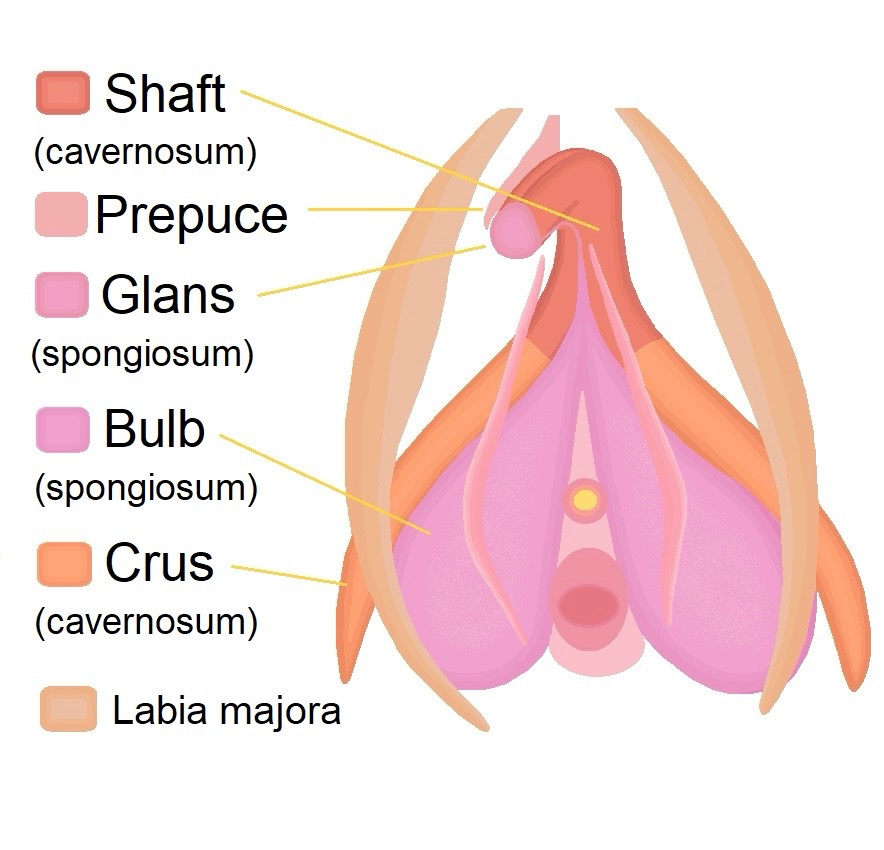
- Diagram of clitoris. Body (labeled as "shaft") at the top.

Details
- Precursor: Genital tubercle

Identifiers
- Latin: corpus clitoridis
- MeSH: D002987
- TA98: A09.2.02.001
- TA2: 3565
- FMA: 9909

The clitoral body (also known as the shaft of the clitoris) is a portion behind the glans that contains the union of the corpora cavernosa, a pair of sponge-like regions of erectile tissue that hold most of the blood in the clitoris during erection. It is homologous to the penile shaft in the male. The two corpora forming the clitoral body are surrounded by thick fibro-elastic tunica albuginea, a sheath of connective tissue. These corpora are separated incompletely from each other in the midline by a fibrous pectiniform septum – a comblike band of connective tissue extending between the corpora cavernosa. The clitoral body is also connected to the pubic symphysis by the suspensory ligament.

The body of the clitoris is a bent shape, which makes the clitoral angle or elbow. The angle divides the body into the ascending part (internal) near the pubic symphysis and the descending part (external), which can be seen and felt through the clitoral hood.

=== Root ===
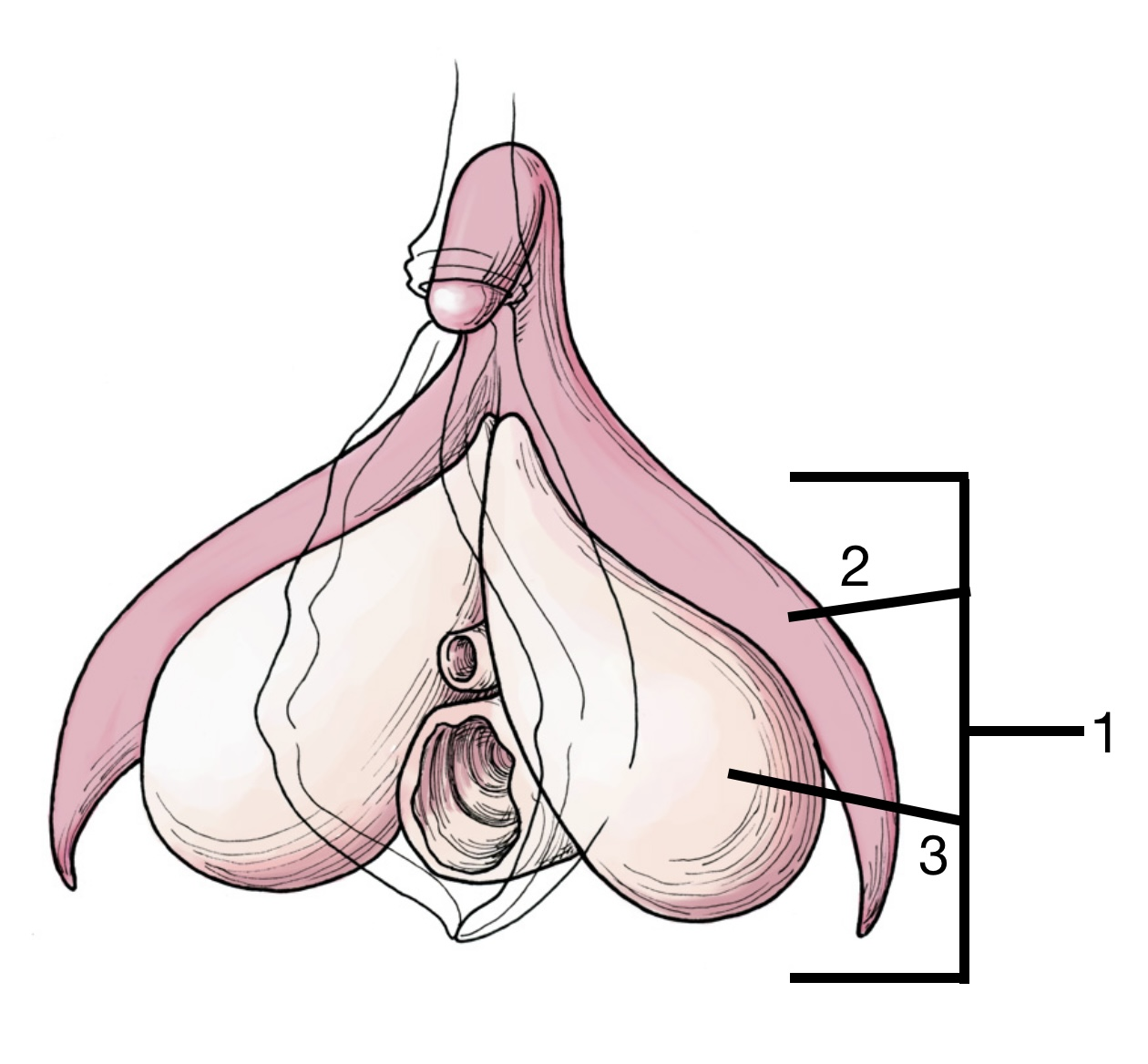
Root of the clitoris in 1; 2 crus, 3 bulb

Lying in the perineum (space between the vulva and anus) and within the superficial perineal pouch is the root of the clitoris, which consists of the posterior ends of the clitoris, the crura and the bulbs of vestibule.

The crura ("legs") are the parts of the corpora cavernosa extending from the clitoral body and form an upside-down "V" shape. Each crus (singular form of crura) is attached to the corresponding ischial ramus – extensions of the corpora beneath the descending pubic rami. Concealed behind the labia minora, the crura end with attachment at or just below the middle of the pubic arch. (Note: "The long, narrow crura arise from the inferior surface of the ischiopubic rami and fuse just below the middle of the pubic arch.") Associated are the urethral sponge, perineal sponge, a network of nerves and blood vessels, the suspensory ligament of the clitoris, muscles and the pelvic floor.

The vestibular bulbs are more closely related to the clitoris than the vestibule because of the similarity of the trabecular and erectile tissue within the clitoris and its bulbs, and the absence of trabecular tissue in other parts of the vulva, with the erectile tissue's trabecular nature allowing engorgement and expansion during sexual arousal. The vestibular bulbs are typically described as lying close to the crura on either side of the vaginal opening; internally, they are beneath the labia majora. The anterior sections of the bulbs unite to create the bulbar commissure, which forms a long strip of erectile tissue dubbed the infra-corporeal residual spongy part (RSP) that expands from the ventral shaft and terminates as the glans. The RSP is also connected to the shaft via the pars intermedia (venous plexus of Kobelt). When engorged with blood, the bulbs cuff the vaginal opening and cause the vulva to expand outward. Although several texts state that they surround the vaginal opening, Ginger et al. state that this does not appear to be the case and tunica albuginea does not envelop the erectile tissue of the bulbs. In Yang et al.'s assessment of the bulbs' anatomy, they conclude that the bulbs "arch over the distal urethra, outlining what might be appropriately called the 'bulbar urethra' in women".

=== Hood ===
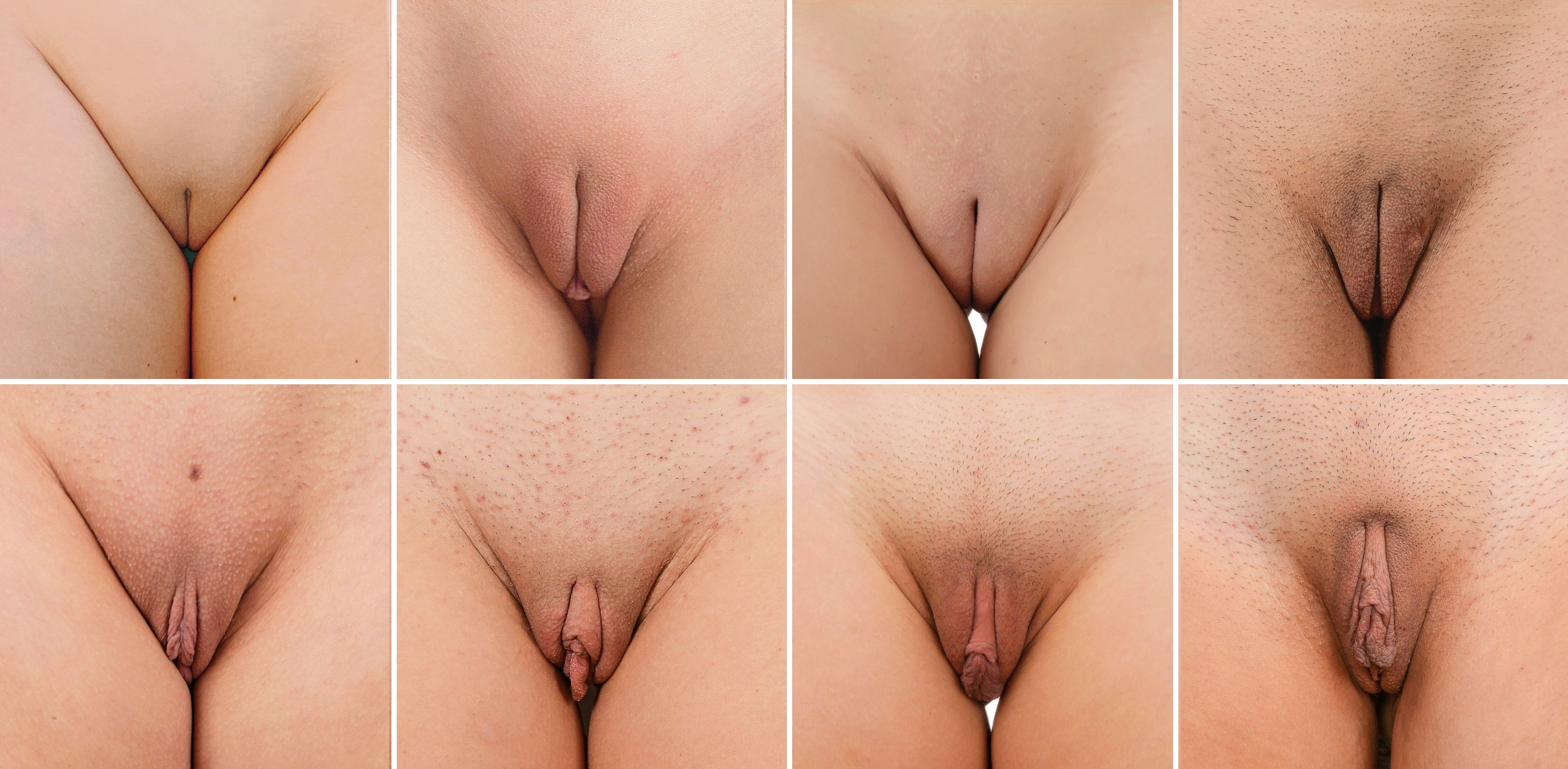
The clitoral hood has a normal anatomical variation in size and appearance in different women: For some, it is completely covered by the labia majora and hidden within the vulvar cleft when standing with their legs closed (top row), while in others, it is pronounced and visible (bottom row).

The clitoral hood or prepuce projects at the front of the labia commissure, where the edges of the labia majora meet at the base of the pubic mound. It is partially formed by fusion of the upper labia minora. The hood's function is to cover and protect the glans and external shaft. There is considerable variation in how much of the glans protrudes from the hood and how much is covered by it, ranging from completely covered to fully exposed, and tissue of the labia minora also encircles the base of the glans.

=== Size and length ===
There is no identified correlation between the size of the glans or clitoris as a whole, and a woman's age, height, weight, use of hormonal contraception, or being postmenopausal, although women who have given birth may have significantly larger clitoral measurements. Centimetre and millimetre measurements of the clitoris show variations in size. The clitoral glans has been cited as typically varying from 2 mm to 1 cm (less than an inch) and usually being estimated at 4 to 5 mm in both the transverse and longitudinal planes.

A 1992 study concluded that the total clitoral length, including glans and body, is 16.0 ± 4.3 mm (0.63 ± 0.17 in), where 16 mm (0.63 in) is the mean and 4.3 mm (0.17 in) is the standard deviation. Concerning other studies, researchers from the Elizabeth Garrett Anderson and Obstetric Hospital in London measured the labia and other genital structures of 50 women from the age of 18 to 50, with a mean age of 35.6., from 2003 to 2004, and the results given for the clitoral glans were 3–10 mm for the range and 5.5 [1.7] mm for the mean. Other research indicates that the clitoral body can measure 5–7 centimetres (2.0–2.8 in) in length, while the clitoral body and crura together can be 10 centimetres (3.9 in) or more in length.

== Development ==
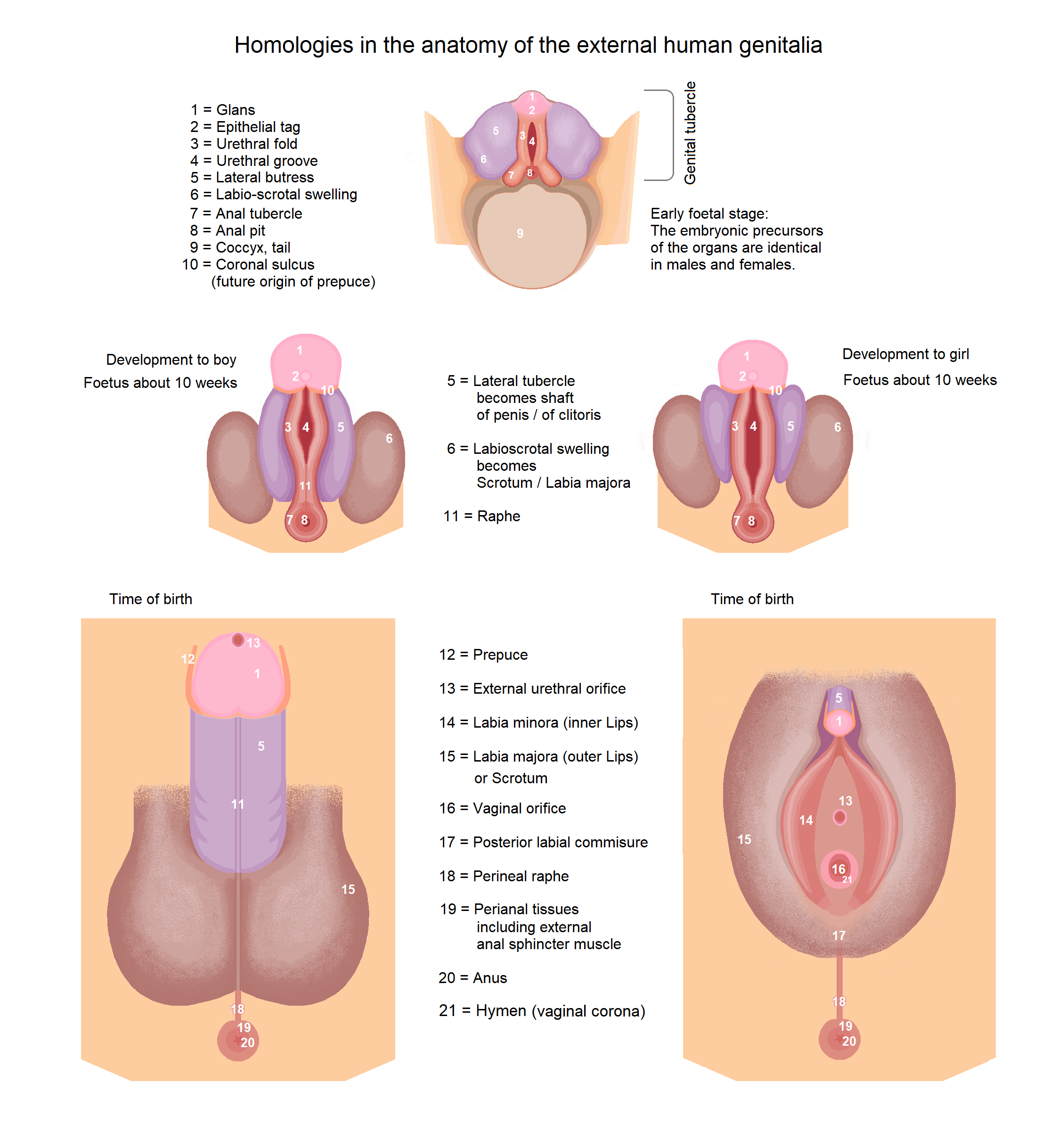
Development of external genitals showing homologues from indifferent to both sexes - female on right

The clitoris develops from a phallic outgrowth in the embryo called the genital tubercle. In the absence of testosterone, the genital tubercle allows for the formation of the clitoris; the initially rapid growth of the phallus gradually slows and the body and glans of the clitoris are formed along with its other structures.

== Function ==
=== Sexual stimulation and arousal ===
The clitoris has an abundance of nerve endings, and is the human female's most erogenous part of the body. When sexually stimulated, it may incite sexual arousal, which may result from mental stimulation (sexual fantasy), activity with a sexual partner, or masturbation, and can lead to orgasm. The most effective sexual stimulation of this organ is usually manually or orally, which is often referred to as direct clitoral stimulation; in cases involving sexual penetration, these activities may also be referred to as additional or assisted clitoral stimulation.

Direct stimulation involves physical stimulation to the external anatomy of the clitoris – glans, hood, and shaft. Stimulation of the labia minora, due to it being connected with the glans and hood, may have the same effect as direct clitoral stimulation. Though these areas may also receive indirect physical stimulation during sexual activity, such as when in friction with the labia majora, indirect clitoral stimulation is more commonly attributed to penile-vaginal penetration. Penile-anal penetration may also indirectly stimulate the clitoris by the shared sensory nerves (especially the pudendal nerve, which gives off the inferior anal nerves and divides into two terminal branches: the perineal nerve and the dorsal nerve of the clitoris).

Due to the glans' high sensitivity, direct stimulation to it is not always pleasurable; instead, direct stimulation to the hood or near the glans is often more pleasurable, with the majority of women preferring to use the hood to stimulate the glans, or to have the glans rolled between the labia, for indirect touch. It is also common for women to enjoy the shaft being softly caressed in concert with the occasional circling of the glans. This might be with or without digital penetration of the vagina, while other women enjoy having the entire vulva caressed. As opposed to the use of dry fingers, stimulation from well-lubricated fingers, either by vaginal lubrication or a personal lubricant, is usually more pleasurable for the external clitoris.

As the clitoris' external location does not allow for direct stimulation by penetration, any external clitoral stimulation while in the missionary position usually results from the pubic bone area. As such, some couples may engage in the woman-on-top position or the coital alignment technique, a sex position combining the "riding high" variation of the missionary position with pressure-counterpressure movements performed by each partner in rhythm with sexual penetration, to maximize clitoral stimulation. Same-sex female couples may engage in tribadism (vulva-to-vulva or vulva-to-body rubbing) for ample or mutual clitoral stimulation during whole-body contact. (Note: "A common variation is 'tribadism,' where two women lie face to face, one on top of the other. The genitals are pressed tightly together while the partners move in a grinding motion. Some rub their clitoris against their partner's pubic bone.") Pressing the penis in a gliding or circular motion against the clitoris or stimulating it by the movement against another body part may also be practiced. A vibrator (such as a clitoral vibrator), dildo or other sex toy may be used. Other women stimulate the clitoris by use of a pillow or other inanimate object, by a jet of water from the faucet of a bathtub or shower, or by closing their legs and rocking.

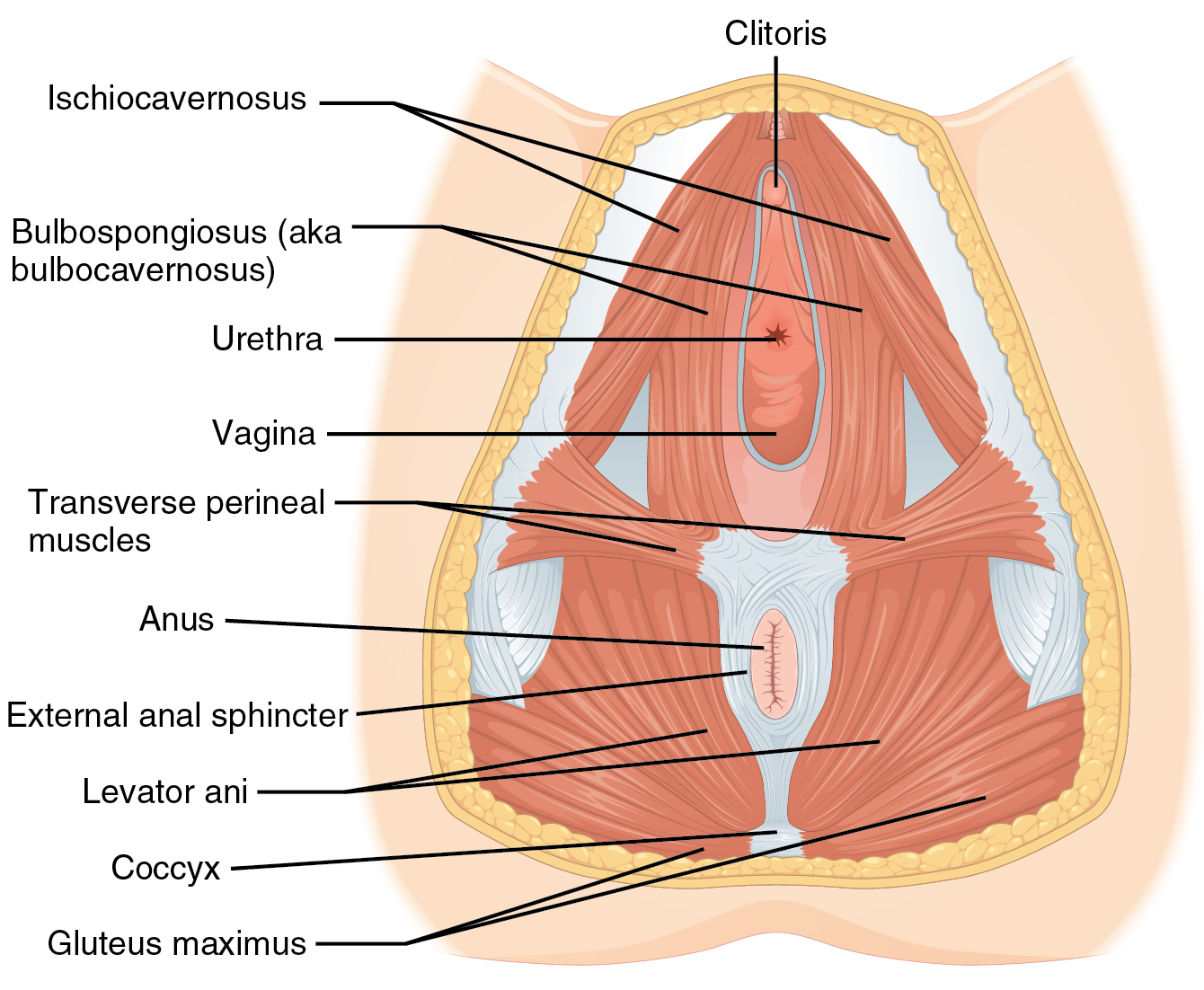
Muscles underlying the clitoris and perineum

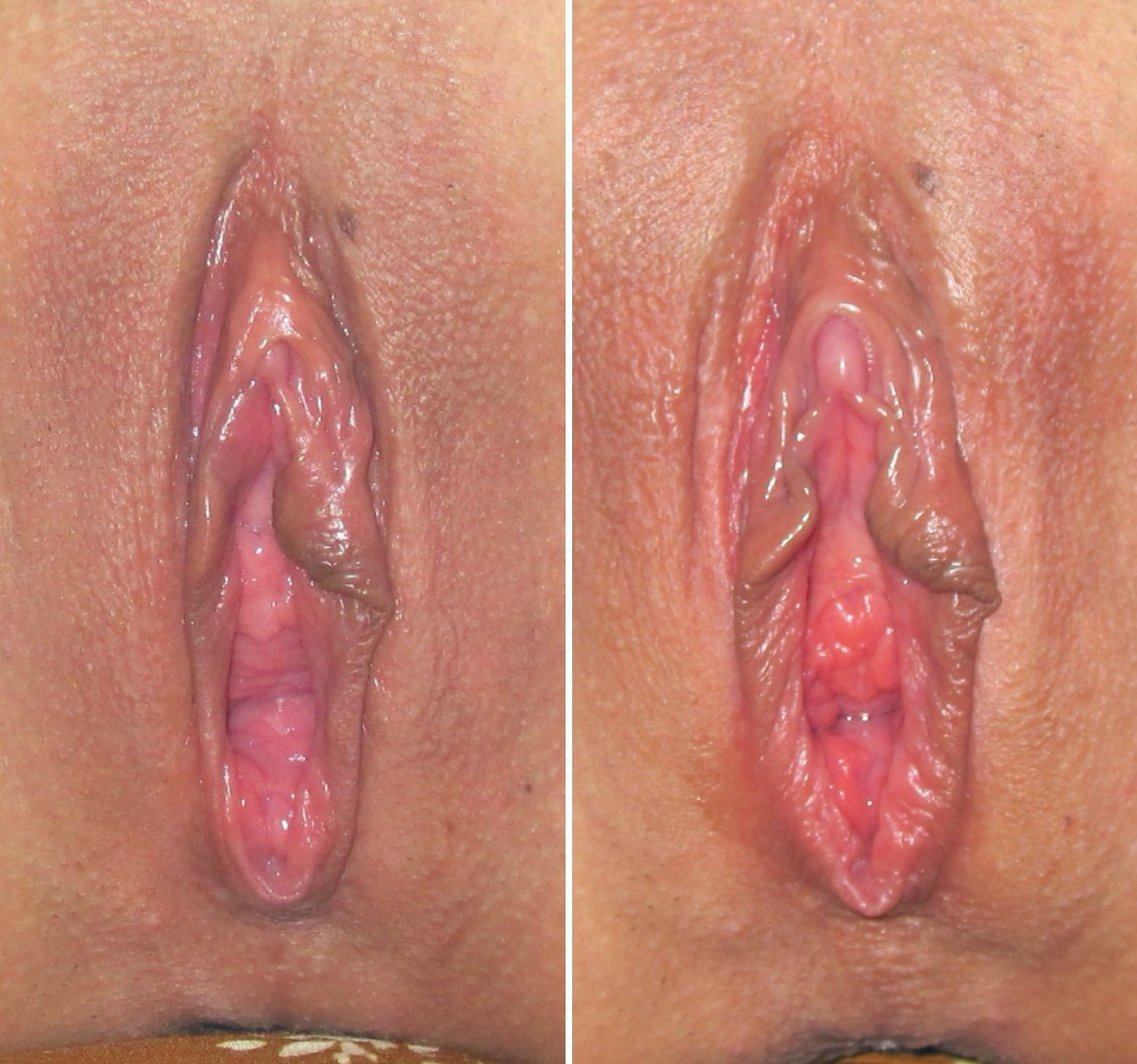
A flaccid (left) and erect clitoris (right)

During sexual arousal, the clitoris and the rest of the vulva engorge and change color as the erectile tissues fill with blood (vasocongestion), and the individual experiences vaginal contractions. The ischiocavernosus and bulbocavernosus muscles, which insert into the corpora cavernosa, contract and compress the dorsal vein of the clitoris (the only vein that drains the blood from the spaces in the corpora cavernosa), and the arterial blood continues a steady flow and having no way to drain out, fills the venous spaces until they become turgid and engorged with blood. This is what leads to clitoral erection.

The prepuce has retracted and the glans becomes more visible. The glans doubles in diameter upon arousal and further stimulation becomes less visible as it is covered by the swelling of the clitoral hood. The swelling protects the glans from direct contact, as direct contact at this stage can be more irritating than pleasurable. Vasocongestion eventually triggers a muscular reflex, which expels the blood that was trapped in surrounding tissues, and leads to an orgasm. A short time after stimulation has stopped, especially if orgasm has been achieved, the glans becomes visible again and returns to its normal state, with a few seconds (usually 5–10) to return to its normal position and 5–10 minutes to return to its original size. (Note: "Within a few seconds the clitoris returns to its normal position, and after 5–10 minutes shrinks to its normal size.") If orgasm is not achieved, the clitoris may remain engorged for a few hours, which women often find uncomfortable. Additionally, the clitoris is very sensitive after orgasm, making further stimulation initially painful for some women.

==== Clitoral and vaginal orgasmic factors ====
General statistics indicate that 70–80 percent of women require direct clitoral stimulation (consistent manual, oral, or other concentrated friction against the external parts of the clitoris) to reach orgasm. (Note: "Most women report the inability to achieve orgasm with vaginal intercourse and require direct clitoral stimulation ... About 20% have coital climaxes ...") (Note: "Women rated clitoral stimulation as at least somewhat more important than vaginal stimulation in achieving orgasm; only about 20% indicated that they did not require additional clitoral stimulation during intercourse.") (Note: "a. The amount of time of sexual arousal needed to reach orgasm is variable – and usually much longer – in women than in men; thus, only 20–30% of women attain a coital climax. b. Many women (70–80%) require manual clitoral stimulation ...") Indirect clitoral stimulation (for example, by means of vaginal penetration) may also be sufficient for female orgasm. (Note: "In sum, it seems that approximately 25% of women always have orgasm with intercourse, while a narrow majority of women have orgasm with intercourse more than half the time ... According to the general statistics, cited in Chapter 2, [women who can consistently and easily have orgasms during unassisted intercourse] represent perhaps 20% of the adult female population, and thus cannot be considered representative.") The area near the entrance of the vagina (the lower third) contains nearly 90 percent of the vaginal nerve endings, and there are areas in the anterior vaginal wall and between the top junction of the labia minora and the urinary meatus that are especially sensitive, but intense sexual pleasure, including orgasm, solely from vaginal stimulation is occasional or otherwise absent because the vagina has significantly fewer nerve endings than the clitoris.

The prominent debate over the quantity of vaginal nerve endings began with Alfred Kinsey. Although Sigmund Freud's theory that clitoral orgasms are a prepubertal or adolescent phenomenon and that vaginal (or G-spot) orgasms are something that only physically mature females experience had been criticized before, Kinsey was the first researcher to harshly criticize the theory. Through his observations of female masturbation and interviews with thousands of women, Kinsey found that most of the women he observed and surveyed could not have vaginal orgasms, a finding that was also supported by his knowledge of sex organ anatomy. Scholar Janice M. Irvine stated that he "criticized Freud and other theorists for projecting male constructs of sexuality onto women" and "viewed the clitoris as the main center of sexual response". He considered the vagina to be "relatively unimportant" for sexual satisfaction, relaying that "few women inserted fingers or objects into their vaginas when they masturbated". Believing that vaginal orgasms are "a physiological impossibility" because the vagina has insufficient nerve endings for sexual pleasure or climax, he "concluded that satisfaction from penile penetration [is] mainly psychological or perhaps the result of referred sensation".

Masters and Johnson's research, as well as Shere Hite's, generally supported Kinsey's findings about the female orgasm. Masters and Johnson were the first researchers to determine that the clitoral structures surround and extend along and within the labia. They observed that both clitoral and vaginal orgasms have the same stages of physical response, and found that the majority of their subjects could only achieve clitoral orgasms, while a minority achieved vaginal orgasms. On that basis, they argued that clitoral stimulation is the source of both kinds of orgasms, reasoning that the clitoris is stimulated during penetration by friction against its hood. The research came at the time of the second-wave feminist movement, which inspired feminists to reject the distinction made between clitoral and vaginal orgasms. Feminist Anne Koedt argued that because men "have orgasms essentially by friction with the vagina" and not the clitoral area, this is why women's biology had not been properly analyzed. "Today, with extensive knowledge of anatomy, with [C. Lombard Kelly], Kinsey, and Masters and Johnson, to mention just a few sources, there is no ignorance on the subject [of the female orgasm]", she stated in her 1970 article The Myth of the Vaginal Orgasm. She added, "There are, however, social reasons why this knowledge has not been popularized. We are living in a male society which has not sought change in women's role".

Supporting an anatomical relationship between the clitoris and vagina is a study published in 2005, which investigated the size of the clitoris; Australian urologist Helen O'Connell, described as having initiated discourse among mainstream medical professionals to refocus on and redefine the clitoris, noted a direct relationship between the legs or roots of the clitoris and the erectile tissue of the bulbs and corpora, and the distal urethra and vagina while using magnetic resonance imaging (MRI) technology. While some studies, using ultrasound, have found physiological evidence of the G-spot in women who report having orgasms during vaginal intercourse, O'Connell argues that this interconnected relationship is the physiological explanation for the conjectured G-spot and experience of vaginal orgasms, taking into account the stimulation of the internal parts of the clitoris during vaginal penetration. "The vaginal wall is, in fact, the clitoris", she said. "If you lift the skin off the vagina on the side walls, you get the bulbs of the clitoris – triangular, crescental masses of erectile tissue". O'Connell et al., having performed dissections on the vulvas of cadavers and used photography to map the structure of nerves in the clitoris, made the assertion in 1998 that there is more erectile tissue associated with the clitoris than is generally described in anatomical textbooks and were thus already aware that the clitoris is more than just its glans. They concluded that some females have more extensive clitoral tissues and nerves than others, especially having observed this in young cadavers compared to elderly ones, and therefore whereas the majority of females can only achieve orgasm by direct stimulation of the external parts of the clitoris, the stimulation of the more generalized tissues of the clitoris via vaginal intercourse may be sufficient for others.

French researchers Odile Buisson and Pierre Foldès reported similar findings to that of O'Connell's. In 2008, they published the first complete 3D sonography of the stimulated clitoris and republished it in 2009 with new research, demonstrating how erectile tissue of the clitoris engorges and surrounds the vagina. Based on their findings, they argued that women may be able to achieve vaginal orgasm through stimulation of the G-spot because the clitoris is pulled closely to the anterior wall of the vagina when the woman is sexually aroused and during vaginal penetration. They assert that since the front wall of the vagina is inextricably linked with the internal parts of the clitoris, stimulating the vagina without activating the clitoris may be next to impossible. In their 2009 published study, it states the "coronal planes during perineal contraction and finger penetration demonstrated a close relationship between the root of the clitoris and the anterior vaginal wall". Buisson and Foldès suggested "that the special sensitivity of the lower anterior vaginal wall could be explained by pressure and movement of clitoris' root during a vaginal penetration and subsequent perineal contraction".

Researcher Vincenzo Puppo, who, while agreeing that the clitoris is the center of female sexual pleasure and believing that there is no anatomical evidence of the vaginal orgasm, disagrees with O'Connell and other researchers' terminological and anatomical descriptions of the clitoris (such as referring to the vestibular bulbs as the "clitoral bulbs") and states that "the inner clitoris" does not exist because the penis cannot come in contact with the congregation of multiple nerves/veins situated until the angle of the clitoris, detailed by Georg Ludwig Kobelt, or with the root of the clitoris, which does not have sensory receptors or erogenous sensitivity, during vaginal intercourse. Puppo's belief contrasts the general belief among researchers that vaginal orgasms are the result of clitoral stimulation; they reaffirm that clitoral tissue extends, or is at least stimulated by its bulbs, even in the area most commonly reported to be the G-spot.

The G-spot is analogous to the base of the penis and has additionally been theorized, with the sentiment from researcher Amichai Kilchevsky that because female fetal development is the "default" state in the absence of substantial exposure to male hormones and therefore the penis is essentially a clitoris enlarged by such hormones, there is no evolutionary reason why females would have an entity in addition to the clitoris that can produce orgasms. The general difficulty of achieving orgasms vaginally, which is a predicament that is likely due to nature easing the process of childbearing by drastically reducing the number of vaginal nerve endings, challenge arguments that vaginal orgasms help encourage sexual intercourse to facilitate reproduction. Supporting a distinct G-spot, however, is a study by Rutgers University, published in 2011, which was the first to map the female genitals onto the sensory portion of the brain; the scans indicated that the brain registered distinct feelings between stimulating the clitoris, the cervix and the vaginal wall – where the G-spot is reported to be – when several women stimulated themselves in a functional magnetic resonance machine. Barry Komisaruk, head of the research findings, stated that he feels that "the bulk of the evidence shows that the G-spot is not a particular thing" and that it is "a region, it's a convergence of many different structures".

=== Vestigiality, adaptionist and reproductive views ===
Whether the clitoris is vestigial, an adaptation, or serves a reproductive function has been debated. Geoffrey Miller stated that Helen Fisher, Meredith Small and Sarah Blaffer Hrdy "have viewed the clitoral orgasm as a legitimate adaptation in its own right, with major implications for female sexual behavior and sexual evolution". Like Lynn Margulis and Natalie Angier, Miller believes, "The human clitoris shows no apparent signs of having evolved directly through male mate choice. It is not especially large, brightly colored, specifically shaped or selectively displayed during courtship". He contrasts this with other female species that have clitorises as long as their male counterparts. He said the human clitoris "could have evolved to be much more conspicuous if males had preferred sexual partners with larger brighter clitorises" and that "its inconspicuous design combined with its exquisite sensitivity suggests that the clitoris is important not as an object of male mate choice, but as a mechanism of female choice".

While Miller stated that male scientists such as Stephen Jay Gould and Donald Symons "have viewed the female clitoral orgasm as an evolutionary side-effect of the male capacity for penile orgasm" and that they "suggested that clitoral orgasm cannot be an adaptation because it is too hard to achieve", Gould acknowledged that "most female orgasms emanate from a clitoral, rather than vaginal (or some other), site" and that his nonadaptive belief "has been widely misunderstood as a denial of either the adaptive value of female orgasm in general or even as a claim that female orgasms lack significance in some broader sense". He said that although he accepts that "clitoral orgasm plays a pleasurable and central role in female sexuality and its joys", "[a]ll these favorable attributes, however, emerge just as clearly and just as easily, whether the clitoral site of orgasm arose as a spandrel or an adaptation". He added that the "male biologists who fretted over [the adaptionist questions] simply assumed that a deeply vaginal site, nearer the region of fertilization, would offer greater selective benefit" due to their Darwinian, summum bonum beliefs about enhanced reproductive success.

Similar to Gould's beliefs about adaptionist views and that "females grow nipples as adaptations for suckling, and males grow smaller unused nipples as a spandrel based upon the value of single development channels", American philosopher Elisabeth Lloyd suggested that there is little evidence to support an adaptionist account of female orgasm. Canadian sexologist Meredith L. Chivers stated that "Lloyd views female orgasm as an ontogenetic leftover; women have orgasms because the urogenital neurophysiology for orgasm is so strongly selected for in males that this developmental blueprint gets expressed in females without affecting fitness" and this is similar to "males hav[ing] nipples that serve no fitness-related function".

At the 2002 conference for Canadian Society of Women in Philosophy, Nancy Tuana argued that the clitoris is unnecessary in reproduction; she stated that it has been ignored because of "a fear of pleasure. It is pleasure separated from reproduction. That's the fear". She reasoned that this fear causes ignorance, which veils female sexuality. O'Connell stated, "It boils down to rivalry between the sexes: the idea that one sex is sexual and the other reproductive. The truth is that both are sexual and both are reproductive". She reiterated that the vestibular bulbs appear to be part of the clitoris and that the distal urethra and vagina are intimately related structures, although they are not erectile in character, forming a tissue cluster with the clitoris that appears to be the location of female sexual function and orgasm.

== Clinical significance ==
=== Modification ===
Genital modification may be for aesthetic, medical or cultural reasons. This includes female genital mutilation (FGM), sex reassignment surgery (for trans men as part of transitioning), intersex surgery, and genital piercings. Use of anabolic steroids by bodybuilders and other athletes can result in significant enlargement of the clitoris along with other masculinizing effects on their bodies. Abnormal enlargement of the clitoris may be referred to as clitoromegaly or macroclitoris, but clitoromegaly is more commonly seen as a congenital anomaly of the genitalia.

Clitoroplasty, a sex reassignment surgery for trans women, involves the construction of a clitoris from penile tissue. It is usually done alongside other feminizing surgeries, such as vaginoplasty.

People taking male hormones or other medications as part of a gender transition usually experience dramatic clitoral growth; individual desires and the difficulties of phalloplasty (construction of a penis) often result in the retention of the original genitalia with the enlarged clitoris as a penis analog (metoidioplasty). However, the clitoris cannot reach the size of the penis through hormones. A surgery to add function to the clitoris, such as metoidioplasty, is an alternative to phalloplasty that permits the retention of sexual sensation in the clitoris.

In clitoridectomy, the clitoris may be removed as part of a radical vulvectomy to treat cancer such as vulvar intraepithelial neoplasia; however, modern treatments favor more conservative approaches, as invasive surgery can have psychosexual consequences. Clitoridectomy more often involves parts of the clitoris being partially or completely removed during FGM, which may be additionally known as female circumcision or female genital cutting (FGC). Removing the glans does not mean that the whole structure is lost, since the clitoris reaches deep into the genitals.

In reduction clitoroplasty, a common intersex surgery, the glans is preserved and parts of the erectile bodies are excised. Problems with this technique include loss of sensation, loss of sexual function, and sloughing of the glans. One way to preserve the clitoris with its innervations and function is to imbricate and bury the glans; however, Şenaylı et al. state that "pain during stimulus because of trapped tissue under the scarring is nearly routine. In another method, 50 percent of the ventral clitoris is removed through the level base of the clitoral shaft, and it is reported that good sensation and clitoral function are observed in follow-up"; additionally, it has "been reported that the complications are from the same as those in the older procedures for this method".

Concerning females who have the condition congenital adrenal hyperplasia, the largest group requiring surgical genital correction, researcher Atilla Şenaylı stated, "The main expectations for the operations are to create a normal female anatomy, with minimal complications and improvement of life quality". Şenaylı added that "[c]osmesis, structural integrity, the coital capacity of the vagina, and absence of pain during sexual activity are the parameters to be judged by the surgeon". (Cosmesis usually refers to the surgical correction of a disfiguring defect.) He stated that although "expectations can be standardized within these few parameters, operative techniques have not yet become homogeneous. Investigators have preferred different operations for different ages of patients".

Gender assessment and surgical treatment are the two main steps in intersex operations. "The first treatments for clitoromegaly were simply resection of the clitoris. Later, it was understood that the clitoris glans and sensory input are important to facilitate orgasm", stated Atilla. The clitoral glans' epithelium "has high cutaneous sensitivity, which is important in sexual responses", and it is because of this that "recession clitoroplasty was later devised as an alternative, but reduction clitoroplasty is the method currently performed".

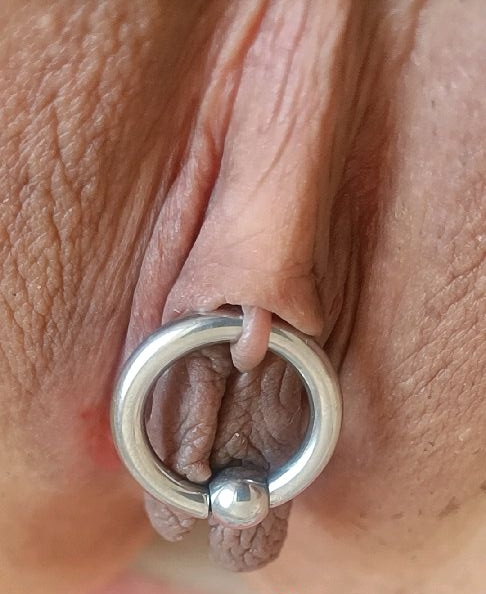
Glans clitoridis piercing

Various types of genital piercings can be inserted in the clitoris area. The clitoris piercing passes through the clitoral glans proper. However, performing this piercing depends heavily on anatomy and only a small percentage of people are anatomically suited for it (i.e., a sufficiently developed glans clitoridis is needed). The term "clit piercing" therefore often refers to the more common clitoral hood piercing. These are usually channeled in the form of vertical piercings, and, to a lesser extent, horizontal piercings. The triangle piercing is a very deep horizontal hood piercing and is done behind the clitoris as opposed to in front of it. For styles such as the Isabella piercing, which passes through the clitoral shaft but is placed deep at the base, they provide unique stimulation and still require the proper genital build. The Isabella starts between the clitoral glans and the urethra, exiting at the top of the clitoral hood; this piercing is highly risky concerning the damage that may occur because of intersecting nerves. (See Clitoral index.)

=== Sexual disorders ===
Persistent genital arousal disorder (PGAD) results in spontaneous, persistent, and uncontrollable genital arousal in women, unrelated to any feelings of sexual desire. Clitoral priapism is a rare, potentially painful medical condition and is sometimes described as an aspect of PGAD. With PGAD, arousal lasts for an unusually extended period (ranging from hours to days); it can also be associated with morphometric and vascular modifications of the clitoris.

Drugs may cause or affect clitoral priapism. The drug trazodone is known to cause male priapism as a side effect, but there is only one documented report that it may have caused clitoral priapism, in which case discontinuing the medication may be a remedy. Additionally, nefazodone is documented to have caused clitoral engorgement, as distinct from clitoral priapism, in one case, and clitoral priapism can sometimes start as a result of, or only after, the discontinuation of antipsychotics or selective serotonin reuptake inhibitors (SSRIs).

Because PGAD is relatively rare and, as its concept apart from clitoral priapism, has only been researched since 2001, there is little research into what may cure or remedy the disorder. In some recorded cases, PGAD was caused by or caused, a pelvic arterial-venous malformation with arterial branches to the clitoris; surgical treatment was effective in these cases.

In 2022, an article in The New York Times reported several instances of women experiencing reduced clitoral sensitivity or inability to orgasm following various surgical procedures, including biopsies of the vulva, pelvic mesh surgeries (sling surgeries), and labiaplasties. The Times quoted several researchers who suggest that surgeons' lack of training in clitoral anatomy and nerve distribution may have been a factor.

As it is part of the vulva, the clitoris is susceptible to pain (clitorodynia) from various conditions such as sexually transmitted infections and pudendal nerve entrapment. The clitoris may also be affected by vulvar cancer, although at a much lower rate.

Clitoral phimosis (or clitoral adhesions) is when the prepuce cannot be retracted, limiting exposure of the glans.

=== Smegma ===
The secretion of smegma (smegma clitoridis) comes from the apocrine glands of the clitoris (sweat), the sebaceous glands of the clitoris (sebum) and desquamating epithelial cells.

== Society and culture ==
=== Ancient Greek–16th century knowledge and vernacular ===
Concerning historical and modern perceptions of the clitoris, the clitoris and the penis were considered equivalent by some scholars for more than 2,500 years in all respects except their arrangement. Due to it being frequently omitted from, or misrepresented in, historical and contemporary anatomical texts, it was also subject to a continual cycle of male scholars claiming to have discovered it. The ancient Greeks, ancient Romans, and Greek and Roman generations up to and throughout the Renaissance, were aware that male and female sex organs are anatomically similar, but prominent anatomists such as Galen and Vesalius regarded the vagina as the structural equivalent of the penis, except for being inverted; Vesalius argued against the existence of the clitoris in normal women, and his anatomical model described how the penis corresponds with the vagina, without a role for the clitoris.

Ancient Greek and Roman sexuality additionally designated penetration as "male-defined" sexuality. The term tribas, or tribade, was used to refer to a woman or intersex individual who actively penetrated another person (male or female) through the use of the clitoris or a dildo. As any sexual act was believed to require that one of the partners be "phallic" and that therefore sexual activity between women was impossible without this feature, mythology popularly associated lesbians with either having enlarged clitorises or as incapable of enjoying sexual activity without the substitution of a phallus.

In 1545, Charles Estienne was the first writer to identify the clitoris in a work based on dissection, but he concluded that it had a urinary function. Following this study, Realdo Colombo (also known as Renaldus Columbus), a lecturer in surgery at the University of Padua, Italy, published a book called De re anatomica in 1559, in which he describes the "seat of woman's delight". In his role as researcher, Colombo concluded, "Since no one has discerned these projections and their workings, if it is permissible to give names to things discovered by me, it should be called the love or sweetness of Venus.", about the mythological Venus, goddess of erotic love. Colombo's claim was disputed by his successor at Padua, Gabriele Falloppio (discoverer of the fallopian tube), who claimed that he was the first to discover the clitoris. In 1561, Falloppio stated, "Modern anatomists have entirely neglected it ... and do not say a word about it ... and if others have spoken of it, know that they have taken it from me or my students". This caused an upset in the European medical community, and, having read Colombo's and Falloppio's detailed descriptions of the clitoris, Vesalius stated, "It is unreasonable to blame others for incompetence on the basis of some sport of nature you have observed in some women and you can hardly ascribe this new and useless part, as if it were an organ, to healthy women". He concluded, "I think that such a structure appears in hermaphrodites who otherwise have well-formed genitals, as Paul of Aegina describes, but I have never once seen in any woman a penis (which Avicenna called albaratha and the Greeks called an enlarged nympha and classed as an illness) or even the rudiments of a tiny phallus".

The average anatomist had difficulty challenging Galen's or Vesalius' research; Galen was the most famous physician of the Greek era and his works were considered the standard of medical understanding up to and throughout the Renaissance (i.e. for almost two thousand years), and various terms being used to describe the clitoris seemed to have further confused the issue of its structure. In addition to Avicenna's naming it the albaratha or virga ("rod") and Colombo's calling it the sweetness of Venus, Hippocrates used the term columella ("little pillar"), and Albucasis, an Arabic medical authority, named it tentigo ("tension"). The names indicated that each description of the structures was about the body and glans of the clitoris but usually the glans. It was additionally known to the Romans, who named it (vulgar slang) landica. However, Albertus Magnus, one of the most prolific writers of the Middle Ages, felt that it was important to highlight "homologies between male and female structures and function" by adding "a psychology of sexual arousal" that Aristotle had not used to detail the clitoris. While in Constantine's treatise Liber de Coitu, the clitoris is referred to a few times, Magnus gave an equal amount of attention to male and female organs.

Like Avicenna, Magnus also used the word virga for the clitoris, but employed it for the male and female genitals; despite his efforts to give equal ground to the clitoris, the cycle of suppression and rediscovery of the organ continued, and a 16th-century justification for clitoridectomy appears to have been confused with intersex conditions and the imprecision created by the word nymphae substituted for the word clitoris. Nymphotomy was a medical operation to excise an unusually large clitoris, but what was considered "unusually large" was often a matter of perception. The procedure was routinely performed on Egyptian women, due to physicians such as Jacques Daléchamps who believed that this version of the clitoris was "an unusual feature that occurred in almost all Egyptian women [and] some of ours, so that when they find themselves in the company of other women, or their clothes rub them while they walk or their husbands wish to approach them, it erects like a male penis and indeed they use it to play with other women, as their husbands would do ... Thus the parts are cut".

=== 17th century–present day knowledge and vernacular ===
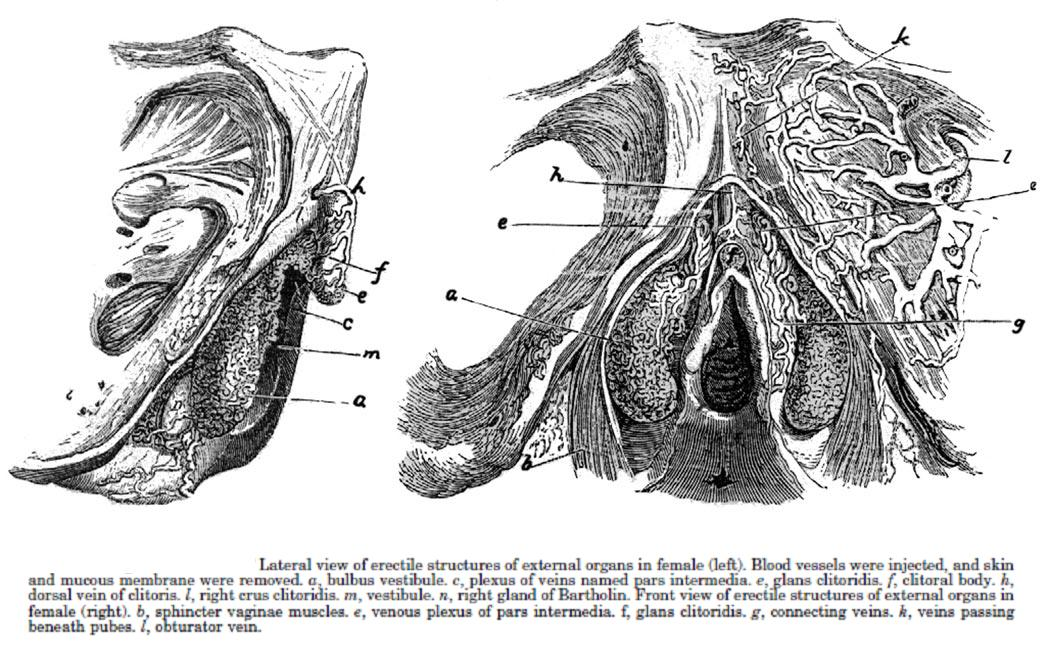
A Georg Ludwig Kobelt illustration of the anatomy of the clitoris (1844)

Caspar Bartholin (whom Bartholin's glands are named after), a 17th-century Danish anatomist, dismissed Colombo's and Falloppio's claims that they discovered the clitoris, arguing that the clitoris had been widely known to medical science since the second century. Although 17th-century midwives recommended to men and women that women should aspire to achieve orgasms to help them get pregnant for general health and well-being and to keep their relationships healthy, debate about the importance of the clitoris persisted, notably in the work of Regnier de Graaf in the 17th century and Georg Ludwig Kobelt in the 19th.

Like Falloppio and Bartholin, de Graaf criticized Colombo's claim of having discovered the clitoris; his work appears to have provided the first comprehensive account of clitoral anatomy. "We are extremely surprised that some anatomists make no more mention of this part than if it did not exist at all in the universe of nature", he stated. "In every cadaver, we have so far dissected we have found it quite perceptible to sight and touch". De Graaf stressed the need to distinguish nympha from clitoris, choosing to "always give [the clitoris] the name clitoris" to avoid confusion; this resulted in the frequent use of the correct name for the organ among anatomists, but considering that nympha was also varied in its use and eventually became the term specific to the labia minora, more confusion ensued. Debate about whether orgasm was even necessary for women began in the Victorian era, and Freud's 1905 theory about the immaturity of clitoral orgasms (see above) negatively affected women's sexuality throughout most of the 20th century.

Toward the end of World War I, a maverick British MP named Noel Pemberton Billing published an article entitled "The Cult of the Clitoris", furthering his conspiracy theories and attacking the actress Maud Allan and Margot Asquith, wife of the prime minister. The accusations led to a sensational libel trial, which Billing eventually won; Philip Hoare reports that Billing argued that "as a medical term, 'clitoris' would only be known to the 'initiated', and was incapable of corrupting moral minds". Jodie Medd argues regarding "The Cult of the Clitoris" that "the female non-reproductive but desiring body [...] simultaneously demands and refuses interpretative attention, inciting scandal through its very resistance to representation".

From the 18th to the 20th century, especially during the 20th, details of the clitoris from various genital diagrams presented in earlier centuries were omitted from later texts. The full extent of the clitoris was alluded to by Masters and Johnson in 1966, but in such a muddled fashion that the significance of their description became obscured; in 1981, the Federation of Feminist Women's Health Clinics (FFWHC) continued this process with anatomically precise illustrations identifying 18 structures of the clitoris. Despite the FFWHC's illustrations, Josephine Lowndes Sevely, in 1987, described the vagina as more of the counterpart of the penis.

Concerning other beliefs about the clitoris, Hite (1976 and 1981) found that, during sexual intimacy with a partner, clitoral stimulation was more often described by women as foreplay than as a primary method of sexual activity, including orgasm. Further, although the FFWHC's work significantly propelled feminist reformation of anatomical texts, it did not have a general impact. Helen O'Connell's late 1990s research motivated the medical community to start changing the way the clitoris is anatomically defined. O'Connell describes typical textbook descriptions of the clitoris as lacking detail and including inaccuracies, such as older and modern anatomical descriptions of the female human urethral and genital anatomy having been based on dissections performed on elderly cadavers whose erectile (clitoral) tissue had shrunk. She instead credits the work of Georg Ludwig Kobelt as the most comprehensive and accurate description of clitoral anatomy. MRI measurements, which provide a live and multi-planar method of examination, now complement the FFWHC's, as well as O'Connell's, research efforts concerning the clitoris, showing that the volume of clitoral erectile tissue is ten times that which is shown in doctors' offices and anatomy textbooks.

In Bruce Bagemihl's survey of The Zoological Record (1978–1997) – which contains over a million documents from over 6,000 scientific journals – 539 articles focusing on the penis were found, while seven were found focusing on the clitoris. In 2000, researchers Shirley Ogletree and Harvey Ginsberg concluded that there is a general neglect of the word clitoris in the common vernacular. They looked at the terms used to describe genitalia in the PsycINFO database from 1887 to 2000 and found that penis was used in 1,482 sources, vagina in 409, while clitoris was only mentioned in 83. They additionally analyzed 57 books listed in a computer database for sex instruction. In the majority of the books, penis was the most commonly discussed body part – mentioned more than clitoris, vagina, and uterus put together. They last investigated terminology used by college students, ranging from Euro-American (76%/76%), Hispanic (18%/14%), and African American (4%/7%), regarding the students' beliefs about sexuality and knowledge on the subject. The students were overwhelmingly educated to believe that the vagina is the female counterpart of the penis. The authors found that the student's belief that the inner portion of the vagina is the most sexually sensitive part of the female body correlated with negative attitudes toward masturbation and strong support for sexual myths.

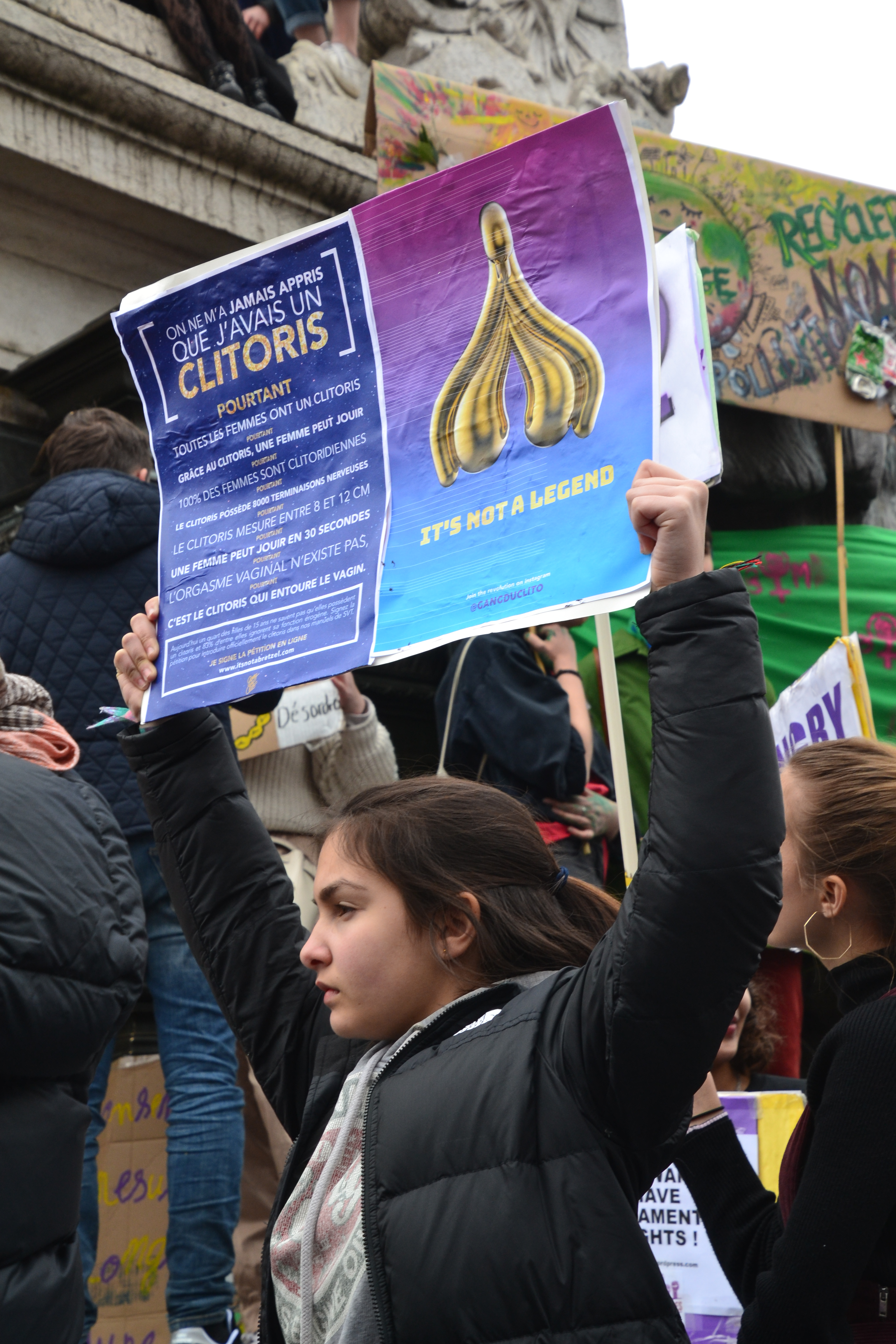
Protester for clitoris awareness at a women's rights rally in Paris, France (2019)

A study in 2005 reported that, among a sample of undergraduate students, the most frequently cited sources for knowledge about the clitoris were school and friends, and that this was associated with the least tested knowledge. Knowledge of the clitoris by self-exploration was the least cited, but "respondents correctly answered, on average, three of the five clitoral knowledge measures". The authors stated that "[k]nowledge correlated significantly with the frequency of women's orgasm in masturbation but not partnered sex" and that their "results are discussed in light of gender inequality and a social construction of sexuality, endorsed by both men and women, that privileges men's sexual pleasure over women's, such that orgasm for women is pleasing but ultimately incidental". They concluded that part of the solution to remedying "this problem" requires that males and females are taught more about the clitoris than is currently practiced.

The humanitarian group Clitoraid launched the first annual International Clitoris Awareness Week, from 6 to 12 May in 2015. Clitoraid spokesperson Nadine Gary stated that the group's mission is to raise public awareness about the clitoris because it has "been ignored, vilified, made taboo, and considered sinful and shameful for centuries". (See also Vulva activism)

Odile Fillod created a 3D printable, open source, full-size model of the clitoris, for use in a set of anti-sexist videos she had been commissioned to produce. Fillod was interviewed by Stephanie Theobald, whose article in The Guardian stated that the 3D model would be used for sex education in French schools, from primary to secondary level, from September 2016 onwards; this was not the case, but the story went viral across the world.

A questionnaire in a 2019 study was administered to a sample of educational sciences postgraduate students to trace the level of their knowledge concerning the organs of the female and male reproductive system. The authors reported that about two-thirds of the students failed to name parts of the vulva, such as the clitoris and labia, even after detailed pictures were provided to them. An analysis in 2022 reported that the clitoris is mentioned in only one out of 113 Greek secondary education textbooks used in biology classes from the 1870s to present.

An editorial of the Journal of Biological Education in 2026 calls for a shift in the way reproduction is taught in biology classrooms, i.e. the current strong emphasis on procreation be complemented by a greater focus on sexual pleasure. It is then suggested that this could be achieved by increasing attention within biology education to the external female reproductive organs, especially the clitoris, by accurately illustrating its detailed anatomy and clearly explaining its function.

=== Contemporary art ===
New York artist Sophia Wallace started work in 2012 on a multimedia project to challenge misconceptions about the clitoris. Based on O'Connell's 1998 research, Wallace's work emphasizes the sheer scope and size of the human clitoris. She says that ignorance of this still seems to be pervasive in modern society. "It is a curious dilemma to observe the paradox that on the one hand, the female body is the primary metaphor for sexuality, its use saturates advertising, art, and the mainstream erotic imaginary", she said. "Yet, the clitoris, the true female sexual organ, is virtually invisible". The project is called Cliteracy and it includes a "clit rodeo", which is interactive, climb-on model of a giant golden clitoris, including its inner parts, produced with the help of sculptor Kenneth Thomas. "It's been a showstopper wherever it's been shown. People are hungry to be able to talk about this", Wallace said. "I love seeing men standing up for the clit [...] Cliteracy is about not having one's body controlled or legislated [...] Not having access to the pleasure that is your birthright is a deeply political act".

Another project started in New York, in 2016, street art that has since spread to almost 100 cities: Clitorosity, a "community-driven effort to celebrate the full structure of the clitoris", combining chalk drawings and words to spark interaction and conversation with passers-by, which the team documents on social media. In 2016, Lori-Malépart Traversy made an animated documentary about the unrecognized anatomy of the clitoris.

Alli Sebastian Wolf created a golden 100∶1 scale model of the clitoris in 2017, called the Glitoris and said, she hopes knowledge of the clitoris will soon become so uncontroversial that making art about them would be as irrelevant as making art about penises.

Other projects listed by the BBC include Clito Clito, body-positive jewellery made in Berlin; Clitorissima, a documentary intended to normalize mother-daughter conversations about the clitoris; and a ClitArt festival in London, encompassing spoken word performances as well as visual art. French art collective Les Infemmes (a blend word of "infamous" and "women") published a fanzine whose title can be translated as "The Clit Cheatsheet".

=== Influence on female genital mutilation ===
Significant controversy surrounds female genital mutilation (FGM), with the World Health Organization (WHO) being one of many health organizations that have campaigned against the procedures on behalf of human rights, stating that "FGM has no health benefits" and that it is "a violation of the human rights of girls and women" which "reflects deep-rooted inequality between the sexes". The practice has existed at one point or another in almost all human civilizations, most commonly to exert control over the sexual behavior, including masturbation, of girls and women, but also to change the clitoris' appearance. Custom and tradition are the most frequently cited reasons for FGM, with some cultures believing that not performing it has the possibility of disrupting the cohesiveness of their social and political systems, such as FGM also being a part of a girl's initiation into adulthood. Often, a girl is not considered an adult in an FGM-practicing society unless she has undergone FGM, and the "removal of the clitoris and labia – viewed by some as the male parts of a woman's body – is thought to enhance the girl's femininity, often synonymous with docility and obedience".

Female genital mutilation is carried out in several societies, especially in Africa, with 85 percent of genital mutilations performed in Africa consisting of clitoridectomy or excision, and to a lesser extent in other parts of the Middle East and Southeast Asia, on girls from a few days old to mid-adolescent, often to reduce the sexual desire to preserve vaginal virginity. The practice of FGM has spread globally, as immigrants from Asia, Africa, and the Middle East bring the custom with them. In the United States, it is sometimes practiced on girls born with a clitoris that is larger than usual. Comfort Momoh, who specializes in the topic of FGM, states that FGM might have been "practiced in ancient Egypt as a sign of distinction among the aristocracy"; there are reports that traces of infibulation are on Egyptian mummies. FGM is still routinely practiced in Egypt. Greenberg et al. report that "one study found that 97 percent of married women in Egypt had had some form of genital mutilation performed". Amnesty International estimated in 1997 that more than two million FGM procedures are performed every year.

== Other animals ==
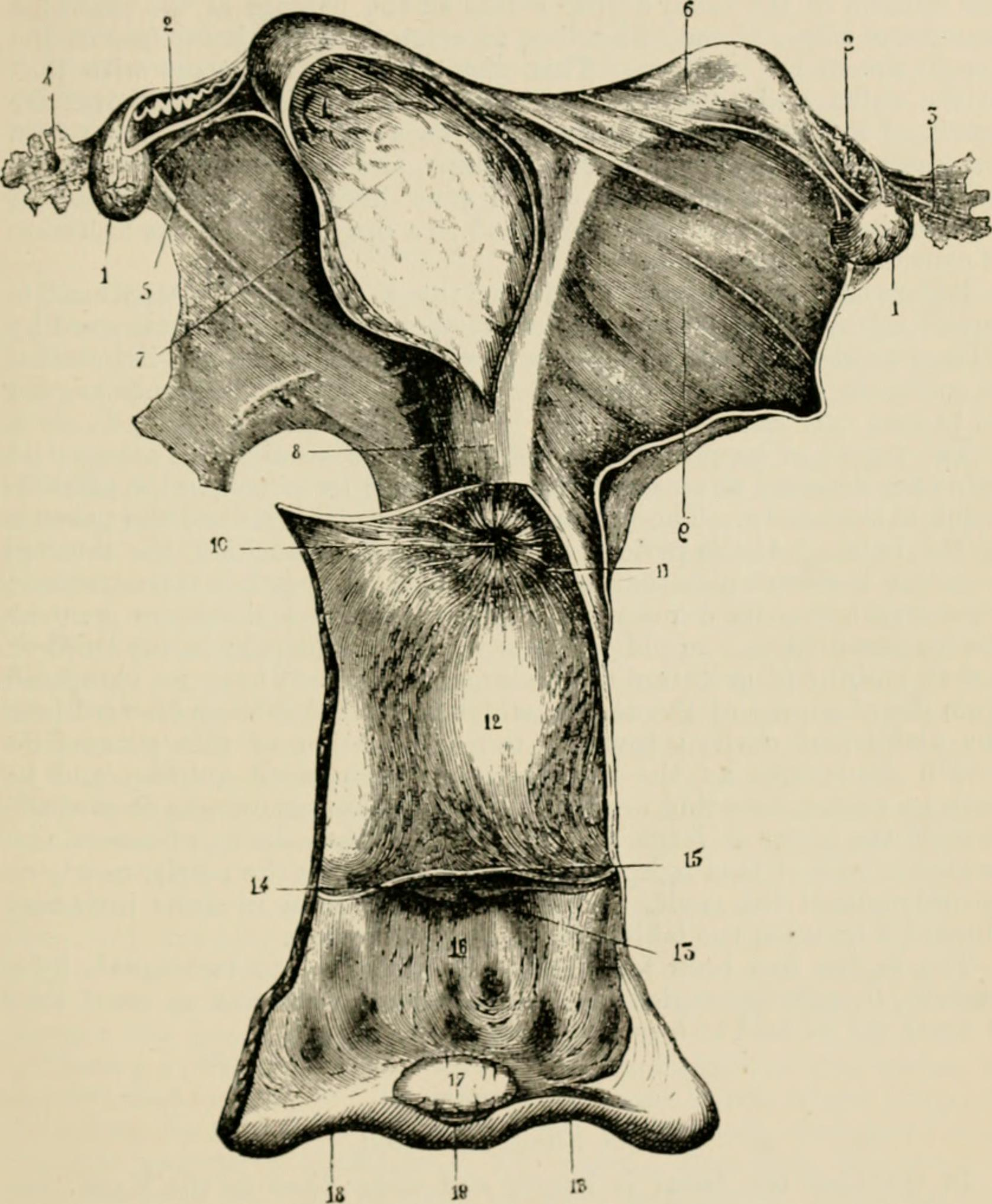
1901 illustration of the female reproductive system of a horse (mare); clitoris labeled as 17.

Although the clitoris (and clitoral prepuce/sheath) exists in all mammal species, there are few detailed studies of the anatomy of the clitoris in non-humans. Studies have been done on the clitoris of cats, sheep and mice. Some mammals have clitoral glands. The clitoris is especially developed in fossas, non-human apes, lemurs, moles, and often contains a small bone known as the os clitoridis. Many species of talpid moles exhibit peniform clitorises that are tunneled by the urethra and are found to have erectile tissue. The clitoris is contained in fossa, which is a small pouch of tissue in horses and dogs. The clitoris is found in other amniotic creatures including reptiles such as turtles and crocodilians, and birds such as ratites (e.g., cassowaries, ostriches) and anatids (e.g., swans, ducks). The hemiclitoris is one-half of a paired structure in squamates (lizards and snakes). Scientists state that female spotted hyenas are the only non-intersex female mammals devoid of an external vaginal opening, and whose sexual anatomy is distinct from intersex cases.

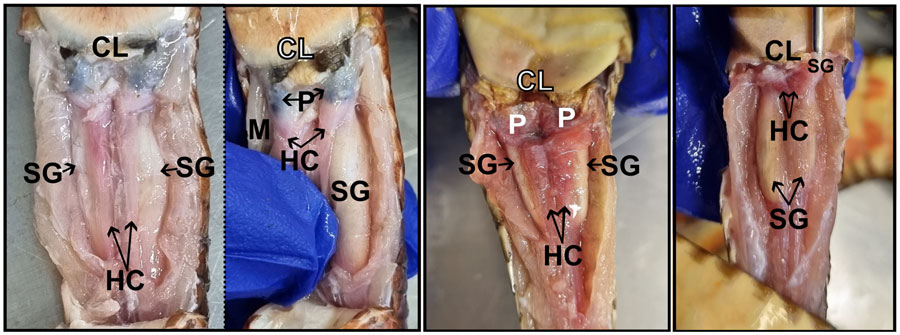
The hemiclitorises (labeled "HC") of a few snakes shown under dissection

=== Non-human primates ===
In spider monkeys, the clitoris is especially developed and has an interior passage, or urethra, that makes it almost identical to the penis, and it retains and distributes urine droplets as the female spider monkey moves around. Scholar Alan F. Dixson stated that this urine "is voided at the bases of the clitoris, flows down the shallow groove on its perineal surface, and is held by the skin folds on each side of the groove". Because spider monkeys of South America have pendulous and erectile clitorises long enough to be mistaken for a penis, researchers and observers of the species look for a scrotum to determine the animal's sex; a similar approach is to identify scent-marking glands that may also be present on the clitoris.

The clitoris erects in squirrel monkeys during dominance displays, which indirectly influences the squirrel monkeys' reproductive success.

The clitoris of bonobos is larger and more externalized than in most mammals; Natalie Angier said that a young adolescent "female bonobo is maybe half the weight of a human teenager, but her clitoris is three times bigger than the human equivalent, and visible enough to waggle unmistakably as she walks". Female bonobos often engage in the practice of genital-genital (GG) rubbing. Ethologist Jonathan Balcombe stated that female bonobos rub their clitorises together rapidly for ten to twenty seconds, and this behavior, "which may be repeated in rapid succession, is usually accompanied by grinding, shrieking, and clitoral engorgement"; he added that, on average, they engage in this practice "about once every two hours", and as bonobos sometimes mate face-to-face, "evolutionary biologist Marlene Zuk has suggested that the position of the clitoris in bonobos and some other primates has evolved to maximize stimulation during sexual intercourse".

Many strepsirrhine species exhibit elongated clitorises that are either fully or partially tunneled by the urethra, including mouse lemurs, dwarf lemurs, all Eulemur species, lorises and galagos. Some of these species also exhibit a membrane seal across the vagina that closes the vaginal opening during the non-mating seasons, most notably mouse and dwarf lemurs. The clitoral morphology of the ring-tailed lemur is the most well-studied. They are described as having "elongated, pendulous clitorises that are [fully] tunneled by a urethra". The urethra is surrounded by erectile tissue, which allows for significant swelling during breeding seasons, but this erectile tissue differs from the typical male corpus spongiosum. Non-pregnant adult ring-tailed females do not show higher testosterone levels than males, but they do exhibit higher A_{4} and estrogen levels during seasonal aggression. During pregnancy, estrogen, A_{4}, and testosterone levels are raised, but female fetuses are still "protected" from excess testosterone. These "masculinized" genitalia are often found alongside other traits, such as female-dominated social groups, reduced sexual dimorphism that makes females the same size as males, and even ratios of sexes in adult populations. This phenomenon that has been dubbed the "lemur syndrome". A 2014 study of Eulemur masculinization proposed that behavioral and morphological masculinization in female Lemuriformes is an ancestral trait that likely emerged after their split from Lorisiformes.

=== Spotted hyenas ===
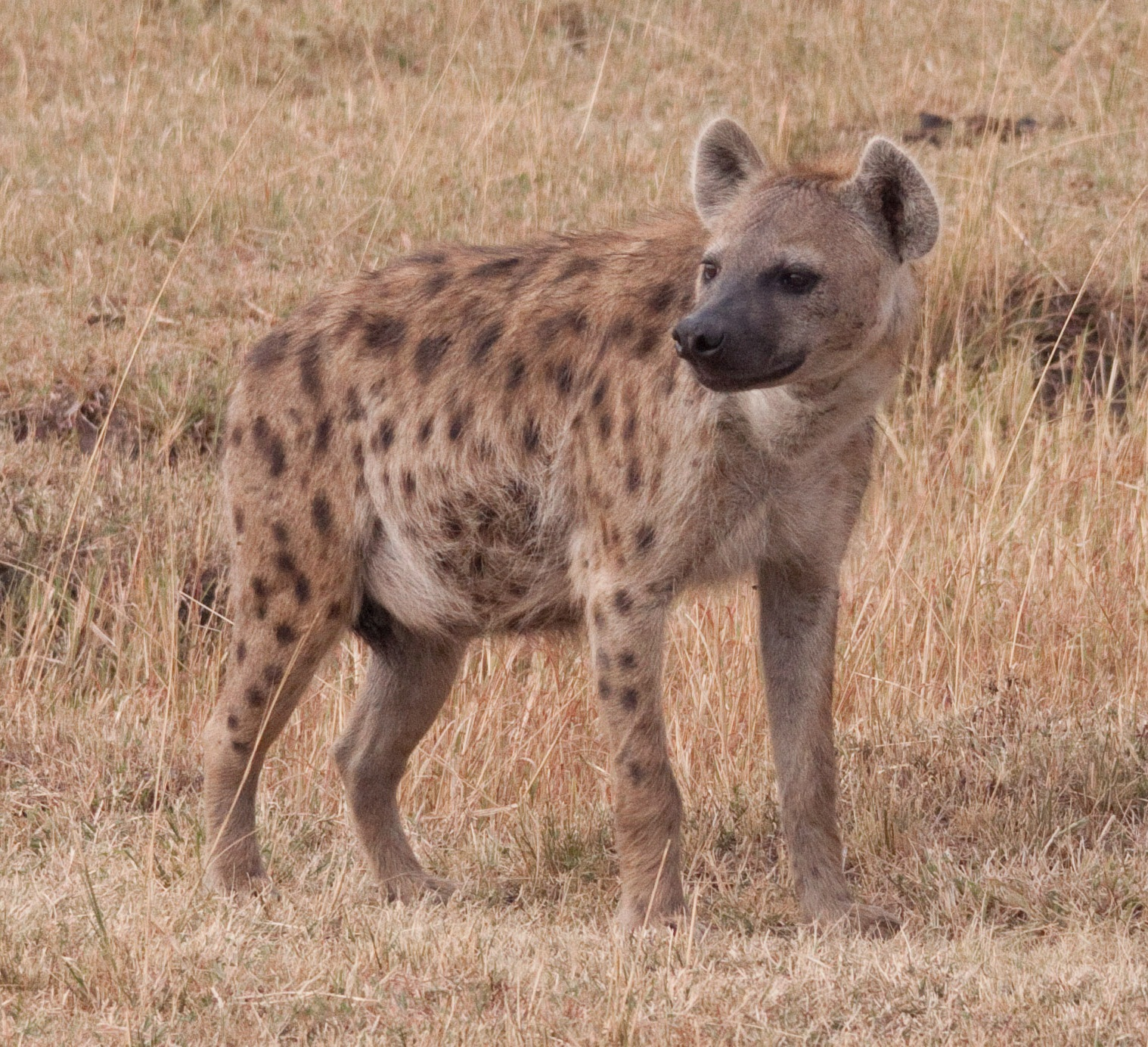
With a urogenital system in which the female urinates, mates and gives birth via an enlarged, erectile clitoris, female spotted hyenas are the only female mammals devoid of an external vaginal opening.

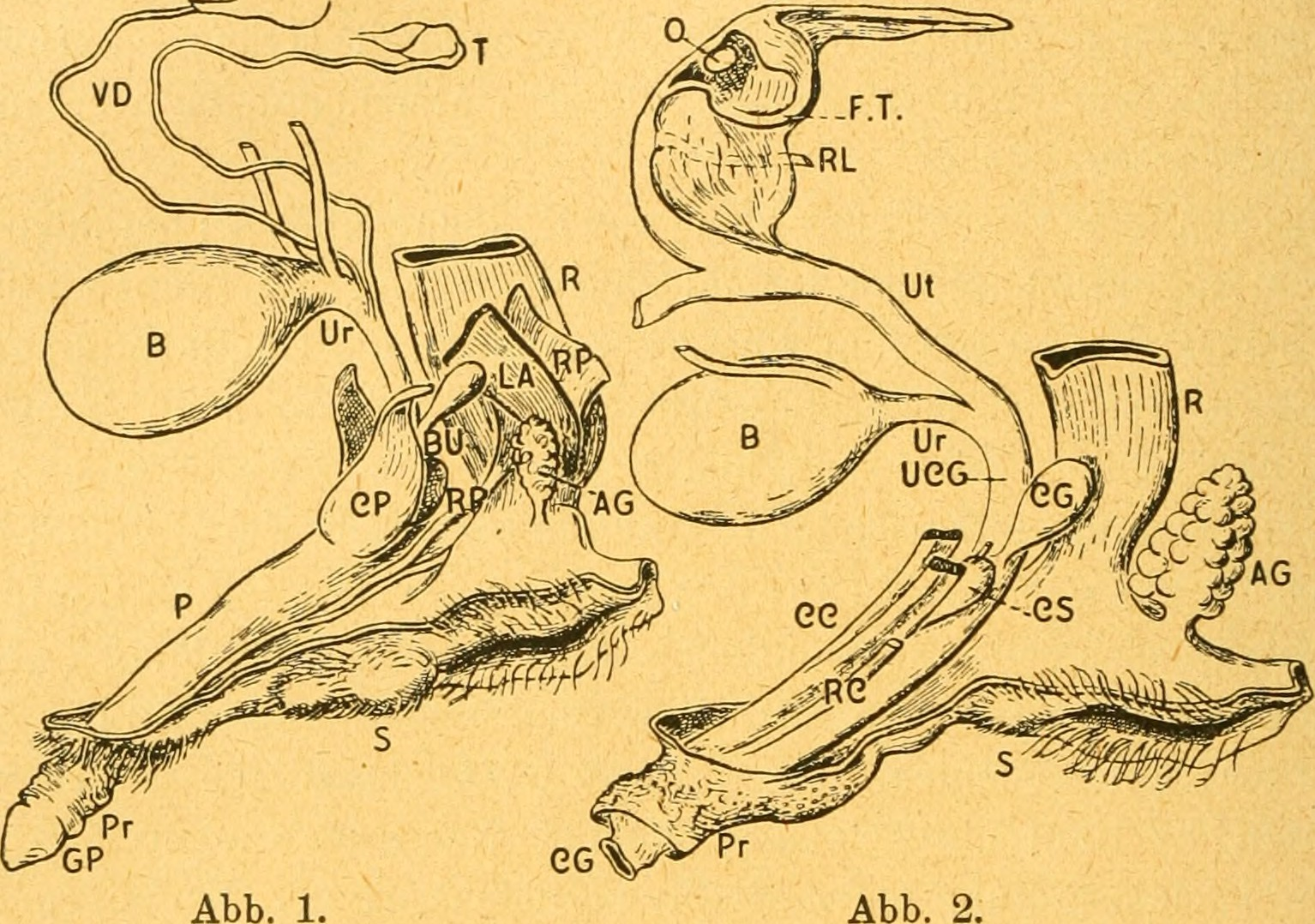
Male and female reproductive systems of the spotted hyena, from Schmotzer & Zimmerman, Anatomischer Anzeiger (1922). Abb. 1 (Fig. 1.) Male reproductive anatomy. Abb. 2 (Fig. 2.) Female reproductive anatomy. Principal abbreviations (from Schmotzer & Zimmerman) are: T, testis; VD, vas deferens; BU, bulbus urethrae; Ur, urethra; R, rectum; P, penis; S, scrotum; O, ovarium; FT, tuba Fallopii; RL, ligamentum uteri; Ut, uterus; CC, corpus clitoridis. Remaining abbreviations, in alphabetical order, are: AG, glandula analis; B, vesica urinaria; CG, glandula Cowperi; CP, corpus penis; CS, corpus spongiosum; GC, glans clitoridis; GP, glans penis; LA, musculus levator ani; Pr, praeputium; RC, musculus retractor clitoridis; RP, musculus retractor penis; UCG, canalis urogenitalis.

While female spotted hyenas were sometimes referred to as pseudohermaphrodites and scientists of ancient and later historical times believed that they were hermaphrodites, modern scientists do not refer to them as such. That designation is typically reserved for those who simultaneously exhibit features of both sexes; the genetic makeup of female spotted hyenas "are clearly distinct" from male spotted hyenas.

Female spotted hyenas have a clitoris 90 percent as long and the same diameter as a male penis (171 millimetres long and 22 millimetres in diameter), and this pseudo-penis' formation seems largely androgen-independent because it appears in the female fetus before differentiation of the fetal ovary and adrenal gland. The spotted hyenas have a highly erectile clitoris, complete with a false scrotum; author John C. Wingfield stated that "the resemblance to male genitalia is so close that sex can be determined with confidence only by palpation of the scrotum". The pseudo-penis can also be distinguished from the males' genitalia by its greater thickness and more rounded glans. The female possesses no external vagina, as the labia are fused to form a pseudo-scrotum. In the females, this scrotum consists of soft adipose tissue. Like male spotted hyenas with regard to their penises, the female spotted hyenas have small spines on the head of their clitorises, which scholar Catherine Blackledge said makes "the clitoris tip feel like soft sandpaper". She added that the clitoris "extends away from the body in a sleek and slender arc, measuring, on average, over 17 cm from root to tip. Just like a penis, [it] is fully erectile, raising its head in hyena greeting ceremonies, social displays, games of rough and tumble or when sniffing out peers". Due to their higher levels of androgen exposure during fetal development, the female hyenas are significantly more muscular and aggressive than their male counterparts; social-wise, they are of higher rank than the males, being dominant or dominant and alpha, and the females who have been exposed to higher levels of androgen than average become higher-ranking than their female peers. Subordinate females lick the clitorises of higher-ranked females as a sign of submission and obedience, but females also lick each other's clitorises as a greeting or to strengthen social bonds; in contrast, while all males lick the clitorises of dominant females, the females will not lick the penises of males because males are considered to be of lowest rank.

The female spotted hyenas urinate, copulate and give birth through the clitoris since the urethra and vagina exit through the clitoral glans. This trait makes mating more laborious for the male than in other mammals, and also makes attempts to sexually coerce (physically force sexual activity on) females futile. Joan Roughgarden, an ecologist and evolutionary biologist, said that because the hyena's clitoris is higher on the belly than the vagina in most mammals, the male hyena "must slide his rear under the female when mating so that his penis lines up with [her clitoris]". In an action similar to pushing up a shirtsleeve, the "female retracts the [pseudo-penis] on itself, and creates an opening into which the male inserts his own penis". The male must practice this act, which can take a couple of months to successfully perform. Female spotted hyenas exposed to larger doses of androgen have significantly damaged ovaries, making it difficult to conceive. After giving birth, the pseudo-penis is stretched and loses much of its original aspects; it becomes a slack-walled and reduced prepuce with an enlarged orifice with split lips. Approximately 15% of the females die during their first time giving birth, and over 60% of their species' firstborn young die.

A 2006 Baskin et al. study concluded, "The basic anatomical structures of the corporeal bodies in both sexes of humans and spotted hyenas were similar. As in humans, the dorsal nerve distribution was unique in being devoid of nerves at the 12 o'clock position in the penis and clitoris of the spotted hyena" and that "[d]orsal nerves of the penis/clitoris in humans and male spotted hyenas tracked along both sides of the corporeal body to the corpus spongiosum at the 5 and 7 o'clock positions. The dorsal nerves penetrated the corporeal body and distally the glans in the hyena", and in female hyenas, "the dorsal nerves fanned out laterally on the clitoral body. Glans morphology was different in appearance in both sexes, being wide and blunt in the female and tapered in the male".

== See also ==
- Clitoral enlargement
- Clitoral pump
- Clitoria, a type of tropical plant
- The Evolution of Human Sexuality
- Nocturnal clitoral tumescence
