= Deep dorsal vein =

Deep dorsal vein may refer to:

- Deep dorsal veins of the penis
- Deep dorsal vein of clitoris
