= Crus of clitoris =

One of two erectile tissue structures of the human clitoris

Clitoral crura
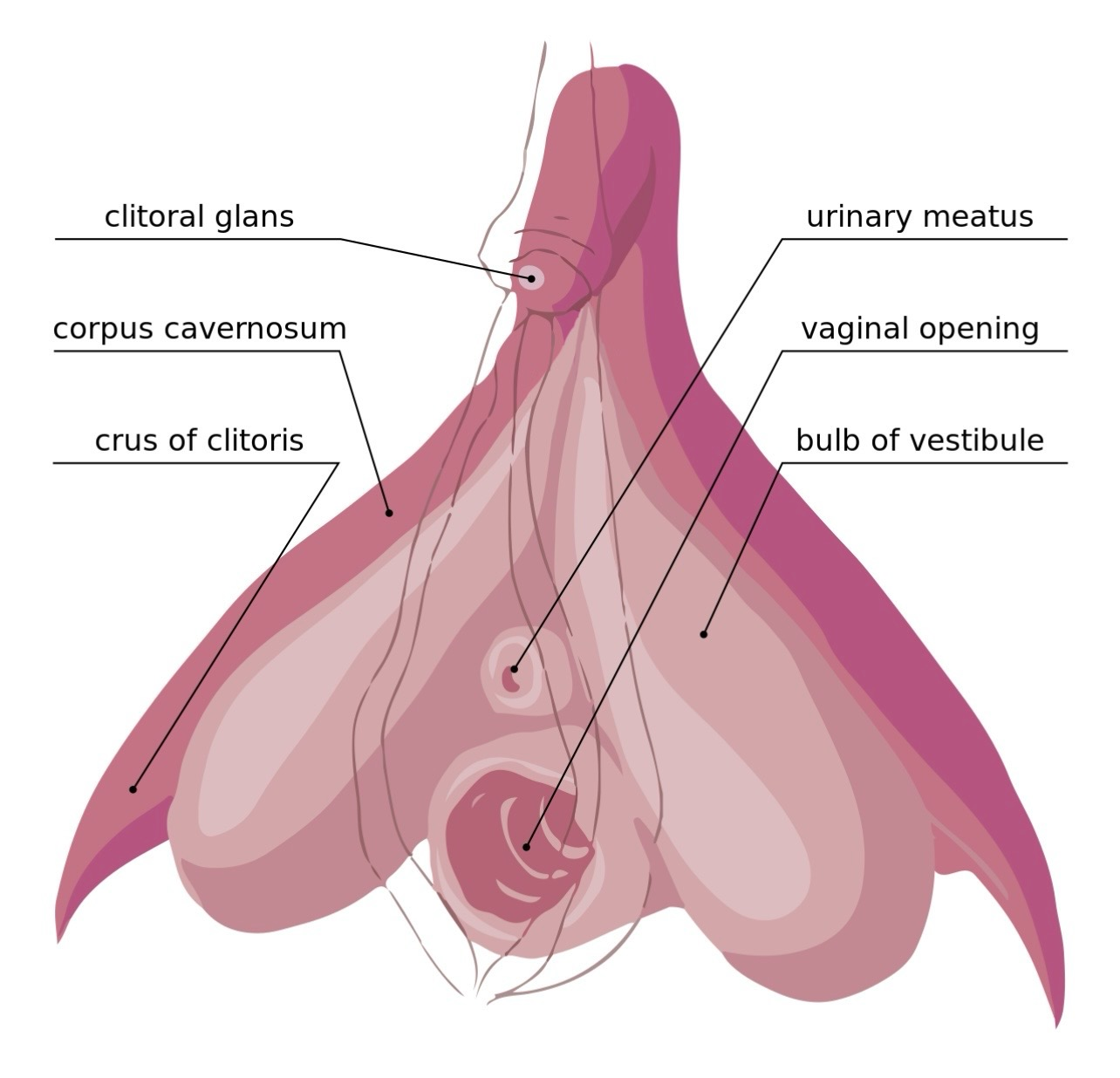
- The internal anatomy of the human vulva, with the clitoral hood and labia minora indicated as lines.

Details
- Part of: Clitoris
- Artery: Deep artery of clitoris
- Lymph: Superficial inguinal lymph nodes

Identifiers
- Latin: crus clitoridis
- TA98: A09.2.02.002
- FMA: 20175

The clitoral crura (sing.: clitoral crus) are two erectile tissue structures, which together form a "V" shape. Crus is a Latin word that means "leg". Each "leg" of the V converges on the clitoral body. At each divergent point is a corpus cavernosum.

Together with the vestibular bulbs, they form the clitoral root. The crura are attached to the pubic arch, and are adjacent to the vestibular bulbs.

The crura flank the urethra, urethral sponge, and vagina and extend back toward the pubis. Each clitoral crus connects to the rami of the pubis and the ischium.

During sexual arousal, the crura become engorged with blood, as does all of the erectile tissue of the clitoris.

The clitoral crura are each covered by an ischiocavernosus muscle.

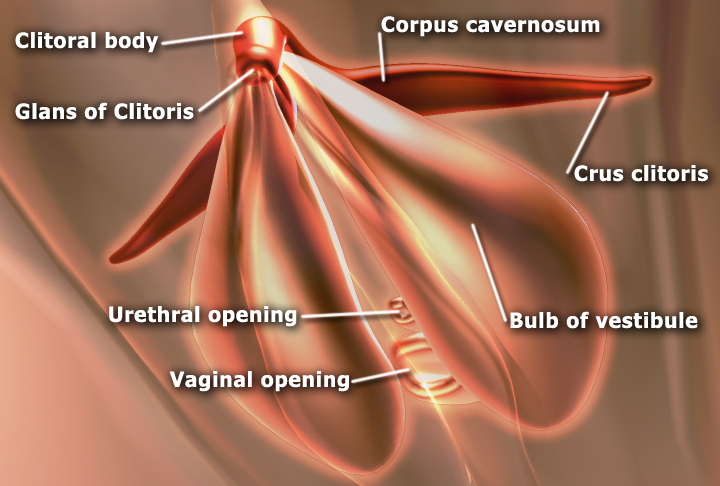
Shows the sub-areas of the clitoris. Areas include clitoral glans, body, crura. Also shows vestibular bulbs and corpora cavernosa

== See also ==
- Crus of penis
- Erectile tissue
