= Clitoral erection =

Physiological phenomenon involving the engorgement of the clitoris

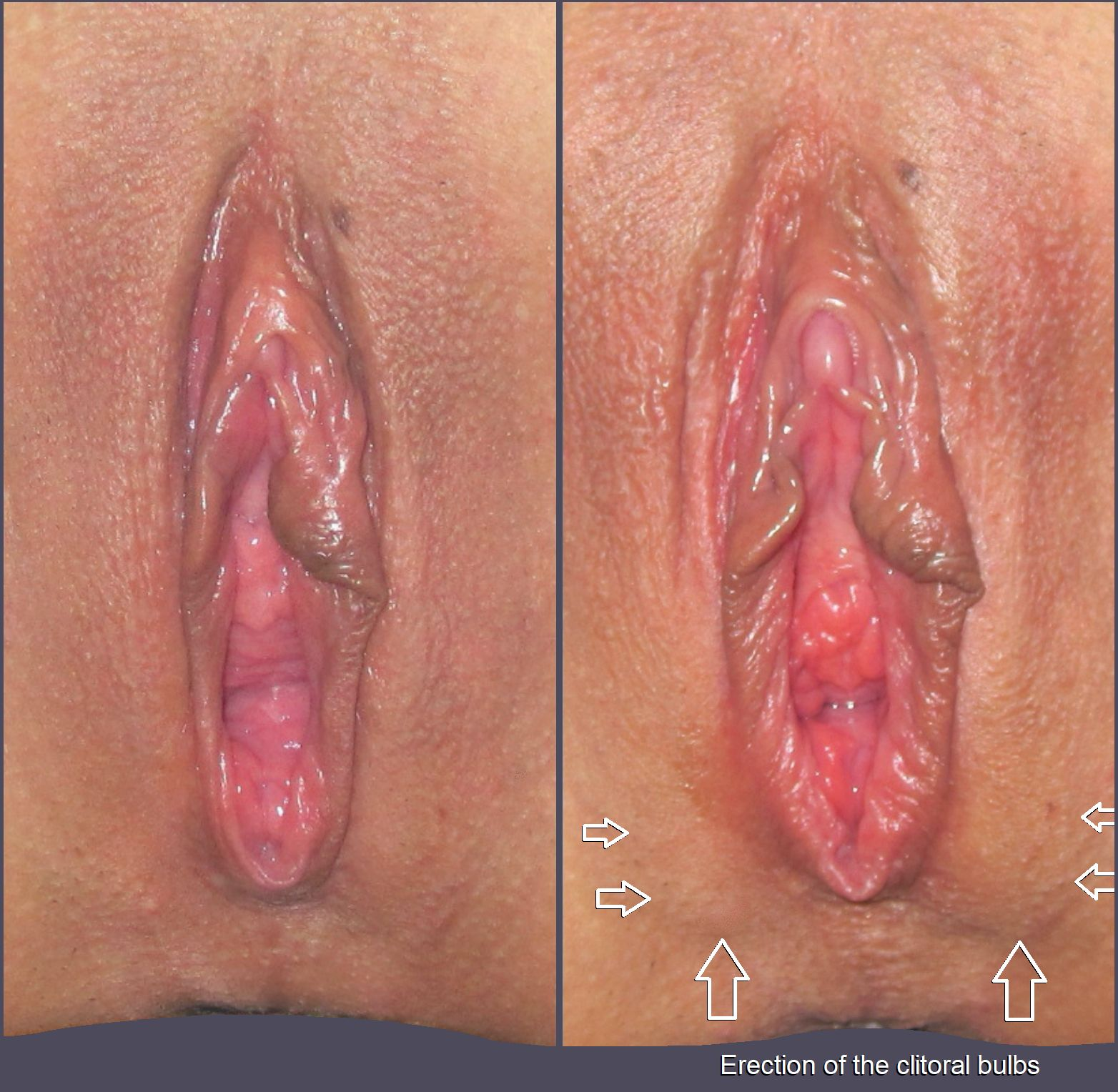
Left image: Mild sexual arousal. Right image: Strong sexual arousal with erection of the vestibular bulbs under the skin on both sides of the vaginal opening and exposed clitoral glans.

Clitoral erection (also known as clitoral tumescence or female erection) is a physiological phenomenon where the clitoris becomes enlarged and firm, the female equivalent of a penile erection.

Clitoral erection is the result of a complex interaction of psychological, neural, vascular, and endocrine factors, and is usually, though not exclusively, associated with sexual arousal or sexual activity. Erections should eventually subside, and the prolonged state of clitoral erection even while not aroused is a condition that could become painful. This swelling and shrinking to a relaxed state seems linked to nitric oxide's effects on tissues in the clitoris, similar to its effect on the male erection.

== Physiology ==
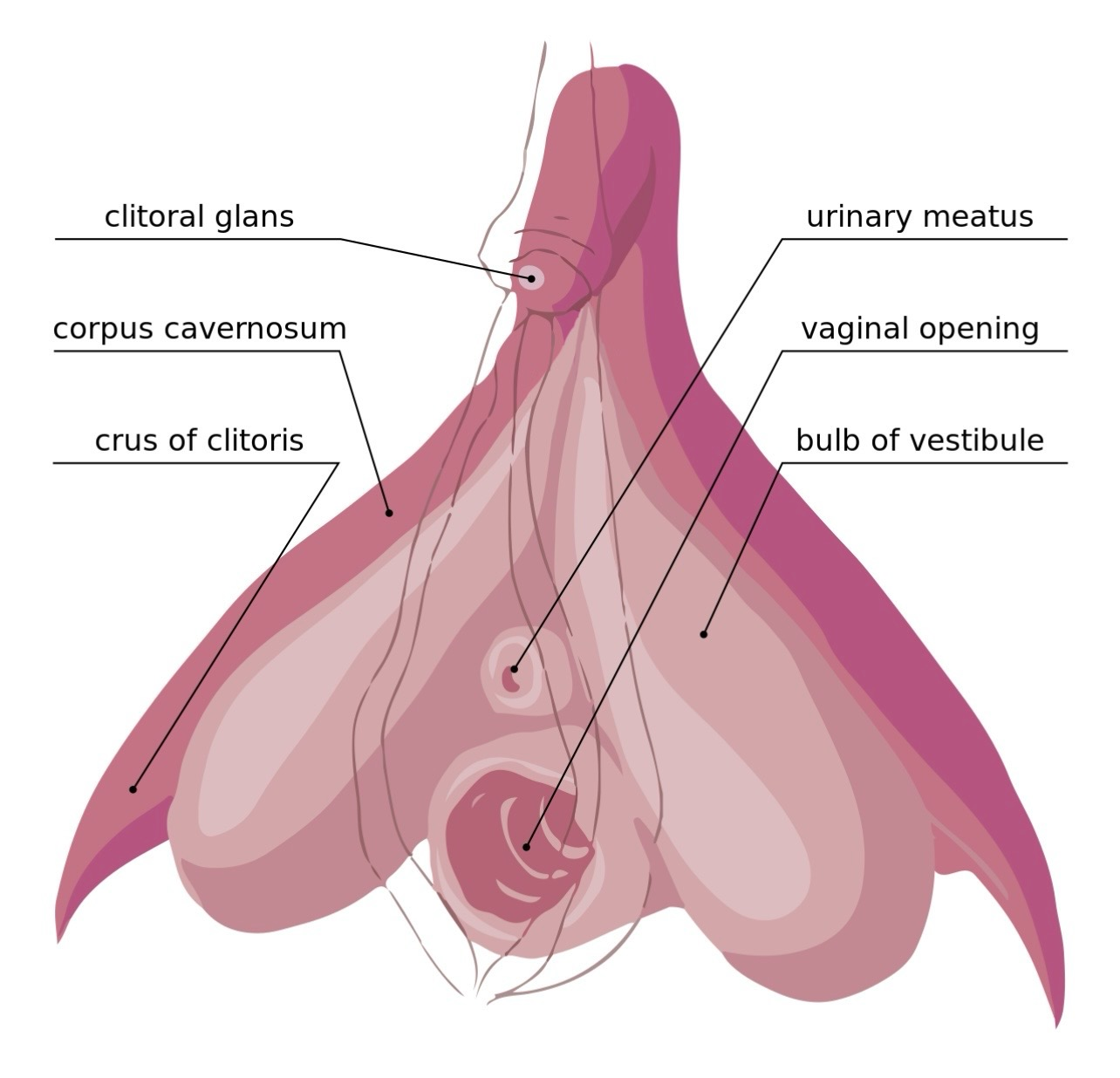
The internal anatomy of the human vulva, with the clitoral hood and labia minora indicated as lines.

The clitoris is the homolog to the penis in the male. Similarly, the clitoris and its erection can subtly differ in size.

The visible part of the clitoris, the glans clitoridis, varies in size from a few millimeters to one centimeter and is located at the front junction of the labia minora (inner lips), above the opening of the urethra. It is covered by the clitoral hood.

Any type of motion can increase blood flow to this organ and this results in increased secretions which lubricate the vagina. There are many ways to stimulate the clitoris.

Clitoral erection occurs when the corpora cavernosa, two expandable erectile structures, become engorged with blood. This may result from any of various physiological stimuli, including sexual arousal. During sexual arousal, arterial blood flow to the clitoris is increased, and trabecular smooth muscle within the clitoris relaxes allowing blood to engorge the erectile tissues. The ischiocavernosus and bulbospongiosus muscles contract to compress the dorsal vein of the clitoris to stop drainage of the clitoris, trapping the blood. The erectile tissues are composed of endothelium-lined vascular spaces in a trabecular matrix, with the endothelium-lined vascular spaces surrounded by smooth muscle capable of contraction and relaxation.

During sexual arousal, arterial blood flow to the clitoris is increased, and within the clitoris, the arteries further branch to supply the erectile tissues. The trabecular smooth muscles of the erectile tissue relax increasing blood flow to fill the vascular spaces, and expanding the erectile tissues until they are fully engorged with blood. The ischiocavernosus and bulbocavernosus muscles contract, compressing the dorsal vein of the clitoris. This compression of the vein restricts drainage of the erectile structures, trapping the blood. This process stretches the tunica albuginea. As a result, the clitoris becomes tumescent to accommodate the increased intracavernosous pressure. The tunica albuginea of the clitoris is made up of one layer making it more elastic than the tunica albuginea of the penis, which is composed of two layers. Erick Janssen (2007) elaborates on this reporting that "the corpora cavernosa of the clitoris are essentially similar to that of the penis except that there is no subalbugineal layer interposed between the tunica albuginea and the erectile tissue. In the penis, this tissue engorges with blood during sexual arousal and becomes compressed against the unyielding tunica, creating penile rigidity – a true erection. The lack of this plexus in the clitoris indicates that while the organ can become tumescent or engorged, it cannot, like the penis, become stiffly erect. The clitoris thus does not become erect with sexual excitement, but engorged." In addition, the tunica albuginea around the glans is thinner than around the shaft in both the clitoris and penis. This gives the glans less firmness relative to the shaft. The extrusion of the glans clitoridis and thinning of the skin enhances sensitivity to physical contact. After a female has orgasmed, the erection usually ends, but this may take time.

== Medical conditions ==
=== Clitoral priapism ===
Priapism, while more common in males, is a condition that can also affect the clitoris. Symptoms include painful engorgement, swelling, and pain in the area around the clitoris.

== Other animals ==
Among capuchin monkeys, clitoral erection is possible and makes the clitoris more visible than in its relaxed state where it is hidden by a preputial fold.

== See also ==
- Biological functions of nitric oxide
- Camel toe
- Nocturnal clitoral tumescence
- Sexual function
