= Clitoris piercing =

Type of body piercing

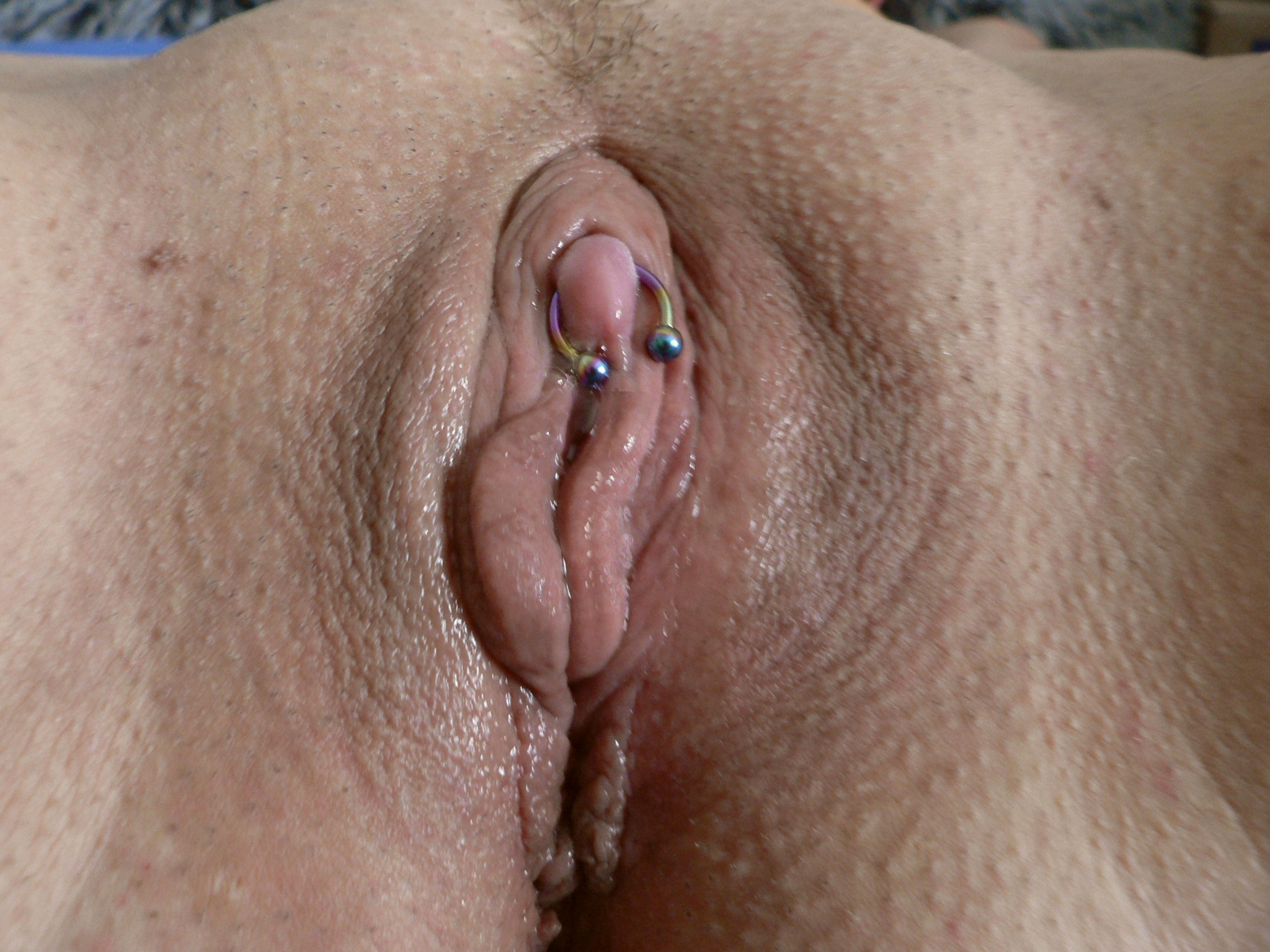
- Location: Clitoral glans
- Jewelry: Captive bead ring, barbell

A clitoris piercing is a genital piercing placed directly through the head (glans) of the clitoris itself. It is a relatively uncommon piercing by choice because of the potential for nerve damage and the anatomical unsuitability of most persons for the piercing.

Most piercing studios will refuse to do a clitoral piercing. It is often confused with the more common clitoral hood piercing, which pierces only the hood covering the clitoral glans.

Depending on the anatomy of the individual, a clitoris piercing can be oriented either vertically or horizontally.

== History and culture ==
This piercing is of contemporary origin and is uncommon. In 1989, piercer Jim Ward, interviewed by Andrea Juno in Modern Primitives, stated "I've been in the business for over 10 years and I haven't done more than half a dozen clit piercings."

Piercer Elayne Angel stated that of the "very small number of women who genuinely desire a clitoris piercing (rather than the more common clitoral hood piercing), 90 to 95 percent are not suitably built to accommodate jewelry through the clitoral head."

Also, it's not very efficient while having sex.

== Gallery ==
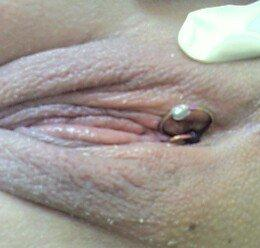
Two clitoris piercings with captive bead rings along with a Christina piercing

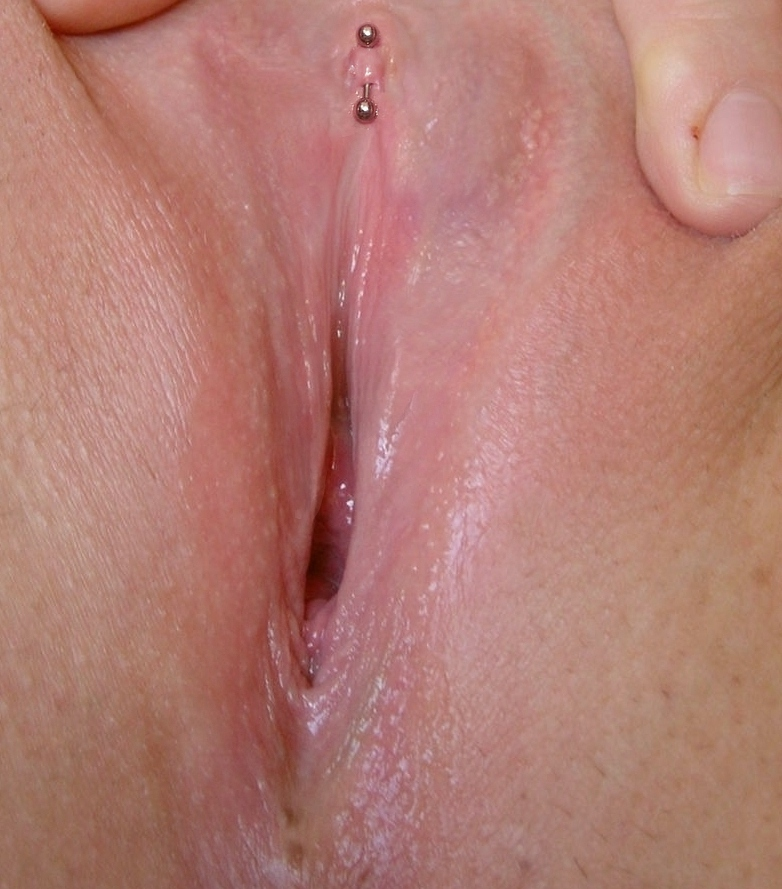
A vertical clitoris piercing with a barbell on after a labiaplasty (labia minora and clitoral hood removed)
