= Clitoral index =

Female vulval measurement

The clitoral index, defined as the product of the sagittal and transverse dimensions of the glans clitoridis, is sometimes used as a measure of virilization in women. In one study, the mean, and also median, clitoral index of a group of 200 normal women was measured as being roughly 18.5mm^{2}.

== See also ==
- Clitoromegaly
