= Georg Ludwig Kobelt =

German anatomist (1804–1857)

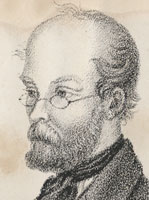
Georg Ludwig Kobelt

Georg Ludwig Kobelt (March 12, 1804 in Kehl – May 18, 1857) was a German anatomist. He studied medicine at the University of Heidelberg, where he was a student of Friedrich Tiedemann (1781–1861). He received his medical doctorate in 1833, later working as a prosector at Heidelberg. From 1841, he was a prosector at the University of Freiburg, subsequently becoming an associate professor (1844), followed by a full professorship in anatomy a few years later (1847).

Kobelt is remembered for his studies in sexual anatomy. In 1844, he published the influential Die männlichen und weiblichen Wollust-Organe des Menschen und einiger Säugetiere ("The Male and Female Organs of Sexual Arousal in Man and some other Mammals"). Kobelt is credited for providing a comprehensive and accurate description of the function of the clitoris.

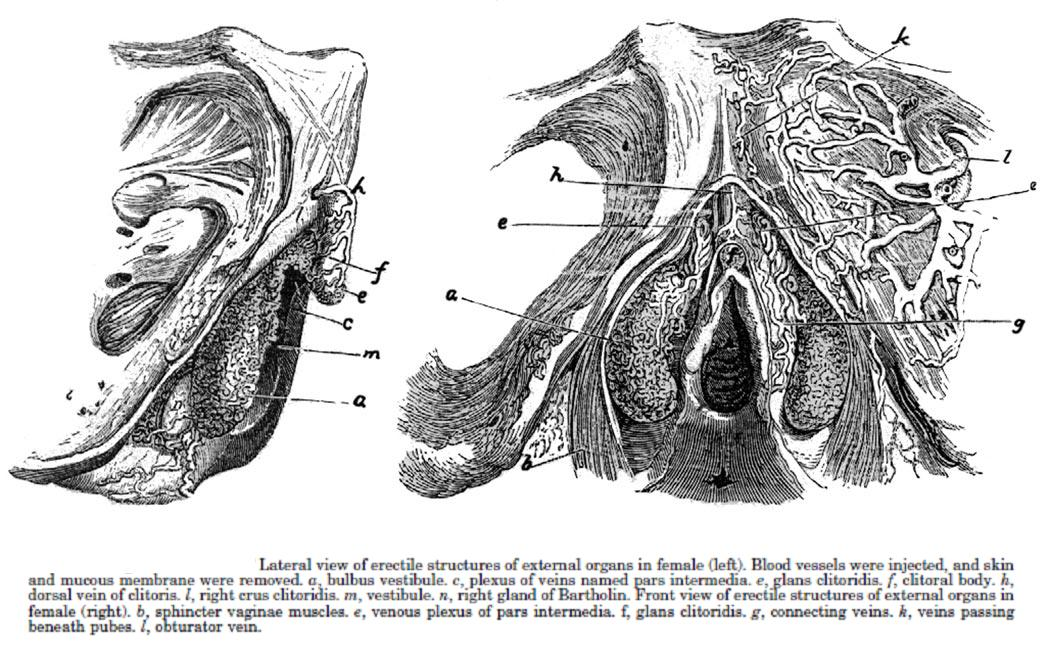
Dissection of the pubic region with clitoris. Preparation of Georg Ludwig Kobelt [1844]

The eponymous "Kobelt's tubules" are named after him, which are remnants of mesonephric ducts in the paroophoron. These remnants are sometimes referred to as Wolffian tubules, named after Caspar Friedrich Wolff (1733–1774).

== Notes ==
- This article is partially based on a translation of an equivalent article from the German Wikipedia.
