= Superficial dorsal veins of clitoris =

Tributary of the external pudendal vein

Details
- Drains from: Clitoris
- Drains to: External pudendal vein
- Artery: Dorsal artery of clitoris

Identifiers
- Latin: venae dorsales superficiales clitoridis
- TA98: A12.3.11.008F
- TA2: 5062
- FMA: 75397

The superficial dorsal veins of clitoris is a tributary of the external pudendal vein.
