= Nymphotomy =

Surgical procedure of incision into the labia minora

- Specialty: Gynaecology

Nymphotomy is the surgical procedure of incision into the labia minora. Surgical removal of the labia minora is called nymphectomy. In plastic surgery, the term labiaplasty, which describes plastic surgery of the labia (often in the form of labia minora reduction) is now more commonly used.

The term nymphectomy is also used to describe removal of parts of the labia as part of female genital cutting.
