= Ischiocavernosus muscle =

Sheet of fibrous tissue between the thigh and the front of the perineum

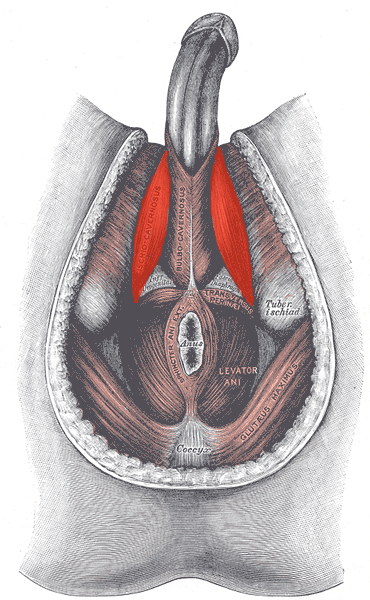
- Muscles of male perineum (ischiocavernosus visible at upper left)

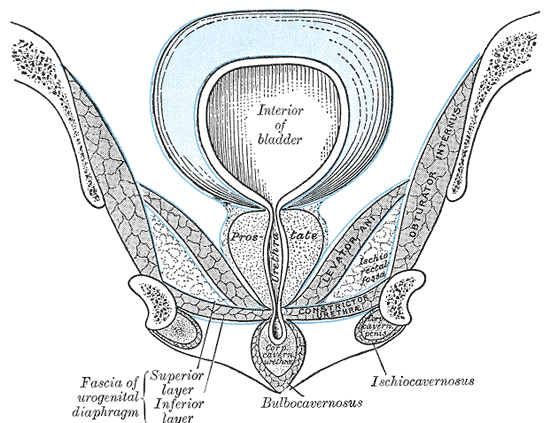
- Coronal section of anterior part of pelvis, through the pubic arch. Seen from in front.

Details
- Origin: Ischial tuberosity
- Insertion: Crus of penis (male) or crus of clitoris (female)
- Artery: Perineal artery
- Nerve: Pudendal nerve
- Actions: Maintains penile erection (male) or clitoral erection (female)

Identifiers
- Latin: musculus ischiocavernosus
- TA98: A09.5.02.004
- TA2: 2417
- FMA: 19730

The ischiocavernosus muscle (erectores penis or erector clitoridis in older texts) is a muscle just below the surface of the perineum, present in both men and women.

== Structure ==
It arises by tendinous and fleshy fibers from the inner surface of the tuberosity of the ischium, behind the crus penis; and from the inferior pubic rami and ischium on either side of the crus.

From these points fleshy fibers succeed, and end in an aponeurosis which is inserted into the sides and under surface of the crus penis.

== Function ==
The ischiocavernosus muscle assists with erection in male placental mammals, it helps to stabilize the erect penis by compressing the crus penis and retarding the return of blood through the veins.

== Additional images ==
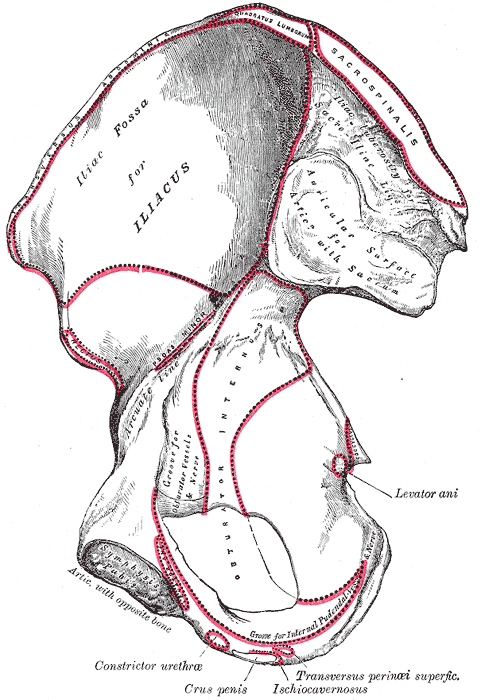
Right hip bone, internal surface

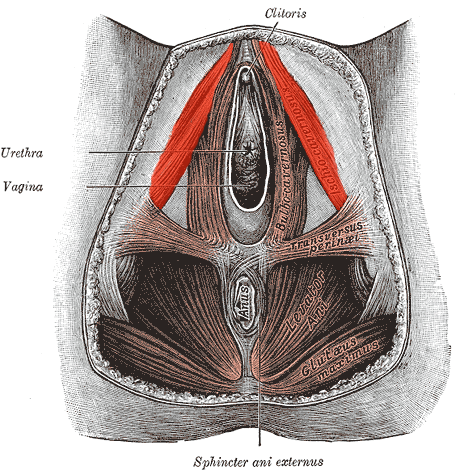
Muscles of the female perineum (ischiocavernosus visible at upper left)

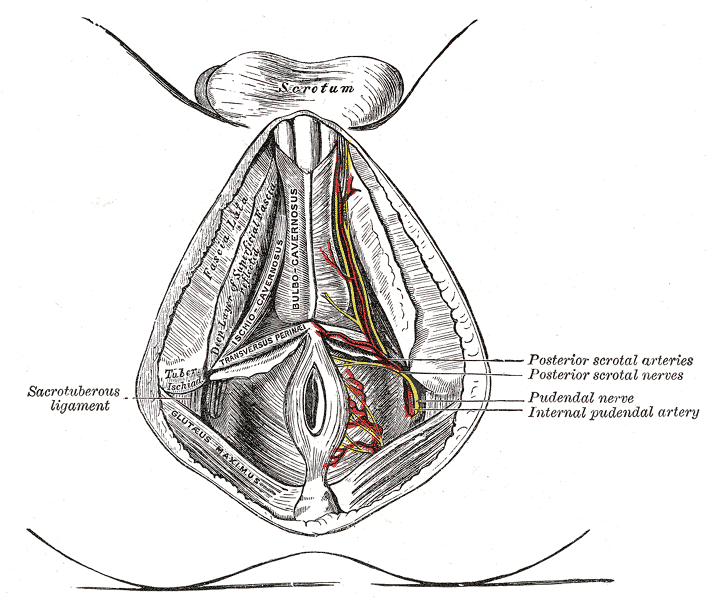
The superficial branches of the internal pudendal artery
