= Deep dorsal vein of clitoris =

Details
- Drains from: Clitoris
- Drains to: Vesical plexus
- Artery: Dorsal artery of clitoris

Identifiers
- Latin: vena dorsalis profunda clitoridis
- TA98: A12.3.10.014F
- TA2: 5040
- FMA: 77504

The deep dorsal vein of clitoris is a vein which drains to the vesical plexus.
