= Cerobasis nigra =

Scientific classification
- Kingdom: Animalia
- Phylum: Arthropoda
- Clade: Pancrustacea
- Class: Insecta
- Order: Psocodea
- Family: Trogiidae
- Genus: Cerobasis
- Species: C. nigra

Binomial name
- Cerobasis nigra Lienhard, 1996

Species of booklouse

Cerobasis nigra is a species of Psocoptera from the Trogiidae family that is endemic to Madeira.
