= Cerobasis canariensis =

Scientific classification
- Kingdom: Animalia
- Phylum: Arthropoda
- Clade: Pancrustacea
- Class: Insecta
- Order: Psocodea
- Family: Trogiidae
- Genus: Cerobasis
- Species: C. canariensis

Binomial name
- Cerobasis canariensis (Enderlein, 1910)

Species of booklouse

Cerobasis canariensis is a species of Psocoptera from the Trogiidae family that can be found on Canary Islands and in Germany.
