= Animal clitoris =

Female sex organ in animals

The clitoris (/ˈklɪtərɪs/ or /klɪˈtɔːrɪs/; pl.: clitorises or clitorides) is a female sex organ ancestrally present in amniotes, being found in living mammals and most reptiles, though it has not been unambiguously found in adult birds or snakes (though it is present in birds during early development).

Although the clitoris exists in all mammal species, most studies deal with the human clitoris - few detailed studies of the anatomy of the clitoris in non-humans exist. The clitoris is especially developed in fossas, apes, lemurs, moles, and, like the penis in many non-human placental mammals, often contains a small bone. In females, this bone is known as the os clitoridis. The clitoris exists in turtles, ratites, crocodiles, and in species of birds in which the male counterpart has a penis. The hemiclitoris is one-half of a paired structure in lizards. Some intersex female bears mate and give birth through the tip of the clitoris; these species are grizzly bears, brown bears, American black bears and polar bears. Although the bears have been described as having "a birth canal that runs through the clitoris rather than forming a separate vagina" (a feature that is estimated to make up 10 to 20 percent of the bears' population), scientists state that female spotted hyenas are the only non-intersex female mammals devoid of an external vaginal opening, and whose sexual anatomy is distinct from usual intersex cases.

== Non-human primates ==
In spider monkeys, the clitoris is especially developed and has an interior passage, or urethra, that makes it almost identical to the penis, and it retains and distributes urine droplets as the female spider monkey moves around. Scholar Alan F. Dixson stated that this urine "is voided at the bases of the clitoris, flows down the shallow groove on its perineal surface, and is held by the skin folds on each side of the groove". Because spider monkeys of South America have pendulous and erectile clitorises long enough to be mistaken for a penis, researchers and observers of the species look for a scrotum to determine the animal's sex; a similar approach is to identify scent-marking glands that may also be present on the clitoris.

The clitoris erects in squirrel monkeys during dominance displays, which indirectly influences the squirrel monkeys' reproductive success.

The clitoris of bonobos is larger and more externalized than in most mammals; Natalie Angier said that a young adolescent "female bonobo is maybe half the weight of a human teenager, but her clitoris is three times bigger than the human equivalent, and visible enough to waggle unmistakably as she walks". Female bonobos often engage in the practice of genital-genital (GG) rubbing. Ethologist Jonathan Balcombe stated that female bonobos rub their clitorises together rapidly for ten to twenty seconds, and this behavior, "which may be repeated in rapid succession, is usually accompanied by grinding, shrieking, and clitoral engorgement"; he added that, on average, they engage in this practice "about once every two hours", and as bonobos sometimes mate face-to-face, "evolutionary biologist Marlene Zuk has suggested that the position of the clitoris in bonobos and some other primates has evolved to maximize stimulation during sexual intercourse".

Many strepsirrhine species exhibit elongated clitorises that are either fully or partially tunneled by the urethra, including mouse lemurs, dwarf lemurs, all Eulemur species, lorises and galagos. Some of these species also exhibit a membrane seal across the vagina that closes the vaginal opening during the non-mating seasons, most notably mouse and dwarf lemurs. The clitoral morphology of the ring-tailed lemur is the most well-studied. They are described as having "elongated, pendulous clitorises that are [fully] tunneled by a urethra". The urethra is surrounded by erectile tissue, which allows for significant swelling during breeding seasons, but this erectile tissue differs from the typical male corpus spongiosum. Non-pregnant adult ring-tailed females do not show higher testosterone levels than males, but they do exhibit higher A_{4} and estrogen levels during seasonal aggression. During pregnancy, estrogen, A_{4}, and testosterone levels are raised, but female fetuses are still "protected" from excess testosterone. These "masculinized" genitalia are often found alongside other traits, such as female-dominated social groups, reduced sexual dimorphism that makes females the same size as males, and even ratios of sexes in adult populations. This phenomenon that has been dubbed the "lemur syndrome". A 2014 study of Eulemur masculinization proposed that behavioral and morphological masculinization in female Lemuriformes is an ancestral trait that likely emerged after their split from Lorisiformes.

== Spotted hyenas ==
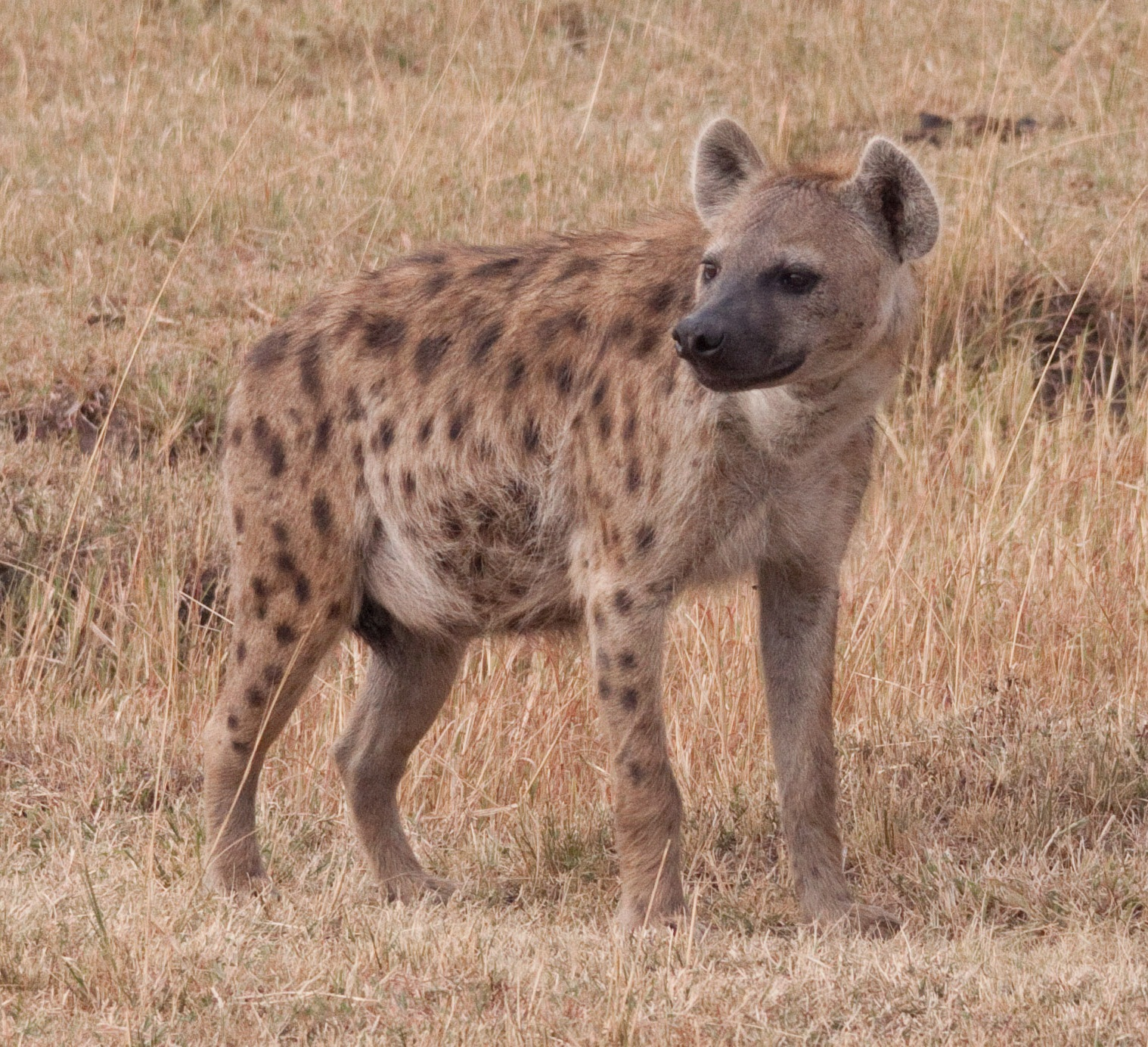
With a urogenital system in which the female urinates, mates and gives birth via an enlarged, erectile clitoris, female spotted hyenas are the only female mammals devoid of an external vaginal opening.

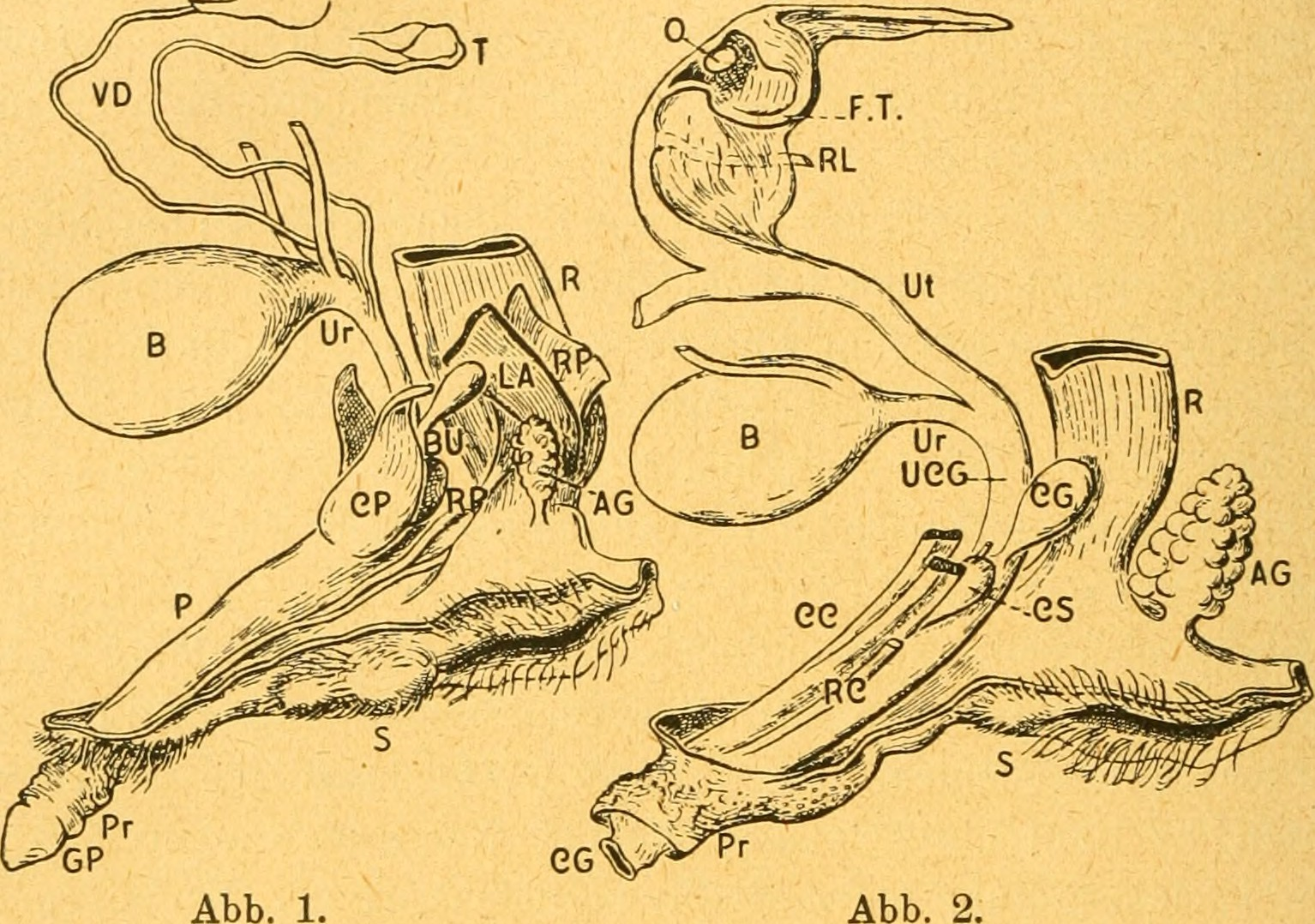
Male and female reproductive systems of the spotted hyena, from Schmotzer & Zimmerman, Anatomischer Anzeiger (1922). Abb. 1 (Fig. 1.) Male reproductive anatomy. Abb. 2 (Fig. 2.) Female reproductive anatomy. Principal abbreviations (from Schmotzer & Zimmerman) are: T, testis; VD, vas deferens; BU, bulbus urethrae; Ur, urethra; R, rectum; P, penis; S, scrotum; O, ovarium; FT, tuba Fallopii; RL, ligamentum uteri; Ut, uterus; CC, corpus clitoridis. Remaining abbreviations, in alphabetical order, are: AG, glandula analis; B, vesica urinaria; CG, glandula Cowperi; CP, corpus penis; CS, corpus spongiosum; GC, glans clitoridis; GP, glans penis; LA, musculus levator ani; Pr, praeputium; RC, musculus retractor clitoridis; RP, musculus retractor penis; UCG, canalis urogenitalis.

While female spotted hyenas were sometimes referred to as pseudohermaphrodites and scientists of ancient and later historical times believed that they were hermaphrodites, modern scientists do not refer to them as such. That designation is typically reserved for those who simultaneously exhibit features of both sexes; the genetic makeup of female spotted hyenas "are clearly distinct" from male spotted hyenas.

Female spotted hyenas have a clitoris 90 percent as long and the same diameter as a male penis (171 millimetres long and 22 millimetres in diameter), and this pseudo-penis' formation seems largely androgen-independent because it appears in the female fetus before differentiation of the fetal ovary and adrenal gland. The spotted hyenas have a highly erectile clitoris, complete with a false scrotum; author John C. Wingfield stated that "the resemblance to male genitalia is so close that sex can be determined with confidence only by palpation of the scrotum". The pseudo-penis can also be distinguished from the males' genitalia by its greater thickness and more rounded glans. The female possesses no external vagina, as the labia are fused to form a pseudo-scrotum. In the females, this scrotum consists of soft adipose tissue. Like male spotted hyenas with regard to their penises, the female spotted hyenas have small spines on the head of their clitorises, which scholar Catherine Blackledge said makes "the clitoris tip feel like soft sandpaper". She added that the clitoris "extends away from the body in a sleek and slender arc, measuring, on average, over 17 cm from root to tip. Just like a penis, [it] is fully erectile, raising its head in hyena greeting ceremonies, social displays, games of rough and tumble or when sniffing out peers".

Due to their higher levels of androgen exposure during fetal development, the female hyenas are significantly more muscular and aggressive than their male counterparts; social-wise, they are of higher rank than the males, being dominant or dominant and alpha, and the females who have been exposed to higher levels of androgen than average become higher-ranking than their female peers. Subordinate females lick the clitorises of higher-ranked females as a sign of submission and obedience, but females also lick each other's clitorises as a greeting or to strengthen social bonds; in contrast, while all males lick the clitorises of dominant females, the females will not lick the penises of males because males are considered to be of lowest rank.

The female spotted hyenas urinate, copulate and give birth through the clitoris since the urethra and vagina exit through the clitoral glans. This trait makes mating more laborious for the male than in other mammals, and also makes attempts to sexually coerce (physically force sexual activity on) females futile. Joan Roughgarden, an ecologist and evolutionary biologist, said that because the hyena's clitoris is higher on the belly than the vagina in most mammals, the male hyena "must slide his rear under the female when mating so that his penis lines up with [her clitoris]". In an action similar to pushing up a shirtsleeve, the "female retracts the [pseudo-penis] on itself, and creates an opening into which the male inserts his own penis". The male must practice this act, which can take a couple of months to successfully perform. Female spotted hyenas exposed to larger doses of androgen have significantly damaged ovaries, making it difficult to conceive. After giving birth, the pseudo-penis is stretched and loses much of its original aspects; it becomes a slack-walled and reduced prepuce with an enlarged orifice with split lips. Approximately 15% of the females die during their first time giving birth, and over 60% of their species' firstborn young die.

A 2006 Baskin et al. study concluded, "The basic anatomical structures of the corporeal bodies in both sexes of humans and spotted hyenas were similar. As in humans, the dorsal nerve distribution was unique in being devoid of nerves at the 12 o'clock position in the penis and clitoris of the spotted hyena" and that "[d]orsal nerves of the penis/clitoris in humans and male spotted hyenas tracked along both sides of the corporeal body to the corpus spongiosum at the 5 and 7 o'clock positions. The dorsal nerves penetrated the corporeal body and distally the glans in the hyena", and in female hyenas, "the dorsal nerves fanned out laterally on the clitoral body. Glans morphology was different in appearance in both sexes, being wide and blunt in the female and tapered in the male".

== Moles ==
Many species of talpid moles exhibit peniform clitorises that are tunneled by the urethra and are found to have erectile tissue, most notably species from the Talpa genus found in Europe. Unique to this clade are the presence of ovotestes, wherein the female ovary also is mostly made up of sterile testicular tissue that secretes testosterone with only a small portion of the gonad containing ovarian tissue. Genetic studies have revealed that females of these species have an XX genotype and do not have any translocated Y-linked genes. Detailed developmental studies of Talpa occidentalis have revealed that the female gonads develop in a "testis-like pattern". DMRT1, a gene that regulates development of Sertoli cells, was found to be expressed in female germ cells before meiosis, however no Sertoli cells were present in the fully-developed ovotestes. Additionally, the female germ cells only enter meiosis postnatally, a phenomenon that has not been found in any other eutherian mammal. Phylogenetic analyses have suggested that, like in lemuroids, this trait must have evolved in a common ancestor of the clade, and has been "turned off and on" in different talpid lineages.

Female European moles are highly territorial and will not allow males in to their territory outside of breeding season, the probable cause of this behavior being the high levels of testosterone secreted by the female ovotestes. During the non-breeding season, their vaginal opening is covered by skin, akin to the condition seen in mouse and dwarf lemurs.

== Domestic cats ==
Researchers studying the peripheral and central afferent pathways from the feline clitoris concluded that "afferent neurons projecting to the clitoris of the cat were identified by WGA-HRP tracing in the S1 and S2 dorsal root ganglia. An average of 433 cells were identified on each side of the animal. 85 percent and 15 percent of the labeled cells were located in the S1 and S2 dorsal root ganglia, respectively. The average cross sectional area of clitoral afferent neuron profiles was 1.479±627 μm2." They also stated that light "constant pressure on the clitoris produced an initial burst of single unit firing (maximum frequencies 170–255 Hz) followed by rapid adaptation and a sustained firing (maximum 40 Hz), which was maintained during the stimulation" and that further examination of tonic firing "indicate that the clitoris is innervated by mechano-sensitive myelinated afferent fibers in the pudental nerve which project centrally to the region of the dorsal commissure in the L7-S1 spinal cord".

== Sheep ==
The external phenotype and reproductive behavior of 21 freemartin sheep and two male pseudo-intersex sheep were recorded with the aim of identifying any characteristics that could predict a failure to breed. The vagina's length and the size and shape of the vulva and its clitoris were among the aspects analyzed. While the study reported that "a number of physical and behavioural abnormalities were detected," it also concluded that "the only consistent finding in all 23 animals was a short vagina which varied in length from 3.1 to 7.0 cm, compared with 10 to 14 cm in normal animals."

== Mice ==
In a study concerning the clitoral structure of mice, the mouse perineal urethra was documented as being surrounded by erectile tissue forming the bulbs of the clitoris. The researchers stated, "In the mouse, as in human females, tissue organization in the corpora cavernosa of the clitoris is essentially similar to that of the penis except for the absence of a subalbugineal layer interposed between the tunica albuginea and the erectile tissue."
