= Cerobasis denticulata =

Scientific classification
- Kingdom: Animalia
- Phylum: Arthropoda
- Clade: Pancrustacea
- Class: Insecta
- Order: Psocodea
- Family: Trogiidae
- Genus: Cerobasis
- Species: C. denticulata

Binomial name
- Cerobasis denticulata Lienhard, 1996

Species of booklouse

Cerobasis denticulata is a species of Psocoptera from the Trogiidae family that is endemic to the Canary Islands.
