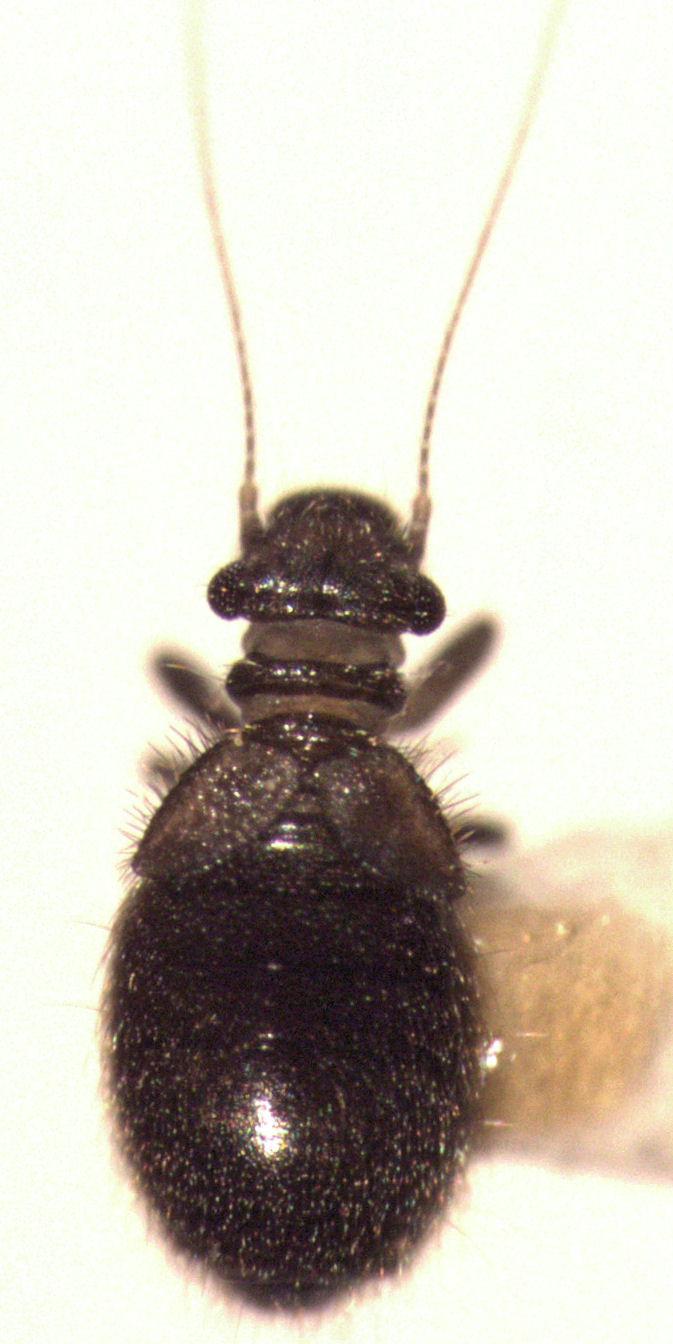

Scientific classification
- Kingdom: Animalia
- Phylum: Arthropoda
- Clade: Pancrustacea
- Class: Insecta
- Order: Psocodea
- Family: Trogiidae
- Genus: Lepinotus
- Species: L. reticulatus

Binomial name
- Lepinotus reticulatus Enderlein, 1904

= Lepinotus reticulatus =

Species of booklouse

Lepinotus reticulatus, known generally as the reticulate-winged trogiid or reticulate-winged booklouse, is a species of granary booklouse in the family Trogiidae. It is found in Africa, Australia, Europe and Northern Asia (excluding China), Central America, North America, Oceania, South America, and Southern Asia.
