= Pseudo-penis =

Anatomical structure resembling a penis

A pseudo-penis is any structure found on an animal that, while appearing to be a penis, is derived from a different developmental path.

== Mammals ==
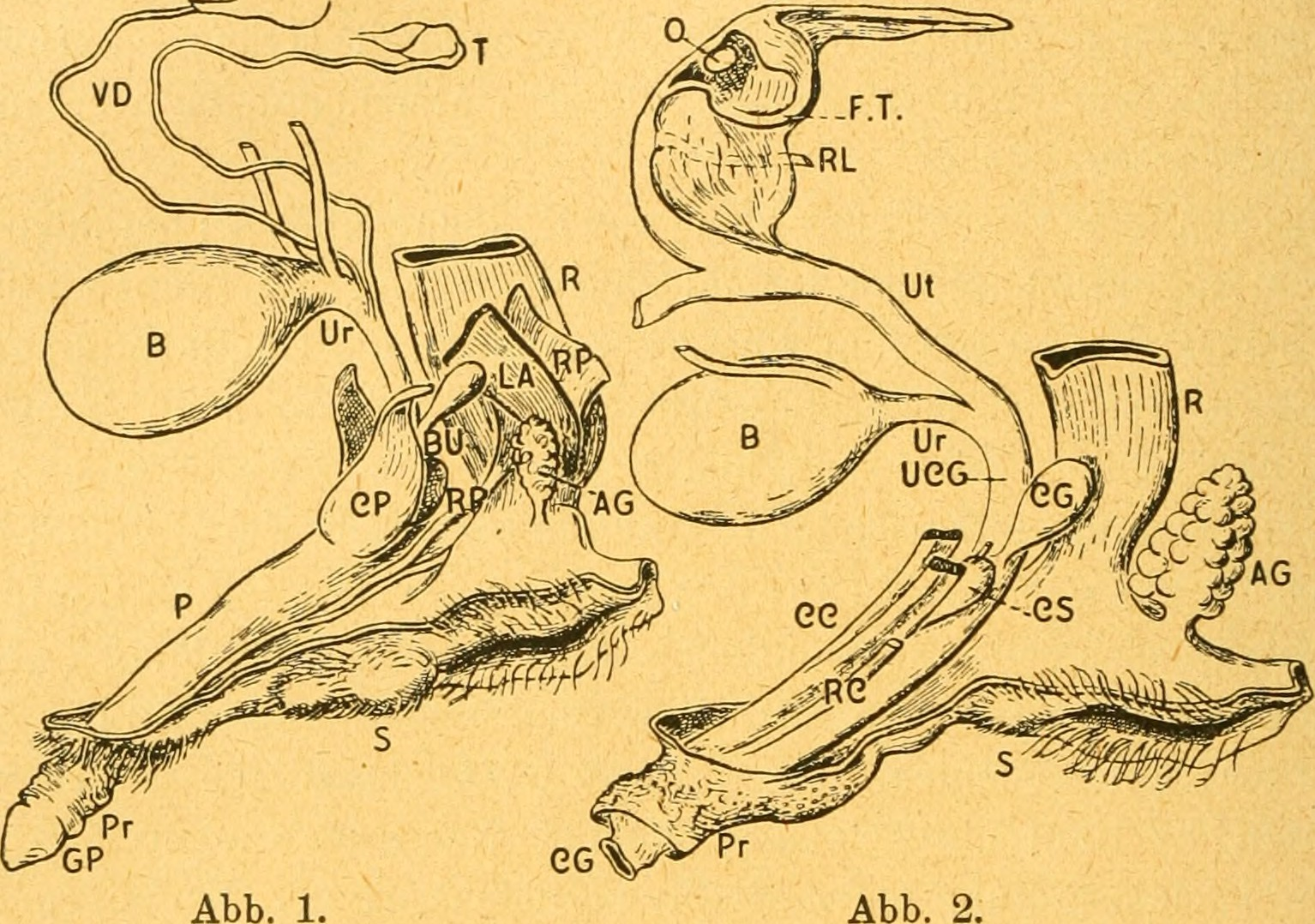
Male and female reproductive systems of the spotted hyena

In mammals, all intact developmentally typical males have a penis, but the clitoris in the females of the following species is sufficiently enlarged that it is usually termed a pseudo-penis: spotted hyena, juvenile fossa, elephants, binturong, lemur and spider monkey. The fossa's enlarged clitoris is supported by an os clitoridis, a bone similar to the male's os penis. The juvenile female fossa's os clitoridis and pseudo-penis shrink as she grows, unlike that of other pseudo-penis species.

The mammalian pseudo-penis appears to be simply for display, though the spotted hyena is an exception: the female spotted hyena urinates, copulates, and gives birth through her pseudo-penis. This prevents males from mating without the full co-operation of females, which means that mating preferences of the female are predominant.

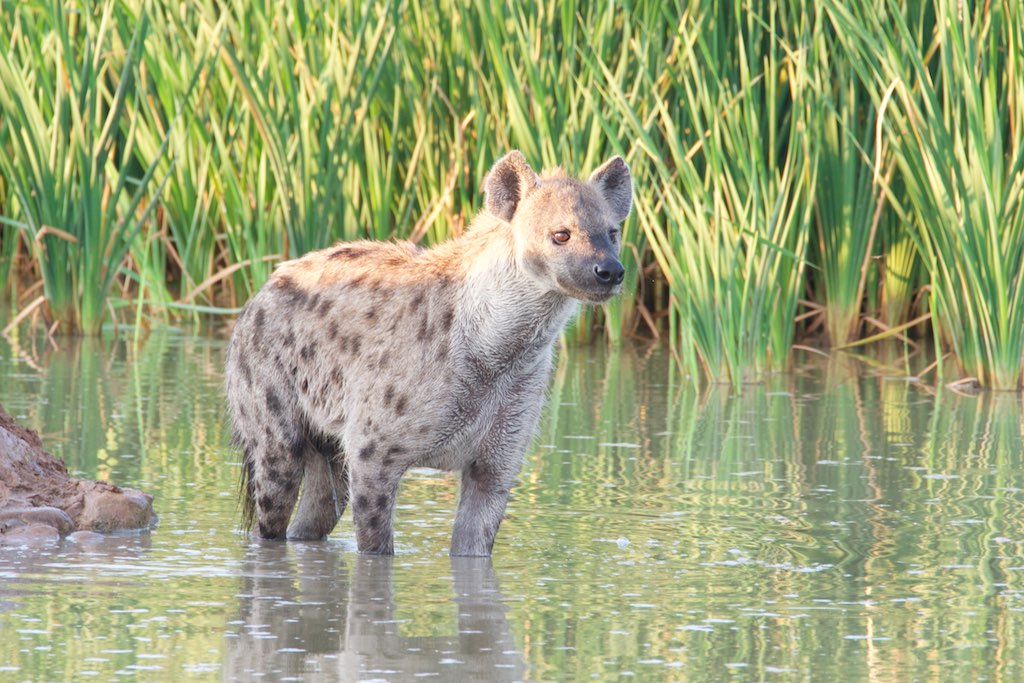
Female spotted hyenas urinate through a pseudo-penis.

Spotted hyenas are a matriarchal society, where adult females dominate adult males and are also more aggressive than males. When a male hyena leaves his natal clan, he behaves submissively to all newly encountered hyenas; as a result, when he settles down with a new clan as a breeding male, he is submissive to all natal clan members. It was hypothesized that the male hyena erected his penis to show submissiveness. During greetings, hyenas would stand parallel to each other and sniff or lick the erect penis or anal scent gland.

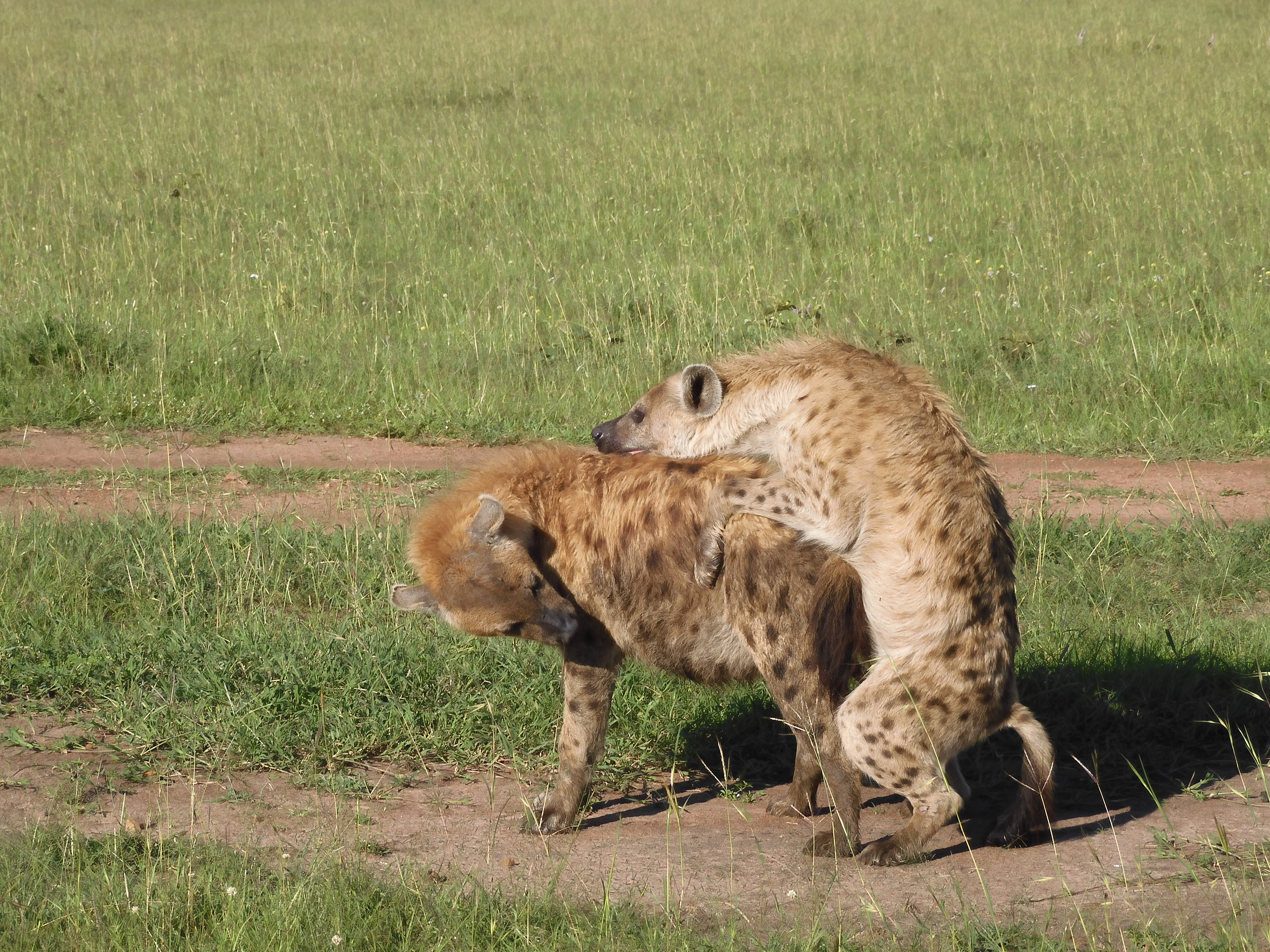
The male spotted hyena inserts his penis into the female's pseudo-penis during copulation.

The spotted hyena's pseudo-penis has severe reproductive costs. Nearly all of her first-born cubs are stillborn, as the placenta is not long enough for the extended penile birth canal. In addition, the first birthing process is time-consuming, as it requires the meatus of the pseudo-penis to tear, allowing the fetus to pass through; as a result, the first-born often die of hypoxia.

The female spider monkey has a clitoris that is called a pseudo-penis because it is especially developed and has a shallow perineal groove that retains and distributes urine droplets as she moves around. The clitoris of female Geoffroy's spider monkeys is large and protrudes, looking like a penis. This organ, called a pendulous clitoris because of the way it dangles externally, is actually larger than the male flaccid penis. As a result, females are sometimes mistaken for males by human observers. The enlarged clitoris is believed to aid males in determining sexual receptiveness, allowing them to touch the clitoris and smell their fingers to pick up chemical or olfactory cues to the female's reproductive status.

== Birds ==
Only 3% of avian species have a phallus. The most common genitalia among birds is the cloaca; a direct tract for elimination and reproduction in both of the sexes. Certain bird species, such as the ratites, screamers, waterfowl, and cracids (a family of arboreal galliformes) exhibit a phallus in males. A notable example of a bird with a pseudo-penis is the red-billed buffalo weaver, which do not use their pseudo-penis for direct insertion during copulation; however it does play a part in successful mating and stimulation. Similarly to the red-billed buffalo weaver, the cassowary, a ratite, exhibits a pseudo-penis in both males and females. The male's pseudo-phallus is used to "invaginate", or to push the female's pseudo-phallus inside-out, and then ejaculates from the cloaca to ensure a successful mating.

== Insects ==
The only known example of a pseudo-penis to occur in the insects is found in the barklouse genus Neotrogla. In this genus, the pseudo-penis plays a part in their rarely-seen sexual reversal. In this case, the male has a vagina-like structure while the female has a pseudo-penis. Some may be confused, wondering why the individuals with a vagina-like structure are considered male while the ones with the pseudo-penis are considered female. This is because even though they have visible outer structures of the opposite sex, their inner structures are consistent to their sex. More important, the males produce sperm and the females produce eggs.

Females have a penis-like structure, called the gynosome that has a tube leading into their body to where their genitalia are located. Neotrogla males have a structure resembling that of a vagina. However, on the inside of their body, they have male genitalia. When the female inserts her organ into the male, the tip of the pseudo penis inflates. When this tip inflates, species specific ridges and spines flare up that match up with the walls of the male's genital chamber. This serves two functions, to stimulate the male's reproductive organs, and to keep the male and female locked together. After they have been locked together, the only way to get the two to part would be to rip off the abdomen of the male. During the lengthy, 40- to 70-hour copulation process, these male genitalia structures ejaculate inside of the male's body. The sperm is then deposited into the female's structure and then travels through a spermathecal duct to where it can fertilize the eggs.

== Possible role of androstenedione ==
Androstenedione is a hormone that is converted to testosterone by enzymatic activity. It is theorized that the dominance and morphological phenotype of a pseudo-penis observed in female hyenas is due to the presence of prenatal and postnatal androstenedione levels. Prenatal androgen levels dictate genitalia differences between male and female. Higher levels of androgen are observed in the second half of gestation which is theorized to cause masculinization in terms of dominance and aggression in hyenas. Large amounts of androstenedione are produced in hyena ovarian tissues with little aromatase activity allowing the placenta to convert androstenedione to testosterone. High concentrations of androgens is theorized to virilize the female hyena genitalia and kill ovarian follicles. Postnatal androgen levels dictate growth in genitalia during puberty. Postnatal androgen levels are higher in females than males when they are younger; especially in infancy. These high levels of androstenedione contribute to aggression and dominance and the masculinization of genitalia during puberty.

== See also ==
- Clitoromegaly
- Pseudohermaphroditism
- Sexual mimicry
