= Cerobasis insularis =

Scientific classification
- Kingdom: Animalia
- Phylum: Arthropoda
- Clade: Pancrustacea
- Class: Insecta
- Order: Psocodea
- Family: Trogiidae
- Genus: Cerobasis
- Species: C. insularis

Binomial name
- Cerobasis insularis Lienhard, 1996

Species of booklouse

Cerobasis insularis is a species of Psocoptera from the Trogiidae family that is endemic to the Canary Islands.
