= Cerobasis harteni =

Scientific classification
- Kingdom: Animalia
- Phylum: Arthropoda
- Clade: Pancrustacea
- Class: Insecta
- Order: Psocodea
- Family: Trogiidae
- Genus: Cerobasis
- Species: C. harteni

Binomial name
- Cerobasis harteni Lienhard, 1984

Species of booklouse

Cerobasis harteni is a species of Psocoptera from the Trogiidae family that can be found in the Azores and North Africa.
