= Cerobasis annulata =

Scientific classification
- Domain: Eukaryota
- Kingdom: Animalia
- Phylum: Arthropoda
- Class: Insecta
- Order: Psocodea
- Family: Trogiidae
- Genus: Cerobasis
- Species: C. annulata

Binomial name
- Cerobasis annulata (Hagen, 1865)

Synonyms
- Clothilla annulata Hagen, 1865

Species of booklouse

Cerobasis annulata is a species of Psocoptera from Trogiidae family that can be found in Austria, Azores, Belgium, Cyprus, France, Germany, Great Britain, Greece, Italy, Luxembourg, Madeira, Norway, Poland, Portugal, Switzerland, and the Netherlands.
