= Cerobasis rosae =

Scientific classification
- Kingdom: Animalia
- Phylum: Arthropoda
- Clade: Pancrustacea
- Class: Insecta
- Order: Psocodea
- Family: Trogiidae
- Genus: Cerobasis
- Species: C. rosae

Binomial name
- Cerobasis rosae Baz, 1993

Species of booklouse

Cerobasis rosae is a species of Psocoptera from the Trogiidae family that is endemic to Canary Islands.
