= Cerobasis pineticola =

Scientific classification
- Kingdom: Animalia
- Phylum: Arthropoda
- Clade: Pancrustacea
- Class: Insecta
- Order: Psocodea
- Family: Trogiidae
- Genus: Cerobasis
- Species: C. pineticola

Binomial name
- Cerobasis pineticola Baz, 1991

Species of booklouse

Cerobasis pineticola is a species of Psocoptera from the Trogiidae family that is endemic to Canary Islands.
