= Sensitibilla =

Scientific classification
- Kingdom: Animalia
- Phylum: Arthropoda
- Clade: Pancrustacea
- Class: Insecta
- Order: Psocodea
- Family: Prionoglarididae
- Genus: Sensitibilla; Lienhard, 2007

Species
- Sensitibilla brandbergensis Lienhard, 2007; Sensitibilla etosha Lienhard & Holusa, 2010; Sensitibilla roessingensis Lienhard, 2007; Sensitibilla strinatii Lienhard, 2000

Genus of booklice

Sensitibilla is an African genus of large-winged psocids in the family Prionoglarididae, discovered and described by Charles Lienhard. It contains four species.
