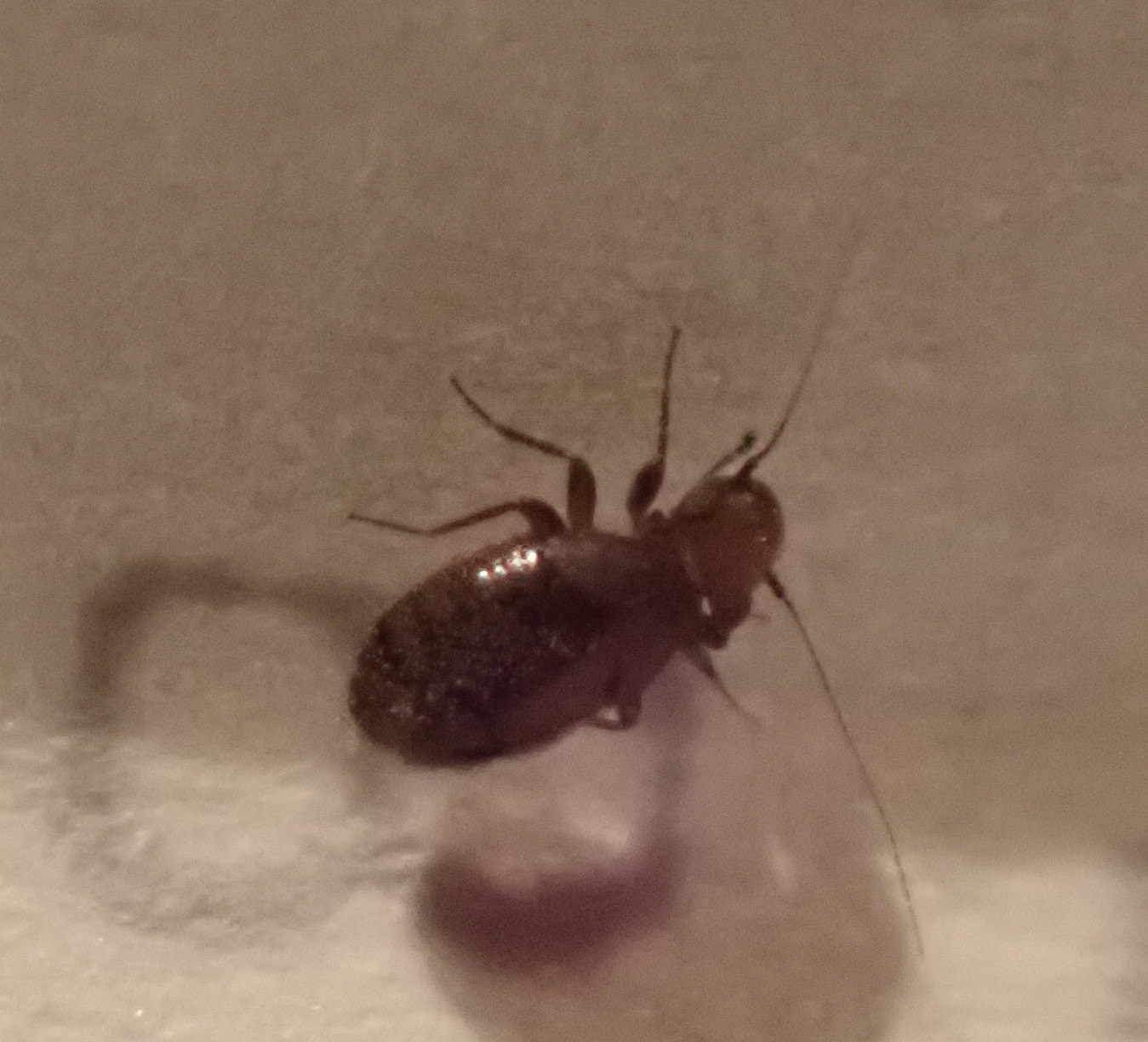

Scientific classification
- Domain: Eukaryota
- Kingdom: Animalia
- Phylum: Arthropoda
- Class: Insecta
- Order: Psocodea
- Family: Trogiidae
- Genus: Lepinotus
- Species: L. patruelis

Binomial name
- Lepinotus patruelis Pearman, 1931

= Lepinotus patruelis =

Species of booklouse

Lepinotus patruelis is a brown coloured species of Psocoptera from the family Stenopsocidae that can be found in Great Britain, Ireland, and Scotland. Besides the Britain I., it can also be found in Austria, Benelux, Finland, France, Germany, Italy, Switzerland and Scandinavia (except Denmark).

== Habitat ==
Lepinotus patruelis is one of the most abundant psocids in places where food is stored, such as grain silos, transit sheds, warehouses and breweries. They aggregate around organic material (e.g. wheat dust) on which they feed.

This species also occurs outdoors, but rarely. It has been found on trunks of deciduous trees, on branches of conifers (Chinese juniper and pine), in sieved tidal debris and under stone in cow byre.

== Behaviour ==
Lepinotus patruelis moves and feeds during both day and night; this would make it a cathemeral species.

When an individual L. patruelis is hungry, it wanders in search of food, which it locates with the help of its labium. When food is located, it feeds using forelegs and mandibles. It feeds for longer if it has been starved for at least two days compared to a shorter period of starvation. Feeding continues until the individual's midgut is distended, after which it becomes inactive, sometimes for as long as two hours.

The courtship behaviour of L. patruelis differs from what conventional sex role theory predicts. Males show active mate choice and may reject females. This happens more often in groups with a female-biased sex ratio than a male-biased sex ratio, and more often when males are fed a high-quality diet than a low-quality diet. Females show no overt signs of mate choice. Both sexes compete for access to mates and attempt to interfere with mounted pairs.

== Predators ==
Several spiders are known to prey on L. patruelis, including Tegenaria domestica and an unspecified jumping spider.
