= Siamoglaris =

Scientific classification
- Kingdom: Animalia
- Phylum: Arthropoda
- Clade: Pancrustacea
- Class: Insecta
- Order: Psocodea
- Family: Prionoglarididae
- Genus: Siamoglaris; Lienhard, 2004

Genus of booklice

Siamoglaris is a genus of psocids in the family Prionoglarididae, the only one in the Indomalayan realm.
