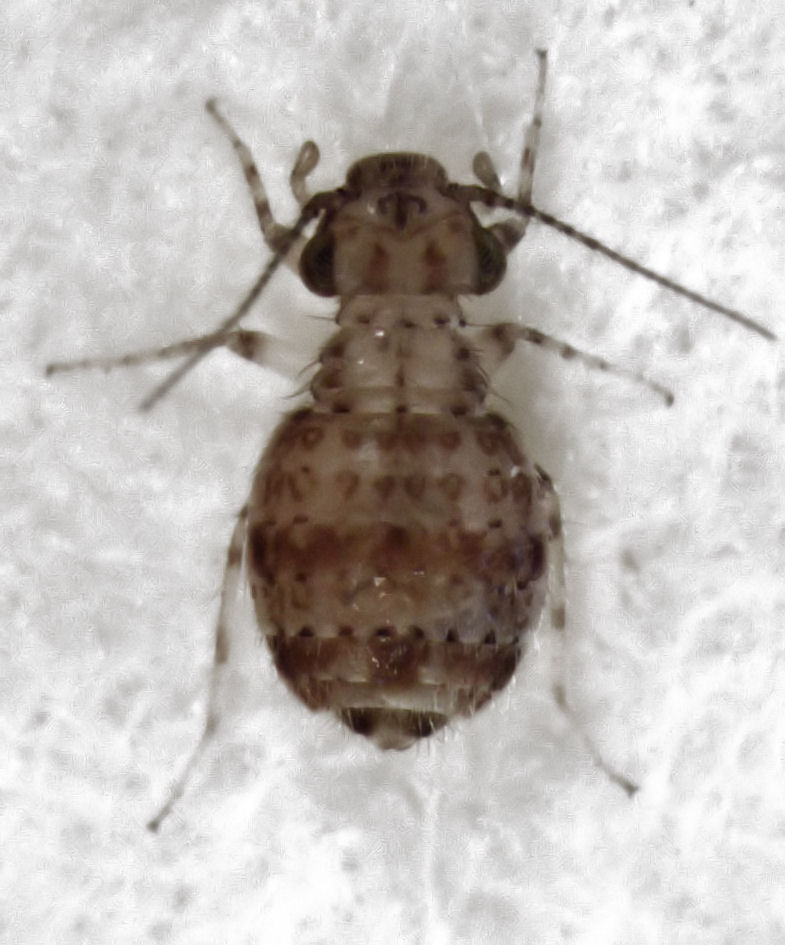
- Cerobasis guestfalica (adult), length about 1.5 mm

Scientific classification
- Domain: Eukaryota
- Kingdom: Animalia
- Phylum: Arthropoda
- Class: Insecta
- Order: Psocodea
- Family: Trogiidae
- Genus: Cerobasis
- Species: C. guestfalica

Binomial name
- Cerobasis guestfalica (Kolbe, 1880)

Synonyms
- Cerobasis guestfalicus; Cerobasis muraria Kolbe, 1882; Hyperetes guestfalicus Kolbe, 1880; Hyperetes tessulatus Hagen, 1883; Tichobia alternans Kolbe, 1882

= Cerobasis guestfalica =

Species of booklouse

Cerobasis guestfalica is a species of Psocoptera belonging to the family Trogiidae. It is widespread in the world.
