= Speleopsocus =

Scientific classification
- Kingdom: Animalia
- Phylum: Arthropoda
- Clade: Pancrustacea
- Class: Insecta
- Order: Psocodea
- Family: Prionoglarididae
- Genus: Speleopsocus; Lienhard, 2010

Genus of booklice

Speleopsocus is a genus of psocids (booklice) in the family Prionoglarididae from the Tepui of Venezuela. It is monotypic, containing only one species, Speleopsocus chimanta.
