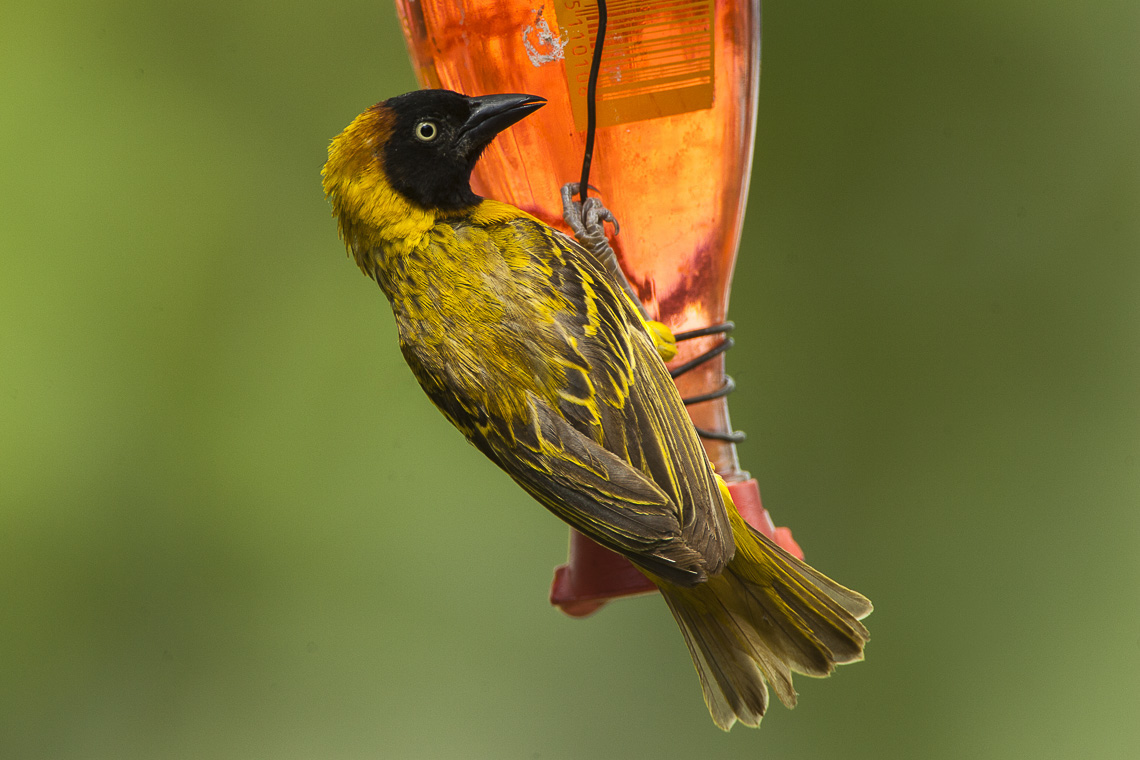
- Male P. i. intermedius, Kenya
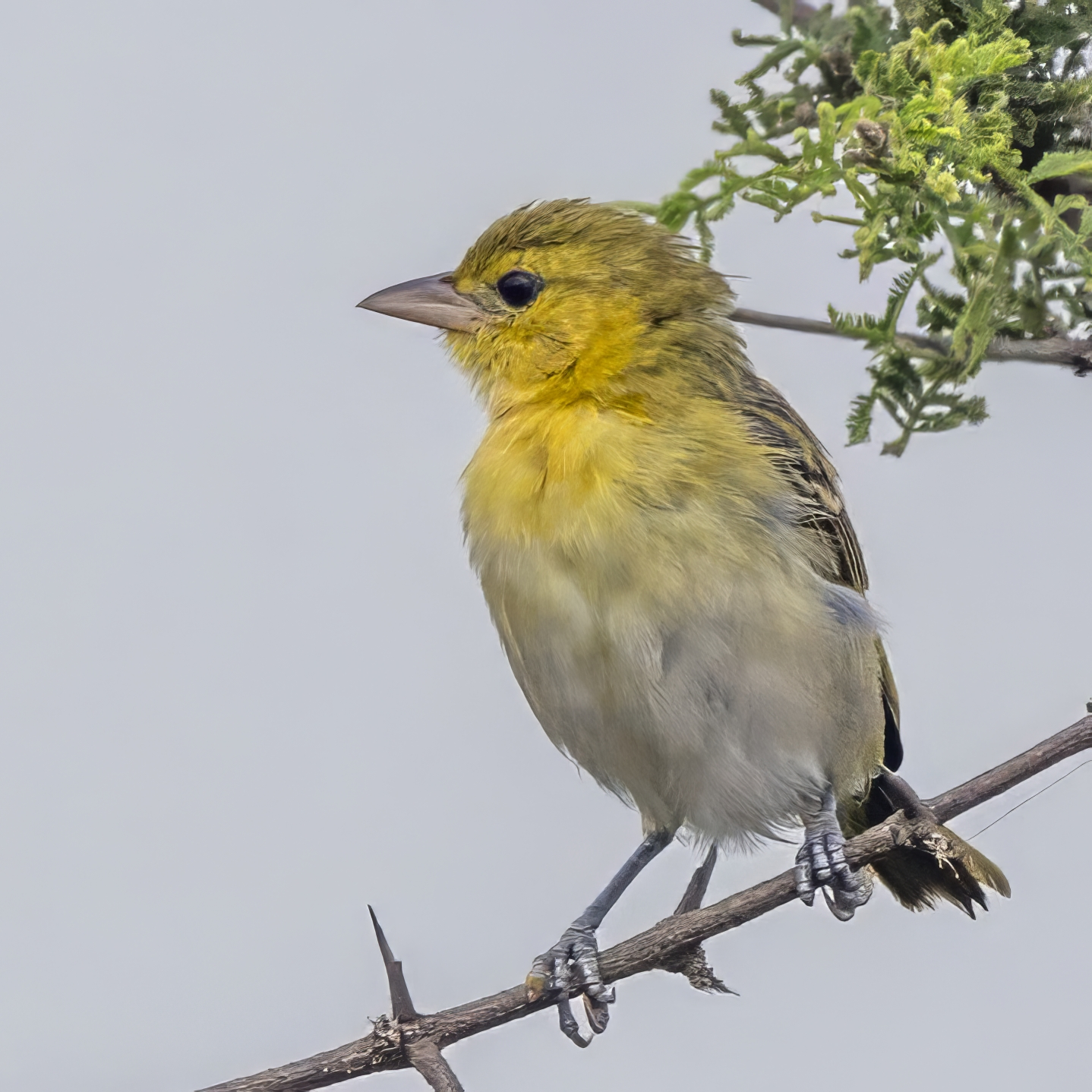
- Female P. i. cabanisii, South Africa

Conservation status
- Least Concern (IUCN 3.1)

Scientific classification
- Kingdom: Animalia
- Phylum: Chordata
- Class: Aves
- Order: Passeriformes
- Family: Ploceidae
- Genus: Ploceus
- Species: P. intermedius

Binomial name
- Ploceus intermedius Rüppell, 1845

= Lesser masked weaver =

Species of bird

The lesser masked weaver (Ploceus intermedius) is a species of bird in the family Ploceidae. It builds its nests in large colonies, often alongside the village weaver and sometimes the red-billed buffalo weaver. This species is commonly parasitised by the Diederik cuckoo. It is found in eastern, south-eastern and southern Africa.

== Taxonomy and systematics ==
There are two subspecies:

- P. i. intermedius Rüppell, 1845 – From Djibouti to central Tanzania
- P. i. cabanisii (W. K. H. Peters, 1868) – African west coast and southern Africa

Synonyms are P. i. beattyi in Angola and P. i. luebberti in Namibia
