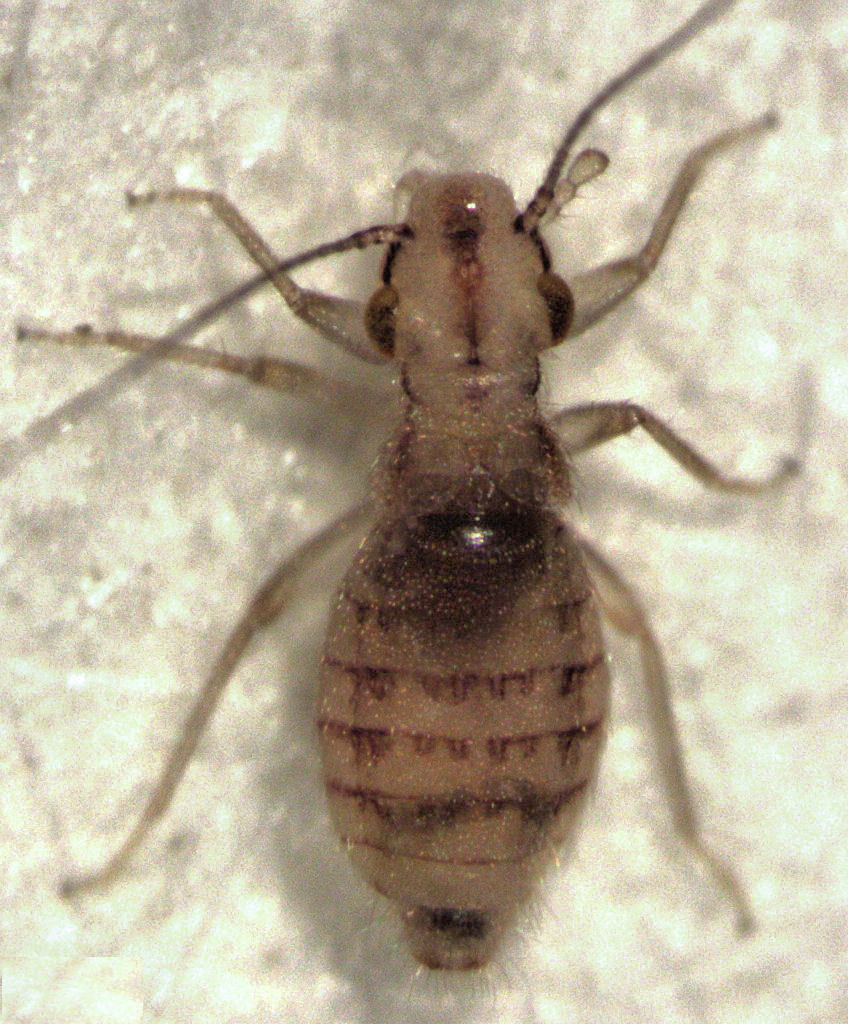

Scientific classification
- Kingdom: Animalia
- Phylum: Arthropoda
- Class: Insecta
- Order: Psocodea
- Family: Trogiidae
- Genus: Trogium
- Species: T. pulsatorium

Binomial name
- Trogium pulsatorium (Linnaeus, 1758)

= Trogium pulsatorium =

Species of booklouse

Trogium pulsatorium, known generally as larger pale booklouse, is a species of granary booklouse in the family Trogiidae. Other common names include the deathwatch, common booklouse, and grain psocid. It is found in Africa, Australia, Europe and Northern Asia (excluding China), Central America, North America, Southern Asia, New Zealand, and Antarctica.
