= Speleketor =

Scientific classification
- Domain: Eukaryota
- Kingdom: Animalia
- Phylum: Arthropoda
- Class: Insecta
- Order: Psocodea
- Family: Prionoglarididae
- Subfamily: Speleketorinae
- Tribe: Speleketorini
- Genus: Speleketor; Gurney, 1943

Genus of booklice

Speleketor is a genus of large-winged psocids in the family Prionoglarididae. There are at least three described species in Speleketor, found in the southwestern United States.

== Species ==
These three species belong to the genus Speleketor:

- Speleketor flocki Gurney, 1943
- Speleketor irwini Mockford, 1984
- Speleketor pictus Mockford, 1984
