= Palaeosiamoglaris =

Scientific classification
- Domain: Eukaryota
- Kingdom: Animalia
- Phylum: Arthropoda
- Class: Insecta
- Order: Psocodea
- Family: Prionoglarididae
- Genus: †Palaeosiamoglaris; Azar, Huang & Nel, 2017

Genus of booklice

Palaeosiamoglaris is a genus of fossil psocids in the family Prionoglarididae, found in mesozoic amber.
