= Afrotrogla =

Scientific classification
- Kingdom: Animalia
- Phylum: Arthropoda
- Clade: Pancrustacea
- Class: Insecta
- Order: Psocodea
- Family: Prionoglarididae
- Genus: Afrotrogla; Lienhard, 2007

Genus of booklice

Afrotrogla is an African genus of large-winged psocids in the family Prionoglarididae, discovered and described by Charles Lienhard. There are three described species in Afrotrogla, all found in certain caves of Namibia.

== Species ==
These three species belong to the genus Afrotrogla:

- Afrotrogla fabella Lienhard, 2007
- Afrotrogla maraisi Lienhard, 2007
- Afrotrogla oryx Lienhard, 2007
