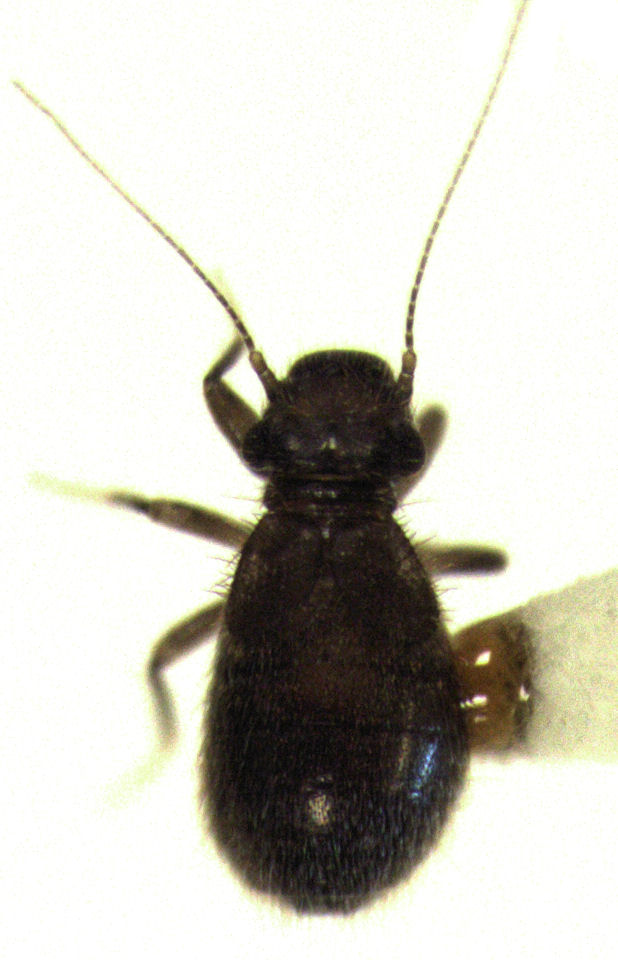

Scientific classification
- Domain: Eukaryota
- Kingdom: Animalia
- Phylum: Arthropoda
- Class: Insecta
- Order: Psocodea
- Family: Trogiidae
- Genus: Lepinotus
- Species: L. inquilinus

Binomial name
- Lepinotus inquilinus Heyden, 1850

= Lepinotus inquilinus =

Species of booklouse

Lepinotus inquilinus is a species of granary booklouse in the family Trogiidae. It is found in Africa, Australia, Europe and Northern Asia (excluding China), Central America, North America, Oceania, and Southern Asia.
