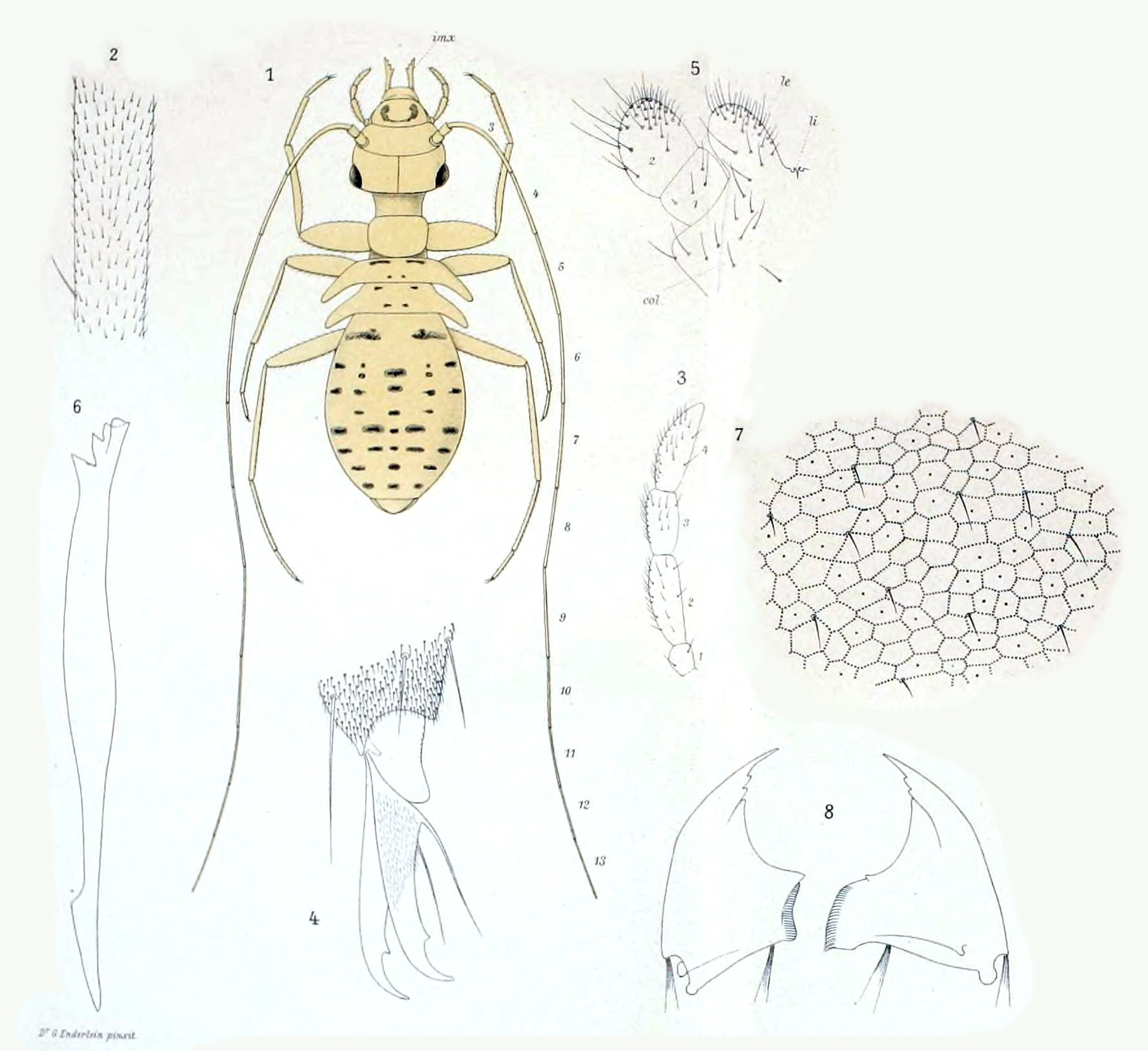
- Prionoglaris stygia Enderlein, 1909

Scientific classification
- Kingdom: Animalia
- Phylum: Arthropoda
- Clade: Pancrustacea
- Class: Insecta
- Order: Psocodea
- Family: Prionoglarididae
- Genus: Prionoglaris; Enderlein, 1909

= Prionoglaris =

Genus of booklice

Prionoglaris is a genus of large-winged psocids in the family Prionoglarididae, of which it is the type genus. There are four described species in Prionoglaris, found in Europe and the Middle East.

== Species ==
These three species belong to the genus Prionoglaris:

- Prionoglaris dactyloides Lienhard, 1988
- Prionoglaris stygia Enderlein, 1909
- Prionoglaris lindbergi Badonnel, 1962
- Prionoglaris kapralovi Lienhard, 2021
