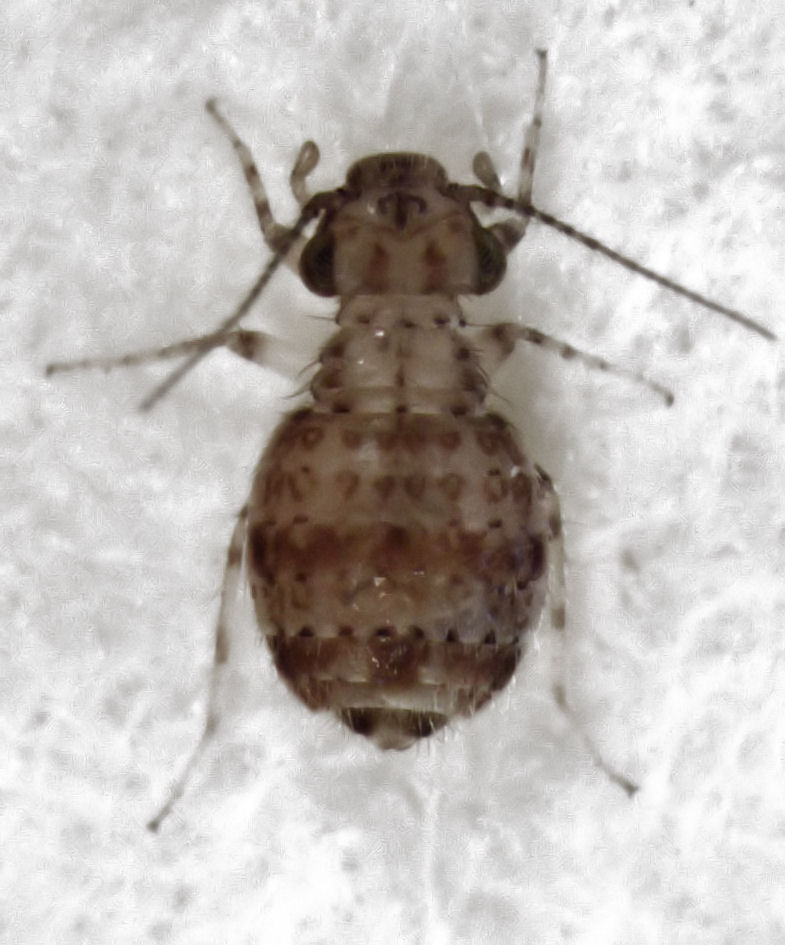
- Cerobasis guestfalica

Scientific classification
- Kingdom: Animalia
- Phylum: Arthropoda
- Class: Insecta
- Order: Psocodea
- Family: Trogiidae
- Genus: Cerobasis; Kolbe, 1882

= Cerobasis =

Genus of booklice

Cerobasis is a genus of granary booklice in the family Trogiidae. There are at least 30 described species in Cerobasis.

== Species ==
These 30 species belong to the genus Cerobasis:

- Cerobasis albipes Lienhard, 1996^{c g}
- Cerobasis alfredi Lienhard, 1984^{c g}
- Cerobasis alpha Garcia Aldrete, 1993^{c g}
- Cerobasis amorosa Lienhard, 1995^{c g}
- Cerobasis annulata (Hagen, 1865)^{i c g b}
- Cerobasis atlantica Lienhard, 2011^{c g}
- Cerobasis australica (Enderlein, 1907)^{c g}
- Cerobasis caboverdensis Lienhard, 1984^{c g}
- Cerobasis canariensis (Enderlein, 1910)^{c g}
- Cerobasis captiva Garcia Aldrete, 1988^{c g}
- Cerobasis clarionensis Garcia Aldrete, 1993^{c g}
- Cerobasis denticulata Lienhard, 1996^{c g}
- Cerobasis ericacea Baz, 1993^{c g}
- Cerobasis guestfalica (Kolbe, 1880)^{i c g b}
- Cerobasis harteni Lienhard, 1984^{c g}
- Cerobasis insularis Lienhard, 1996^{c g}
- Cerobasis intermedia Lienhard, 1984^{c g}
- Cerobasis lambda Thornton & A. K. T. Woo, 1973^{c g}
- Cerobasis lapidicola Garcia Aldrete, 1993^{c g}
- Cerobasis lineata Mockford, 2012^{c g}
- Cerobasis longicornis Baz, 1993^{c g}
- Cerobasis maculiceps Badonnel, 1967^{c g}
- Cerobasis maderensis Lienhard, 1983^{c g}
- Cerobasis maya Garcia Aldrete, 1991^{c g}
- Cerobasis nigra Lienhard, 1996^{c g}
- Cerobasis pineticola Baz, 1991^{c g}
- Cerobasis recta Thornton & A. K. T. Woo, 1973^{c g}
- Cerobasis rosae Baz, 1993^{c g}
- Cerobasis socotrae Lienhard, 1995^{c g}
- Cerobasis treptica Thornton & A. K. T. Woo, 1973^{c g}

Data sources: i = ITIS, c = Catalogue of Life, g = GBIF, b = Bugguide.net
