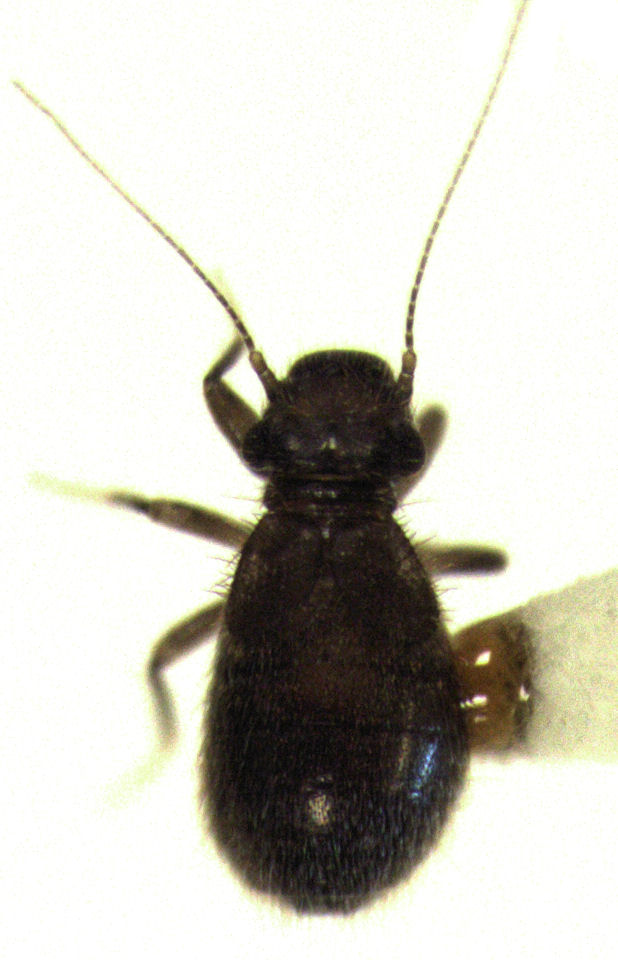
- Lepinotus inquilinus

Scientific classification
- Domain: Eukaryota
- Kingdom: Animalia
- Phylum: Arthropoda
- Class: Insecta
- Order: Psocodea
- Family: Trogiidae
- Genus: Lepinotus; Heyden, 1850

= Lepinotus =

Genus of booklice

Lepinotus is a genus of granary booklice in the family Trogiidae. There are about 12 described species in Lepinotus.

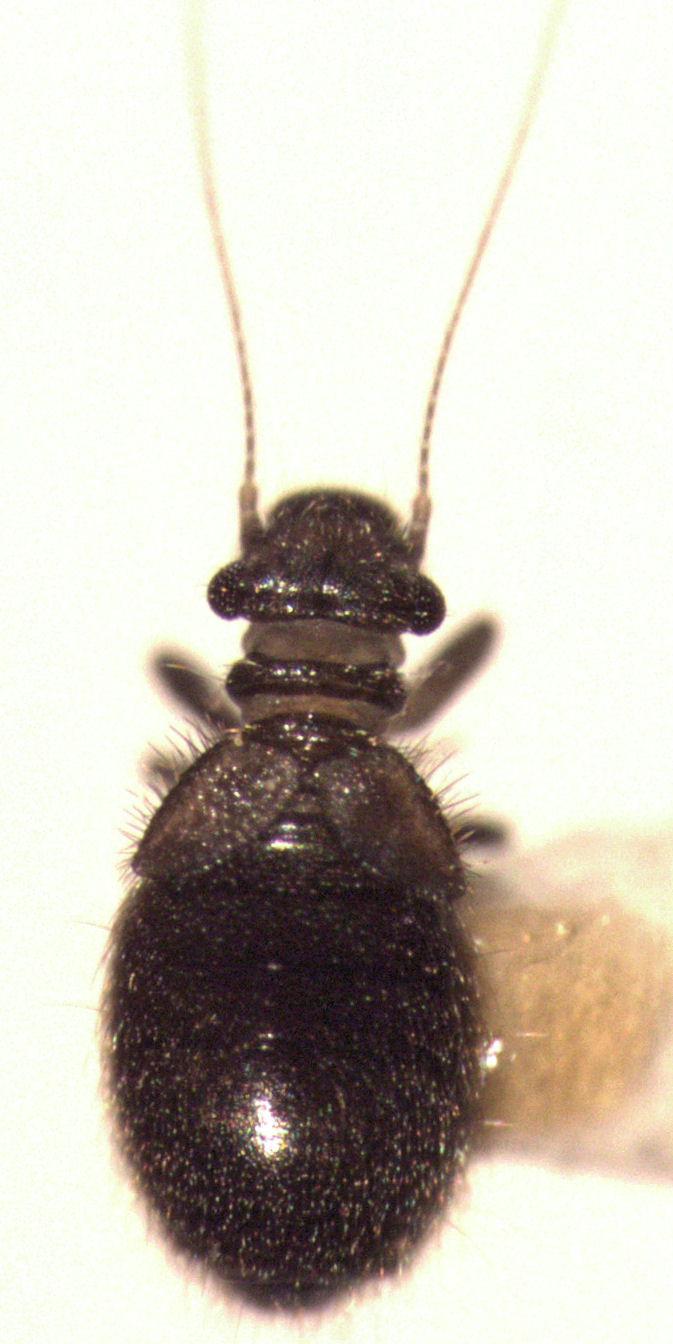
Lepinotus reticulatus

== Species ==
These 12 species belong to the genus Lepinotus:

- Lepinotus angolensis Badonnel, 1955
- Lepinotus fuscus Broadhead & Richards, 1982
- Lepinotus huoni Schmidt & New, 2008
- Lepinotus indicus Badonnel, 1981
- Lepinotus inquilinus Heyden, 1850
- Lepinotus lepinotoides (Ribaga, 1911)
- Lepinotus machadoi Badonnel, 1971
- Lepinotus patruelis Pearman, 1931
- Lepinotus reticulatus Enderlein, 1904 (reticulate-winged trogiid)
- Lepinotus stoneae Smithers, 1992
- Lepinotus tasmaniensis Hickman, 1934
- Lepinotus vermicularis Lienhard, 1996
