= The Exultant Ark =

The Exultant Ark: A Pictorial Tour of Animal Pleasure
- Author: Jonathan Peter Balcombe
- Language: English
- Subject: Pleasure in the animal world
- Genre: Science, ethics
- Publisher: University of California Press
- Publication date: May 2011
- Publication place: United States
- Media type: Hardcover, E-Book at University of California Press
- ISBN: 978-0-520-94864-8

The Exultant Ark is a 2011 non-fiction book by Jonathan Peter Balcombe.

It contends that animals engage in certain activities purely for pleasure.
