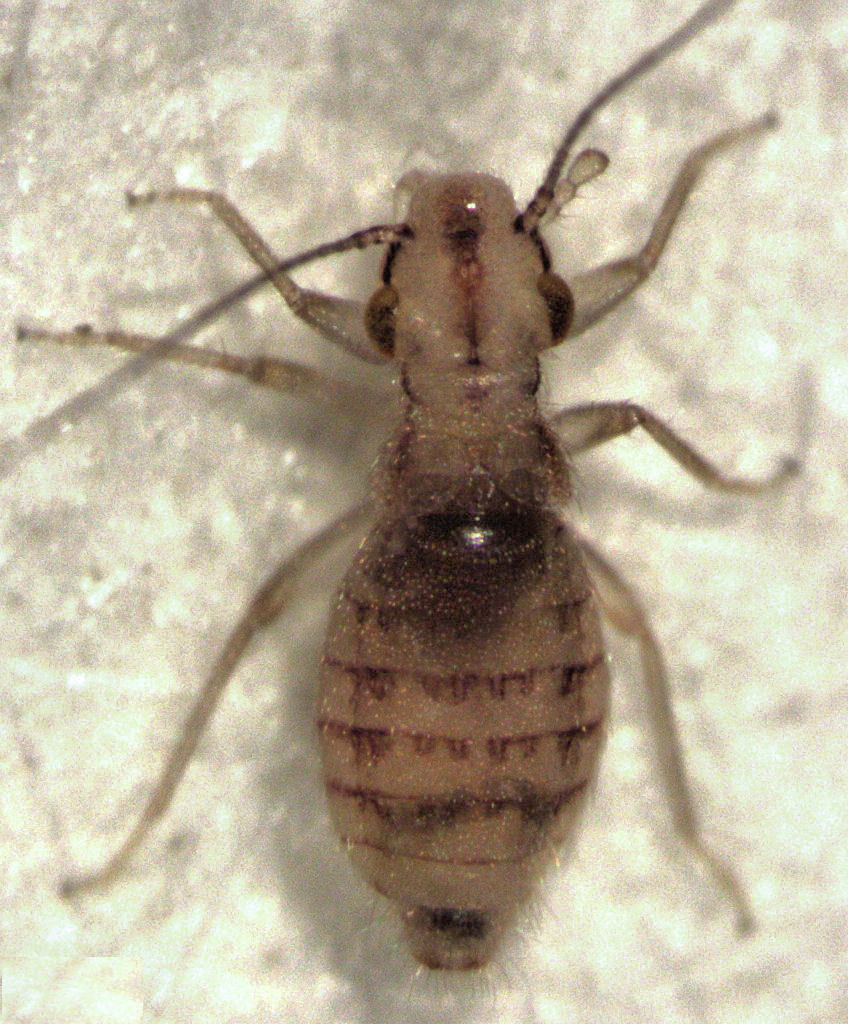
- Trogium pulsatorium

Scientific classification
- Domain: Eukaryota
- Kingdom: Animalia
- Phylum: Arthropoda
- Class: Insecta
- Order: Psocodea
- Family: Trogiidae
- Genus: Trogium; Illiger, 1798

= Trogium =

Genus of booklice

Trogium is a genus of granary booklice in the family Trogiidae. There are about eight described species in Trogium.

== Species ==
These eight species belong to the genus Trogium:

- Trogium apterum Broadhead & Richards, 1982
- Trogium braheicola Garcia Aldrete, 1983
- Trogium evansorum Smithers, 1994
- Trogium lapidarium (Badonnel, 1955)
- Trogium picticeps Badonnel, 1976
- Trogium pulsatorium (Linnaeus, 1758) (larger pale booklouse)
- Trogium stellatum (Badonnel, 1969)
- Trogium vanharteni Lienhard, 2008
