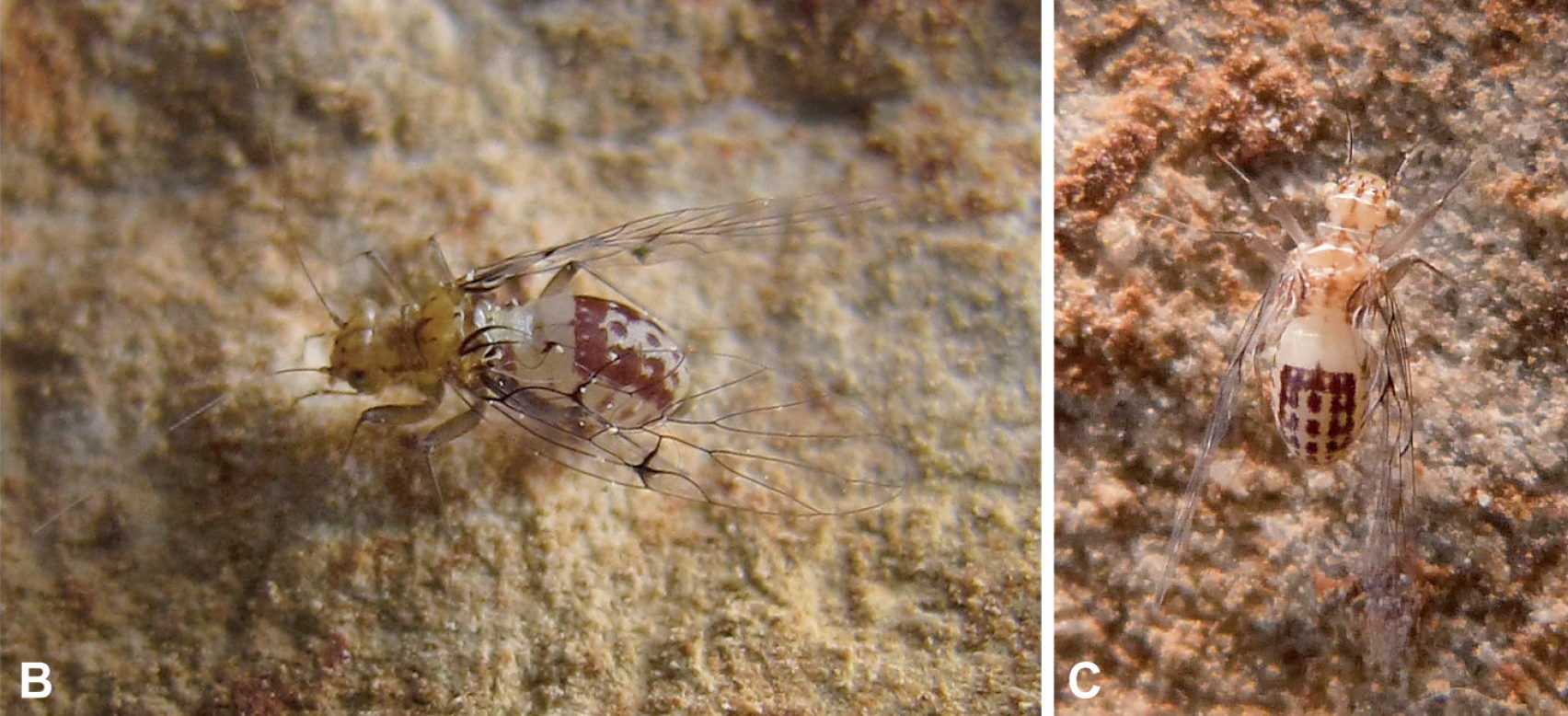
- (B) Neotrogla curvata, body length 3.5mm. (C) Neotrogla aurora, body length 2.8mm.

Scientific classification
- Kingdom: Animalia
- Phylum: Arthropoda
- Clade: Pancrustacea
- Class: Insecta
- Order: Psocodea
- Family: Prionoglarididae
- Genus: Neotrogla; Lienhard, 2010

Type species
- Neotrogla brasiliensis Lienhard, 2010

Species
- See text

= Neotrogla =

Genus of booklice

Neotrogla is a genus of barklice noted for its reversed sex roles and organs, traits shared by all species of the genus.

== Habitat ==
Neotrogla are found in dry cave systems throughout Brazil. They feed primarily on bat guano.

== Description ==
Neotrogla are about the size of fleas. The genus can be distinguished from other genera of Speleketorinae by the presence of articulated spines on the anterior side of their legs, and by their unique genitalia. Both sexes have hairs on their tarsus, but the hairs on females are markedly longer. Neotrogla have branched hindwings and brown forewings.

=== Sexual reversal ===
Female Neotrogla possess a penis-like organ, properly termed a "gynosome", but also described by some as a "female penis". They aggressively seek out mates, while males are more selective. During mating, the female mounts the male and penetrates his small genital opening from behind. Her gynosome swells and tiny barbs on the organ lock the individuals tightly together; when a researcher tried to separate mating individuals the male was torn in two, leaving his reproductive organs attached to the female. During mating, the female uses her gynosome to extract sperm and nutrient-filled seminal fluid from the male. A single mating session can last from 40 to 70 hours.

The reversal of sex organs may be explained by the lack of nutrients in the cave environment, which makes it evolutionarily useful for the female to extract nutrients from the male. Female Neotrogla drain males of seminal fluid even when they are too young to reproduce, giving weight to this theory, according to entomologist Kazunori Yoshizawa who co-authored the first study of the insects' mating behavior. If males spend most of their limited resources producing such nutrient-rich fluid, it would also help explain why males are choosy about their partners. Males of other insects are known to produce similar "nuptial gifts" of nutrients to be passed over during mating. However, the evolutionary origin of the penis-like organ remains a complete mystery. "Usually, a new structure evolves as a modification of a previously existing structure," Yoshizawa explained. Such an adaptation would be "exceptionally difficult" because of the need for male and female genital structures to change at the same time.

Female penetration of males is known in a few species, such as seahorse, but only Neotrogla females have a well-defined organ that can be described as a penis. Likewise, reversal of sex roles has been recorded in a few other species of animals. Neotrogla, however, appears to be unique in having both traits. According to Yoshizawa, the animal offers a singular chance to study the conflict between the sexes and the role of sexual selection in evolution. "It will be important to unveil why, among many sex-role-reversed animals, only Neotrogla evolved the elaborated female penis," he said. In 2017, Kazunori Yoshizawa, Rodrigo Ferreira, Yoshitaka Kamimura and Charles Lienhard have been awarded an Ig Nobel Prize in biology "for their discovery of a female penis, and a male vagina, in a cave insect".

Scientists who study Neotrogla have occasionally called the gynosome a "female penis" and insisted to drop the definition of penis as "the male copulatory organ". Motivations for using the term “female penis” include that such a term "is easier to understand and much more eye-catching" and that the gynosome have "analogous features" with male penises. Meanwhile, critics have argued that it does not fit the intromittent organ definition of "a structure that enters the female genital tract and deposits sperm".

== Taxonomic history ==
Neotrogla was first spotted by ecologist Rodrigo Ferreira. In 2010, entomologist Charles Lienhard assigned the insects to a new genus, designating Neotrogla brasiliensis as the type species. It was the first New World genus of Sensitibillini, a tribe of Speleketorinae previously known only from Africa. Neotrogla is closely related to the Southern African genus of barklice Afrotrogla.

== Species ==
As of 2014, four species have been described:

- N. aurora Lienhard, 2010
- N. brasiliensis Lienhard, 2010
- N. curvata Lienhard & Ferreira, 2013
- N. truncata Lienhard, 2010
