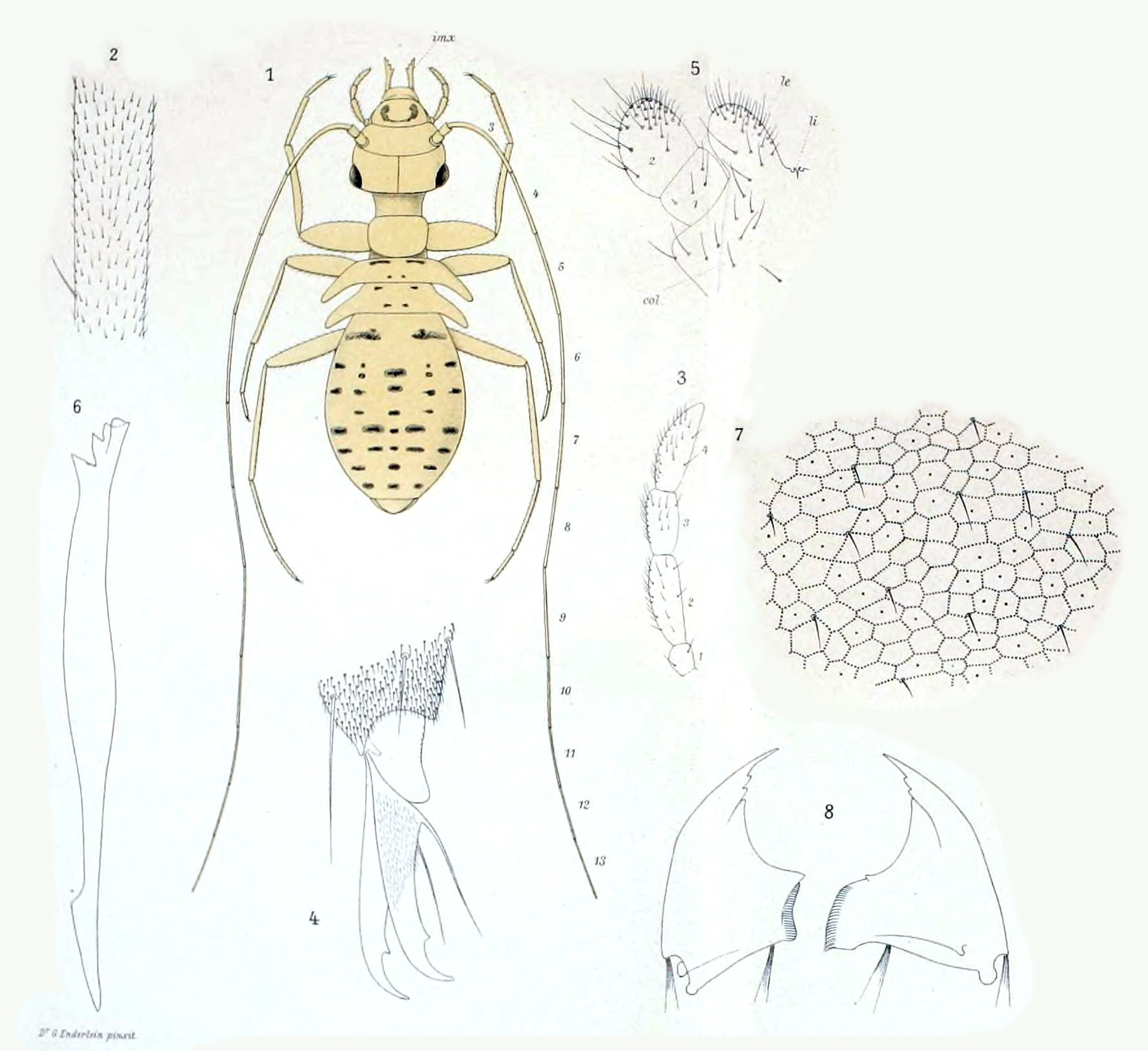
- Scientific illustration of Prionoglaris stygia by Enderlein (1909)

Scientific classification
- Kingdom: Animalia
- Phylum: Arthropoda
- Clade: Pancrustacea
- Class: Insecta
- Order: Psocodea
- Suborder: Trogiomorpha
- Infraorder: Prionoglaridetae
- Family: Prionoglarididae; Azar, Huang & Nel, 2017

= Prionoglarididae =

Prionoglarididae Temporal range: Barremian–Recent

Family of booklice

Prionoglarididae is a family of the order Psocodea (formerly Psocoptera) that are barklice characterized by the reduction or simplification of the lacinia in adults and the specialised form of the male genitalia. It contains the only known genus of animals, Neotrogla, where females possess a penis-like organ and take on typical male sex roles.

Prionoglarididae includes about 9 genera with more than 20 known species. They have been found in Europe, Afghanistan, Namibia, and the United States. The only genus found in the United States is Speleketor, which includes three species: Speleketor flocki, Speleketor irwini, and Speleketor pictus.

== Genera ==
These eight genera belong to the family Prionoglarididae:

- Afrotrogla Lienhard, 2007
- Neotrogla Lienhard, Oliveira do Carmo & Lopes Ferreira, 2010
- Prionoglaris Enderlein, 1909
- Sensitibilla Lienhard, 2000
- Siamoglaris Lienhard, 2004
- Speleketor Gurney, 1943
- Speleopsocus Lienhard, 2010
- † Palaeosiamoglaris Azar, Huang & Nel, 2017 Burmese amber, Myanmar, Cenomanian, and Lebanese amber, Lebanon, Barremian
