= Jonathan Balcombe =

British ethologist

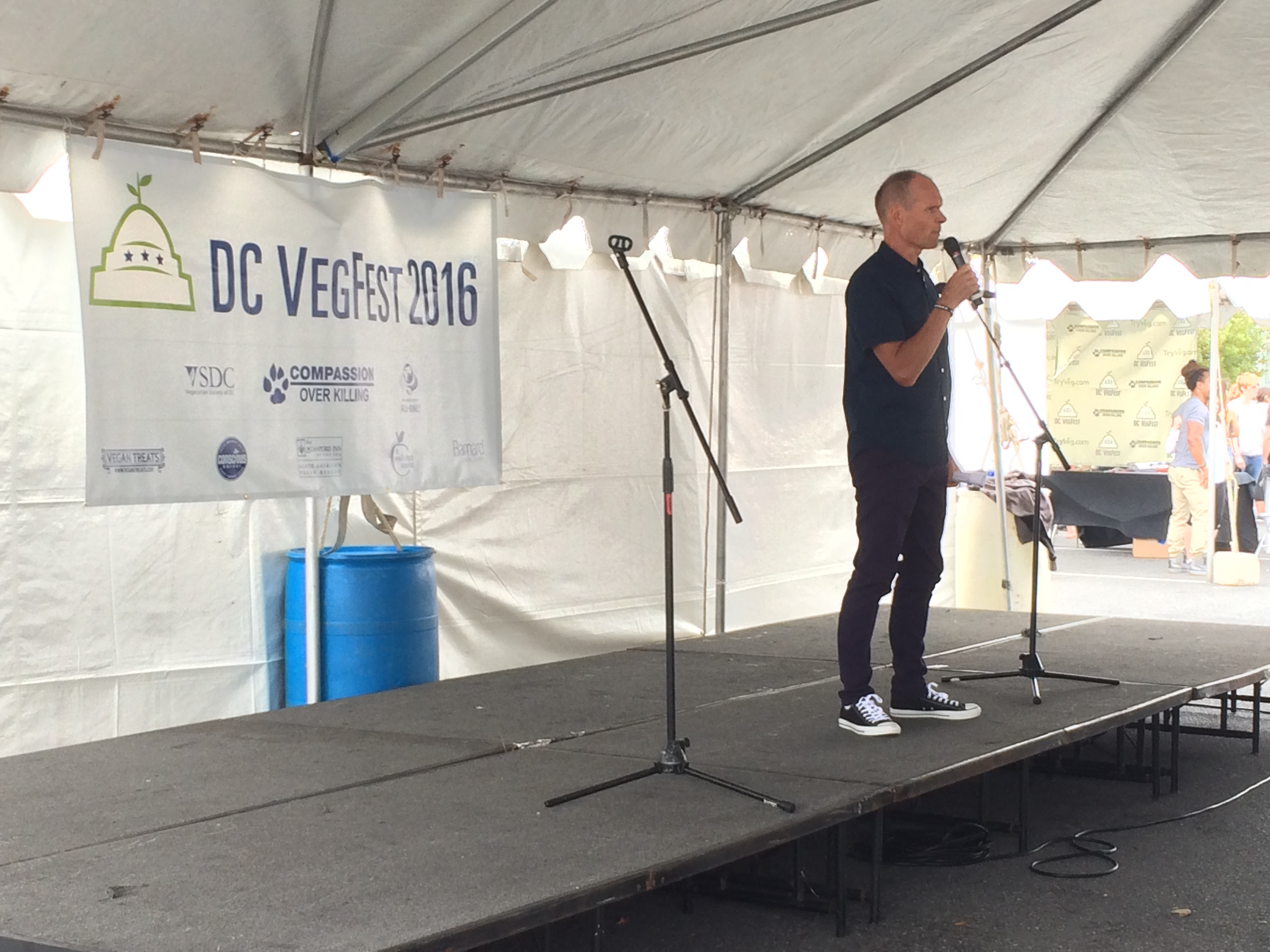
- Jonathan Balcombe speaking at DC Vegfest in 2016
- Born: 28 February 1959 (age 67); Hornchurch, England
- Occupations: Ethology, Author
- Website: jonathanbalcombe.com

Jonathan Balcombe (born 28 February 1959) is an ethologist and author. He is formerly director of animal sentience with the Humane Society Institute for Science and Policy, and department chair for animal studies with Humane Society University, in Washington, DC. He lectures internationally on animal behavior and the human-animal relationship. He also served as associate editor of the journal Animal Sentience from 2015 to 2019.

== Biography ==
Balcombe was born in Hornchurch, England. He grew up in New Zealand and Canada before settling in the United States in 1987.

Balcombe earned a Bachelor of Science degree in biology in 1983 from York University in Toronto, then a Master of Science in biology from Carleton University in Ottawa in 1987. In 1991, he completed a Ph.D in ethology (animal behavior) at the University of Tennessee, where he studied mother-pup vocal communication in the Mexican free-tailed bat.

Balcombe has worked for several animal protection organizations, including The Humane Society of the United States, Physicians Committee for Responsible Medicine, and People for the Ethical Treatment of Animals. He also worked as a research coordinator and grant writer for Immersion Medical, a for-profit company that makes virtual reality training simulators for minimally-invasive surgery. In addition to writing books, Jonathan currently does professional editing for aspiring and established authors. He also teaches a course in animal sentience for the Viridis Graduate Institute.

Balcombe has been a vegan since 1989.

== Writing ==
Balcombe's first book, The Use of Animals in Higher Education: Problems, Alternatives, and Recommendations, was published by Humane Society Press in 2000. His trade book, Pleasurable Kingdom: Animals and the Nature of Feeling Good, was released by Macmillan in 2006. The book details Balcombe's positions on the sentience of animals, and the existence of pleasure seeking behavior, in contrast with the behavioralist mainstream, which rejects anthropomorphism of animals. Deutschlandradio called the book a "convincing and a fun read."

In 2010, Balcombe published Second Nature: The Inner Lives of Animals, in which he surveys recent scientific discoveries about animal cognition, emotion, and virtue, and aims to "protest against what he sees as an unbroken tradition of human cruelty and indifference."

The Exultant Ark: A Pictorial Tour of Animal Pleasure was released in 2011 by the University of California Press. Using images of contented animals in their natural environment, Balcombe "proves that animals aren’t always engaged in a battle for survival but will frequently do things for nothing more than the feeling of satisfaction." Balcombe disputes the mainstream scientific community's belief that the animal kingdom is an unforgiving struggle for survival. The book briefly broke into the top 100 on Amazon.com following favorable reviews in The New York Times and the New York Post.

Balcombe's 2016 book, What A Fish Knows, combines science and story-telling to examine the inner lives of the world's most diverse group of vertebrates. What A Fish Knows has a release date of 7 June 2016, from Scientific American/Farrar, Straus and Giroux.

Balcombe has published over 60 scholarly articles and book chapters on various topics, including animal behavior, animal research, animal dissection, medical simulation, and veganism. His essay titled "After Meat" appears in the 2016 book "Impact of Meat Consumption on Health and Environmental Sustainability," edited by Dora Marinova and Talia Raphaely.

== Advocacy ==
Balcombe uses a variety of platforms to advocate for a sea-change in the human-animal relationship. In addition to his books and journal papers, he is a regular speaker at conferences, campuses, public schools and other venues. He is interviewed often in the media, and he has written blogs for Psychology Today, One Green Planet, Secretary of Innovation, and Physicians Committee for Responsible Medicine. He is a manuscript reviewer for scholarly journals such as Animal Behaviour, the Journal of Applied Animal Welfare Science, and the Journal of Consciousness Studies.

== Bibliography ==
Books

- The Use of Animals in Higher Education: Problems, Alternatives, and Recommendations (Humane Society Press, 2000) ISBN 978-0965894210
- Pleasurable Kingdom: Animals and the Nature of Feeling Good (Macmillan, 2006) ISBN 978-1403986023
- Second Nature: The Inner Lives of Animals (Macmillan, 2010) ISBN 978-0230107816
- The Exultant Ark: A Pictorial Tour of Animal Pleasure (University of California Press, 2011) ISBN 978-0520260245
- What A Fish Knows: The Inner Lives of Our Underwater Cousins (Scientific American/Farrar, Straus and Giroux, 2016) ISBN 978-0374288211
- Super Fly: The Unexpected Lives of the World's Most Successful Insects (Penguin Books, 2020) ASIN B085XJG442

== See also ==
- List of vegans
- Pain in fish
