= Os clitoridis =

Bone in the clitoris

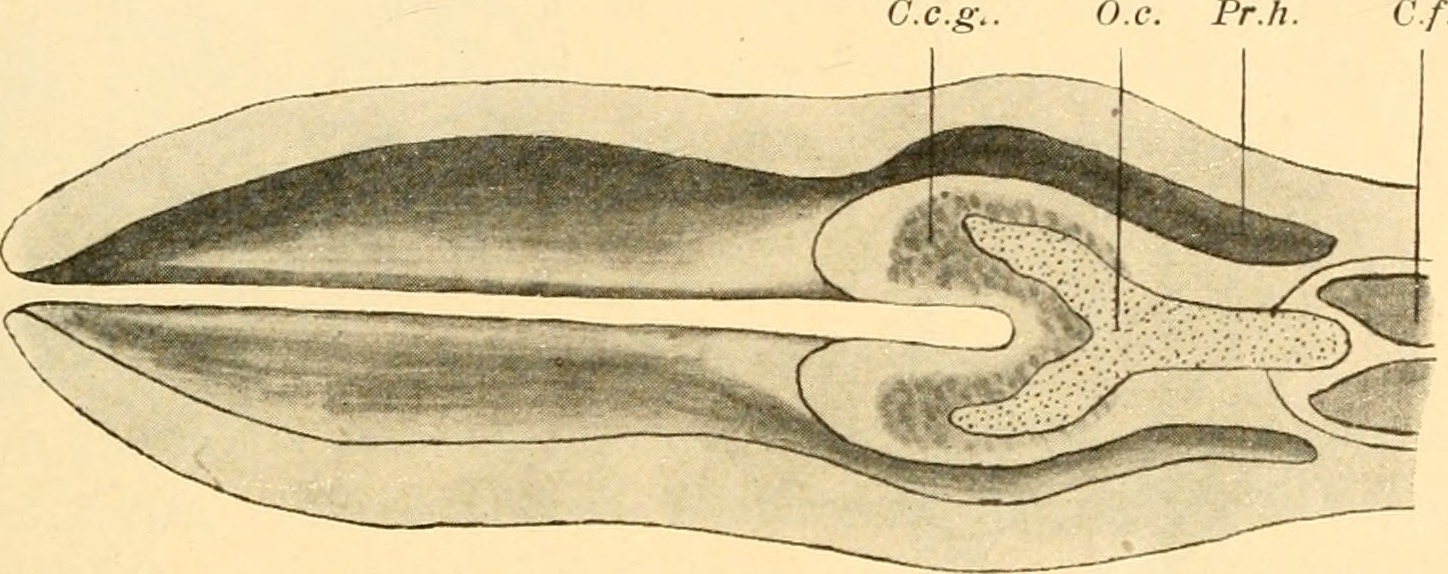
1914 illustration of the os clitoridis in the clitoris of a greater dwarf lemur (labeled "O.c.")

The os clitoridis (also called the os clitoris, clitoral bone or baubellum; pl.: baubella) is a bone inside the clitoris of many placental mammals. It is absent from the human clitoris, but present in the clitoris of some primates, such as ring-tailed lemurs and non-human great apes. However, in the latter case, the bone is greatly reduced in size. It is homologous to the baculum in male mammals.

The structure is more evolutionarily labile than the baculum, exhibiting both more inherent variability and more gains and losses over time, which has been interpreted as evidence for its non-functionality.

Other work posits that the variation in the os clitoridis could be driven by intersexual conflict, lock-and-key genital evolution, and cryptic female choice, especially given the high level of variation within species as well as between them.

== History ==
The os clitoridis was described in 1666 by Claude Perrault in otters and in the lioness.

The term os clitoridis was used in 1819 by Friedrich Sigismund Leuckart regarding the capuchin monkey.

This bone was named baubellum by Guy Chester Shortridge in 1934, but it is much less common in comparison to the use of the word baculum. The Latin terms os clitoris and os clitoridis are most often found in scientific publications.

== Presence in mammals ==
The os clitoridis has been described in species belonging to the orders Chiroptera, Primates, Rodentia and Carnivora. As with the baculum, this wide distribution suggests a primitive character that has been lost in some phylogenetic branches of the class Mammalia.

Depending on the species, the presence of this bone varies from one specimen to another. It has been observed, for example, in only 30% of American red squirrels. Its presence is even rarer in dogs: 3% (6 out of 200) presence on a radiological sample of American Cocker Spaniels and 2% (4 out of 200) for the German Shorthaired Pointer.

The shape and size vary greatly from one species to another. The size is often very small: (Note: All measurements listed below are less than an inch, with the exception of the walrus, which can be up to 1 inch.)

- 2 x 6 mm in the mountain beaver
- 2 x 0.4 x 0.2 mm in an adult lioness
- 0.5 x 0.05 x 0.01 mm in a 3-year-old adult cat
- From 10 to 30 mm in a walrus (note that the male of this species has the longest baculum, with a size of 63 cm (24 inches))
- 9.3 mm in the American badger

=== Development ===
The os clitoridis is often present, or even prominent, during the embryonic or immature phase, and then decreases with age. For example, in a walrus, the size of the bone tends to shrink as the years pass.

== Function ==
The exact function of the os clitoridis is not known, but a function during copulation is assumed. For some, the species distribution would be the same as the baculum. The os clitoridis would be an equivalent, without evolutionary function, of the baculum, persisting or disappearing during sexual differentiation under hormonal influence. Experiments with treatment of female rats with testosterone led to a persistence or increase in the size of the os clitoridis.
