= Günther Enderlein =

German zoologist (1872–1968)

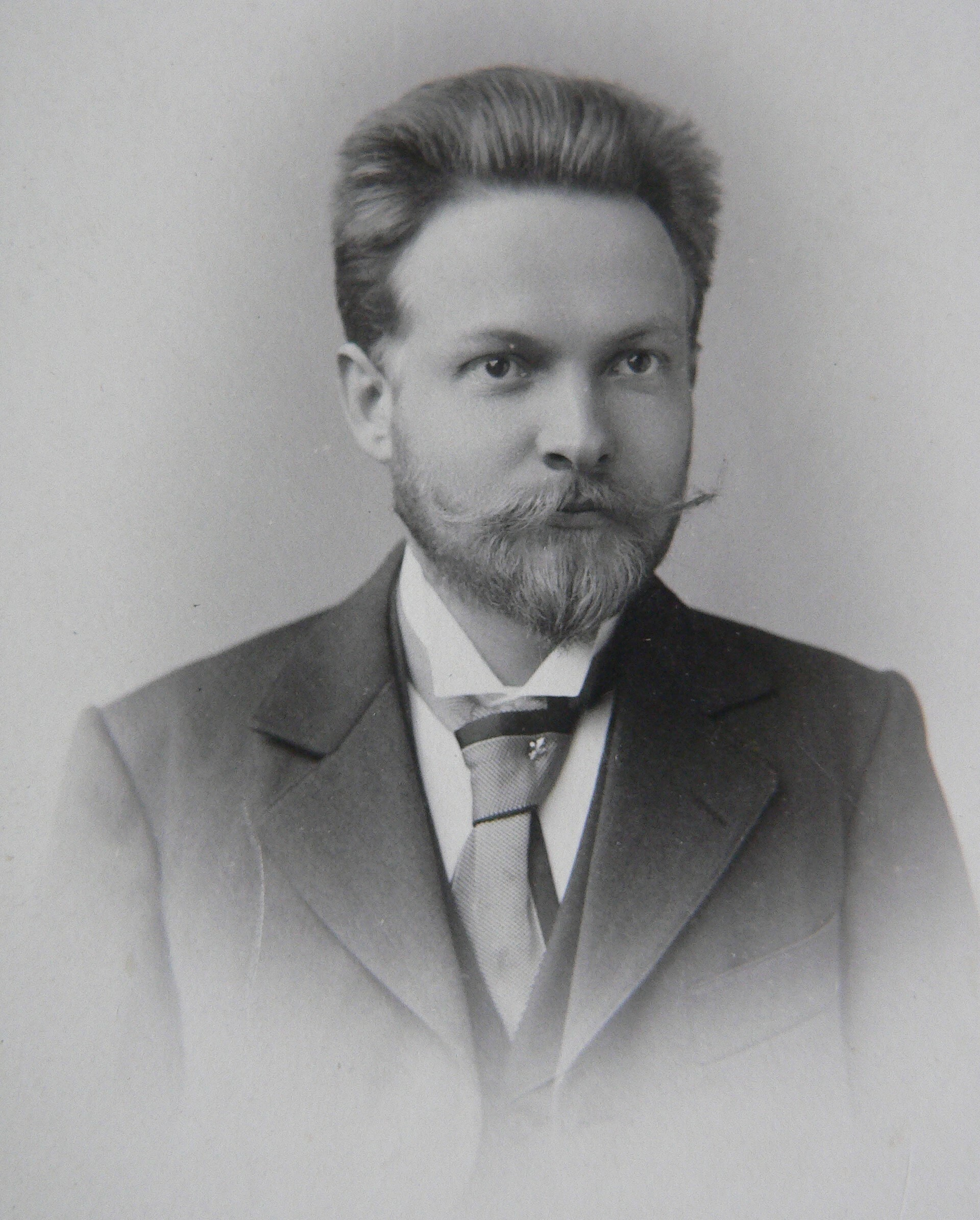
- Born: 7 July 1872; Leipzig, Germany
- Died: 11 August 1968 (aged 96); Wentorf bei Hamburg
- Education: University of Leipzig, University of Berlin
- Known for: Theories on Pleomorphism
- Scientific career
- Fields: Zoology; Entomology
- Workplaces: Museum für Naturkunde, Berlin; Stettin
- Author abbrev. (botany): Enderlein

Günther Enderlein (7 July 1872 – 11 August 1968) was a German zoologist, entomologist, microbiologist, researcher, physician for 60 years, and later a manufacturer of pharmaceutical products. Enderlein received international renown for his insect research, and in Germany became famous due to his concept of the pleomorphism of microorganisms and his hypotheses about the origins of cancer, based on the work of other scientists. His hypotheses about pleomorphism and cancer have now been disproved by science and have only some historical importance today. Some of his concepts, however, are still popular in alternative medicine. A blood test is named after him: dark field microscopy according to Enderlein.

== Life ==
Enderlein was born in Leipzig, the son of a teacher. He studied in Leipzig and Berlin and got his PhD in 1898 as a zoologist. He became professor in 1924. First he worked as assistant at the Museum für Naturkunde in Berlin, and went later to Stettin, now Szczecin in Poland but at that time in Germany. During the First World War he worked as a military surgeon major even though he was a biologist, as there were not enough physicians available at that time. He returned to Berlin in 1919 and remained there until 1937. After 1933 he became production manager in a small pharmaceutical company: Sanum (that later became Sanum-Kehlbeck). In 1944 he founded his own pharmaceutical company IBICA in Berlin, transferred later to Hamburg. He was also the publisher of a newspaper called Akmon. After his death, IBICA and Sanum merged in 1975 to form the Sanum-Kehlbeck company which is still active today.

== Scientific work ==
Enderlein published more than 500 scientific articles, mostly about insects. He worked in taxonomy and systematics of many Diptera families, as well as Psocoptera (of which he described the genera Prionoglaris and Trichadenotecnum). Many insects were named by him and some still carry his name (like the genus Enderleinella). His way of distinction by external characteristics led to some disputes inside the scientific community of that time (see Zwick 1995 for details). Enderlein was mostly interested in the fly family, Simuliidae.

== Theories on pleomorphism and the origins of diseases ==
He caused more sensation, however, when he developed and published his concepts about the pleomorphism of microorganisms. The concept of pleomorphism was quite controversial at the end of the 19th and the beginning of the 20th century. Eventually the monomorphism concept of Louis Pasteur was accepted by the scientific community in the 1950s.

The term pleomorphism comes from the Greek pleion = more, morphe = form, and was apparently created by French chemist and biologist Antoine Béchamp (1816–1908). Similar concepts were known in ancient times as concepts of abiogenesis, but these were disproved during the 18th century.

Based on the early work of Béchamp, who was an opponent of Louis Pasteur, and based on the point of view of contemporary Wilhelm von Brehmer (1883–1958) and on his own microscopic observation, he developed his own complicated pleomorphism hypothesis. He was convinced that every microorganism would pass through a particular development cycle that he called cyclode (bacterial cyclode). Béchamp had issued earlier the opinion that in every animal or plant cell there were small particles that he called microzymas or granulations moleculaires. These particles were able to transform into pathogenic bacteria under certain circumstances. Pasteur and the majority of the scientific community at that time did not accept this opinion, although later studies by renowned bacteriologists suggest that the scientific community was becoming more favorable to pleomorphism up until the mid-1900s. These studies were inconclusive and subsequently disproved.

At that time, it was also known that plasmodia (the causal agents of malaria) were able to change form during their different developmental stages.

In 1925, Enderlein published his main work: Bakterien-Cyklogenie. He developed not only a complex hypothesis, but he created also his own terminology that makes reading his papers difficult. He stated that small, harmless, beneficial herbal particles were present in every animal or plant which may transform into larger pathogenic bacteria or fungi under certain circumstances. The smallest particles are called protits, symbionts, or endobionts. Protits are, according to Enderlein, small colloids of proteins, sized between 1 and 10 nm. Enderlein distinguished between acid and alkaline symbionts. These particles are able to be transmitted via the placenta before birth.

Enderlein was convinced that these small particles were harmless and necessary for health. Only the larger organisms which developed out of these particles were pathogenic bacteria or fungi (Enderlein used the word valent for pathogen). The smaller, harmless particles are able to interact and to control the larger valent particles or organisms by their ability to destroy them by a process of merging. After death, the smallest particles, which survive and may serve another host-organism, participate in the decomposition of the host.

A disturbance of the symbiotic, friendly coexistence between the smaller particles and the larger organism would start a dangerous situation he called mochlosis that leads at the end to a disease, facilitated by a wrong way of thinking and living. In such a case, he speaks about an increase of valenz. The most primitive protits would build up one-dimensional chains, called filits. These filits may build up a two-dimensional and later three-dimensional net of filits, but this only at a pH greater than 7.3. In a healthy environment, such a filit net may never build up. The filit nets lead to larger a particle: the symprotits, and later the chondrits. Chondrits are about the size of a virus: 15-300 nm. Enderlein claimed that they are visible with dark field microscopy. If this process continues, we will observe larger particles called mychits, or bacteria-nuclei, forming the basis of a bacterium.

- Apathogenic forms within a cyclode are: protit, filium, filit, spermit, symprotit, chondrit, microchondrit.
- Pathogenic forms (dynamovalent) are: makrosymprotit, makrochondrit, sporoidsymprotit, filit net, mychit (bacterial nucleus), cystit, thecit, diökothecit, bacteria (Streptococcus, Staphylococcus, Mycobacterium tuberculosis), amoebit, zoit.
- Other named stages are: basit, phytit, rhabdit, cystit, linit, ascit, synascit.

According to Enderlein, the different diseases of man are related to particular cyclodes leading to particular microorganisms. He was mainly interested in two cyclodes: the cyclode leading to the fungus Mucor racemosus, and the cyclode leading to the fungus Aspergillus niger. The mucor racemosus cyclode leads to diseases of the blood and spine, and rheumatism. In these cases, a marcant filit net should always be present. An injection of harmless symbionts may help here, as they are able to destroy larger valent microorganisms.

The Aspergillus niger cyclode leads to diseases of the lung: tuberculosis, and cancer. In this case, an injection of symbionts may be helpful.

Enderlein was convinced that bacteria may increase in number or by asexual division or by another sexual way of merging the two nuclei before division.

He claimed that bacteria and fungi may regress or downgrade back to harmless particles, but this process is only possible in a healthy host organism. He believed the use of some catalytic drugs might support that process: the chondritins.

== Alternative medicine ==
Enderlein recommended a vegetarian diet of raw foods to cure various diseases. He developed a range of homeopathic remedies to treat a range of diseases from tuberculosis to cancer. His remedies included "Mucokehl" and "Utilin". Enderlein is cited by those in the alternative medicine community. His ideas have been used as the basis of Sanum Therapy: a form of homeopathy which has been dismissed as quackery.
