= Charles Lienhard =

- Born: January 1949 (age 77); Zürich, Switzerland
- Education: ETH Zurich
- Known for: Research on psocids and Neotrogla
- Awards: Ig Nobel Prize in Biology (2017)
- Scientific career
- Fields: Entomology
- Workplaces: ETH Zurich; Natural History Museum of Geneva

Charles Lienhard (born January 1949) is a Swiss entomologist specializing in psocids.

He worked at the Institute of Entomology of ETH Zurich from 1971 to 1980, obtaining his doctorate there in 1976. He then worked at the Natural History Museum of Geneva from 1981 until his retirement in early 2009, after which he became an honorary curator. In 2017, he received the Ig Nobel Prize in biology for demonstrating the existence of organs equivalent to a penis in the female (gynosome), and to a vagina in the male of bark lice of the genus Neotrogla.

== Taxa dedicated to him ==
A subtribe of psocids, Lienhardiellina Mockford, 1999, and the genus Lienhardiella Mockford, 1999 are dedicated to him,as are numerous species of arthropods, including:

- Acrotocepheus lienhardi Mahunka, 1989
- Apocheiridium lienhardi Mahnert, 2011
- Burmjapyx lienhardi Pagés, 2000
- Buthus lienhardi Lourenço, 2003
- Coronibatula lienhardi Mahunka, 1988
- Eukoenenia lienhardi Condé, 1989
- Inmalthodes lienhardi Wittmer, 1992
- Notophthiracarus lienhardi Mahunka, 1996
- Papillacarus lienhardi Mahunka, 1997
- Passalozetes lienhardi Mahunka, 1997
- Pseudotocepheus lienhardi Mahunka, 1993
- Ptiloppia lienhardi Mahunka, 2001
- Sabahtritia lienhardi Mahunka, 1995
- Scaphisoma lienhardi Löbl & Ogawa, 2016
- Suctobelbella lienhardi Mahunka, 1983
- Trioza lienhardi Burckhardt, 1981
- Zetomotrichus lienhardi Mahunka, 1989
