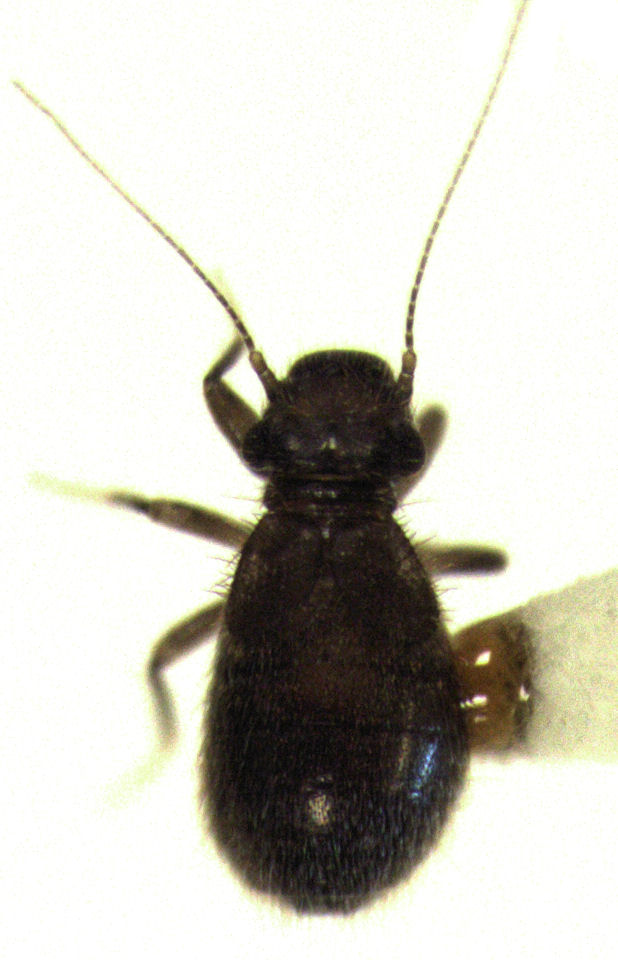
- Lepinotus inquilinus

Scientific classification
- Kingdom: Animalia
- Phylum: Arthropoda
- Clade: Pancrustacea
- Class: Insecta
- Order: Psocodea
- Suborder: Trogiomorpha
- Infraorder: Atropetae
- Family: Trogiidae; Roesler, 1944

= Trogiidae =

Trogiidae Temporal range: Santonian–Recent

Family of booklice

Trogiidae is a family of granary booklice in the order Psocodea (formerly Psocoptera). There are about 11 genera and more than 50 described species in Trogiidae.

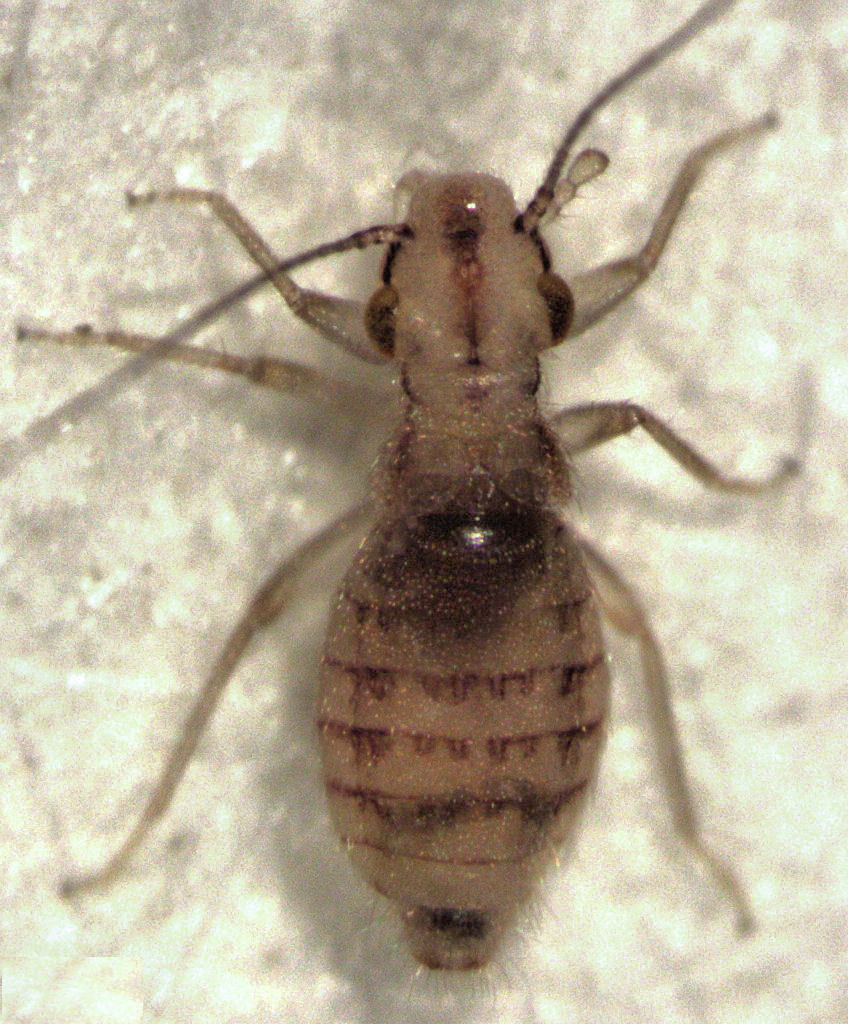
Trogium pulsatorium

== Genera ==
These 11 genera belong to the family Trogiidae:

- Anomocopeus Badonnel, 1967
- Cerobasis Kolbe, 1882
- Helenatropos Lienhard, 2005
- Helminotrogia Li, 2002
- Lepinotus Heyden, 1850
- Myrmicodipnella Enderlein, 1909
- Phlebotrogia Li, 2002
- Spinatropos Lienhard, 2000
- Trogium Illiger, 1798
- † Cretolepinotus Cockx et al., 2020 Canadian amber, Wapiti Formation, Campanian
- † Eolepinotus Vishnyakova, 1975 Taimyr amber, Russia, Santonian
- † Paralepinotus Azar et al., 2018 Fushun amber, China, Ypresian
