= Physiology of underwater diving =

Adaptations of marine vertebrates to diving

The physiology of underwater diving is the physiological adaptations to diving of air-breathing vertebrates that have returned to the ocean from terrestrial lineages. They are a diverse group that include sea snakes, sea turtles, the marine iguana, saltwater crocodiles, penguins, pinnipeds, cetaceans, sea otters, manatees and dugongs. All known diving vertebrates dive to feed, and the extent of the diving in terms of depth and duration are influenced by feeding strategies, but also, in some cases, with predator avoidance. Diving behaviour is inextricably linked with the physiological adaptations for diving and often the behaviour leads to an investigation of the physiology that makes the behaviour possible, so they are considered together where possible. Most diving vertebrates make relatively short shallow dives. Sea snakes, crocodiles, and marine iguanas only dive in inshore waters and seldom dive deeper than 10 meters (33 feet). Some of these groups can make much deeper and longer dives. Emperor penguins regularly dive to depths of 400 to 500 meters (1,300 to 1,600 feet) for 4 to 5 minutes, often dive for 8 to 12 minutes, and have a maximum endurance of about 22 minutes. Elephant seals stay at sea for between 2 and 8 months and dive continuously, spending 90% of their time underwater and averaging 20 minutes per dive with less than 3 minutes at the surface between dives. Their maximum dive duration is about 2 hours and they routinely feed at depths between 300 and 600 meters (980 and 1,970 feet), though they can exceed depths of 1,600 meters (5,200 feet). Beaked whales have been found to routinely dive to forage at depths between 835 and 1,070 meters (2,740 and 3,510 feet), and remain submerged for about 50 minutes. Their maximum recorded depth is 1,888 meters (6,194 feet), and the maximum duration is 85 minutes.

Air-breathing marine vertebrates that dive to feed must deal with the effects of pressure at depth, hypoxia during apnea, and the need to find and capture their food. Adaptations to diving can be associated with these three requirements. Adaptations to pressure must deal with the mechanical effects of pressure on gas-filled cavities, solubility changes of gases under pressure, and possible direct effects of pressure on the metabolism, while adaptations to breath-hold capacity include modifications to metabolism, perfusion, carbon dioxide tolerance, and oxygen storage capacity. Adaptations to find and capture food vary depending on the food, but deep-diving generally involves operating in a dark environment.

Diving vertebrates have increased the amount of oxygen stored in their internal tissues. This oxygen store has three components; oxygen contained in the air in the lungs, oxygen stored by haemoglobin in the blood, and by myoglobin, in muscle tissue, The muscle and blood of diving vertebrates have greater concentrations of haemoglobin and myoglobin than terrestrial animals. Myoglobin concentration in locomotor muscles of diving vertebrates is up to 30 times more than in terrestrial relatives. Haemoglobin is increased by both a relatively larger amount of blood and a larger proportion of red blood cells in the blood compared with terrestrial animals. The highest values are found in the mammals which dive deepest and longest.

Body size is a factor in diving ability. A larger body mass correlates to a relatively lower metabolic rate, while oxygen storage is directly proportional to body mass, so larger animals should be able to dive for longer, all other things being equal. Swimming efficiency also affects diving ability, as low drag and high propulsive efficiency requires less energy for the same dive. Burst and glide locomotion is also often used to minimise energy consumption, and may involve using positive or negative buoyancy to power part of the ascent or descent.

The responses seen in seals diving freely at sea are physiologically the same as those seen during forced dives in the laboratory. They are not specific to immersion in water, but are protective mechanisms against asphyxia which are common to all mammals but more effective and developed in seals. The extent to which these responses are expressed depends greatly on the seal's anticipation of dive duration. The regulation of bradycardia and vasoconstriction of the dive response in both mammals and diving ducks can be triggered by facial immersion, wetting of the nostrils and glottis, or stimulation of trigeminal and glossopharyngeal nerves. Animals cannot convert fats to glucose, and in many diving animals, carbohydrates are not readily available from the diet, nor stored in large quantities, so as they are essential for anaerobic metabolism, they could be a limiting factor.

Decompression sickness (DCS) is a disease associated with metabolically inert gas uptake at pressure, and its subsequent release into the tissues in the form of bubbles. Marine mammals were thought to be relatively immune to DCS due to anatomical, physiological and behavioural adaptations that reduce tissue loading with dissolved nitrogen during dives, but observations show that gas bubbles may form, and tissue injury may occur under certain circumstances. Decompression modelelling using measured dive profiles predict the possibility of high blood and tissue nitrogen tensions.

== Range of performance ==
Strong allometric relationships have been observed between body mass and maximum diving depths and durations in marine mammals, birds and marine turtles. Exceptions can be seen in baleen whales, eared seals and flighted diving birds, which showed no correlation between size and maximum diving depth. Penguins showed the highest correlations of diving capacity with body mass, followed by toothed whales and true seals. Baleen whales show a correlation between mass and maximum dive duration. Comparisons between the groups show that alcids, penguins, and true seals are exceptional divers relative to their masses and that baleen whales dive to shallower depths and for shorter durations than would be expected from their size. Many of these variations can be explained by adaptation to ecological feeding niches exploited by the animals.

Oxygen stores, routine and maximum depths and durations for some diving vertebrates
Species	Body mass (kg)	Total store (ml/kg)	% Lungs	% Blood	% Muscle	Routine depth (m)	Maximum depth (m)	Routine duration (min)	Maximum duration (min)
Human	70	20	24	57	15	5	133	0.25	6
Weddell seal	400	87	5	66	29	200	700	15	93
Elephant seal	400	97	4	71	25	500	1500	25	120
California sealion	100	40	21	45	34	40	275	2.5	10
Bottlenose dolphin	200	36	34	27	39	-	535	-	-
Sperm whale	10000	77	10	58	34	500	2035	40	75
Leatherback turtle	-	-	-	-	-	-	1280	3-8	>70

== Marine mammals ==
Marine mammals adaptation to deep and long duration breath-hold diving involves more efficient use of lungs that are proportionately smaller than those of terrestrial animals of similar size. The adaptations to the lungs allow more efficient extraction of oxygen from inhaled air, and a higher exchange rate of air of up to 90% of each breath. Their blood chemistry extracts more oxygen and faster due to high red blood cell count, and high concentrations of myoglobin in the muscles stores more oxygen for availability during a dive. They also have a relatively high tolerance to carbon dioxide which builds up during breath-hold, and lactic acid, produced by anaerobic muscle work. The lungs and ribs are collapsible, allowing them to collapse without damage under the pressure of great depths They do not have air-filled sinuses in the facial bones.

There are differences in the diving strategies of marine mammals, which vary both with depth range and taxonomic grouping. Some of these remain inadequately explained. Some, such as Cuvier's beaked whale, routinely exceed their aerobic dive limit, making a relatively long recovery period necessary, while others, like elephant seals, appear to require very little recovery time between dives to similar depth, indicating that they tend to remain within their aerobic limits on almost all dives.

Many aquatic mammals such as seals and whales dive after full or partial exhalation, which would reduce the amount of nitrogen available to saturate the tissues by 80 to 90%. Aquatic mammals are also less sensitive to low alveolar oxygen concentrations and high carbon dioxide concentrations than purely terrestrial mammals. Seals, whales and porpoises have slower respiratory rates and larger tidal volume to total lung capacity ratio than land animals which gives them a large exchange of gas during each breath and compensates for low respiratory rate. This allows greater utilisation of available oxygen and reduced energy expenditure. In seals, bradycardia of the diving reflex reduces heart rate to about 10% of the resting level at the start of a dive.

Deep diving mammals do not rely on increased lung volume to increase oxygen stores. The whales with long and deep diving capabilities have relatively small lung volumes which collapse during the dive, and seals dive following partial exhalation with a similar effect. Short duration diving mammals have lung volumes similar to their terrestrial equivalents and dive with full lungs, using the contents as an oxygen store. The oxygen affinity of the blood is related to lung volume. Where the lungs do not represent an oxygen store, the oxygen affinity is low to maximise the unloading of oxygen and to maintain a high tissue oxygen tension. Where the lungs are utilised as an oxygen store, the affinity is high and maximises uptake of oxygen from the alveolar volume.

Adaptation of oxygen storage capacity of blood and muscle in diving mammals is an important factor in their diving endurance, and ranges from roughly equivalent to terrestrial mammals to nearly ten times as much, in proportion to the duration of dives and the metabolic demand during dives.

Swimming adaptations of drag reduction by hydrodynamically streamlined body forms and efficient swimming actions and appendages reduce the amount of energy expended in the diving, hunting and surfacing activity.

Heat loss is controlled by reducing the surface to volume ratio, and thick insulating layers of blubber and/or fur, which also help with streamlining for reduced drag. Exposed areas with relatively high circulation may use a rete mirabile counterflow heat exchange system of blood vessels to reduce heat loss.

Marine mammals use sound to communicate underwater, and many species use echolocation to navigate and locate prey. Pinnipeds and fissipeds have facial whiskers capable of locating prey by detecting vibrations in the water.

The hearts of marine mammals are typical of mammals. The heart is a slightly lower percentage of body mass in the great whales compared to pinnipeds and smaller cetaceans. Chamber size, stroke volume, resting cardiac output and heart rate are also in the general mammalian range, but the hearts of diving mammals are dorso-ventrally flattened, with enlarged right ventricular chambers, and, in some species, the thickness of the right ventricular wall may be increased. The dorso-ventral flattening prevents chest compression from compromising filling, and thicker walls may compensate for the effects of increased vascular resistance and lung collapse during chest compression.

Dense innervation of arteries in seals by sympathetic nerves may be part of a system for maintaining vasoconstriction of the dive response independent of local metabolite induced vasodilation. Venous capacitance is highly developed, especially in phocid seals and whales, and includes a large hepatic sinus and posterior vena cava, and is thought to be related to the large blood volume of the animals. The relatively large spleen also injects extremely high hematocrit blood into the hepatic sinus during dives and is a significant storage organ for red blood cells.

Parallel counter-flowing arteries and veins characteristic of countercurrent exchange units are present in the dorsal fins, flukes, and flippers of cetaceans, and are considered to conserve body heat by transferring it to the returning venous flow before arterial blood is exposed to the high heat-loss areas. There is also a superficial venous system by which excess heat can be dissipated to the surroundings.

The ascending aorta of pinnipeds is dilated to form an elastic aortic bulb which can hold the stroke volume of the heart and is thought to function as a hydraulic accumulator, to maintain blood pressure and flow during the long diastole of bradycardia, which is critical to the perfusion of the brain and heart, and compensates for the high resistance of the circulatory system due to vasoconstriction.

Retia mirabilia are networks of anastomosing arteries and veins and are found in cetaceans and sirenians. Their function is not altogether clear and may involve windkessel functions, intrathoracic vascular engorgement to prevent lung squeeze, thermoregulation, and the trapping of gas bubbles in the blood.

In most pinnipeds, there is a striated muscle sphincter at the level of the diaphragm around the posterior vena cava, innervated by the right phrenic nerve, and located cranial to the large hepatic sinus and inferior vena cava, which is most developed in phocid seals. The function of this sphincter is considered to be the regulation of venous return during bradycardia. Some whales also have a sphincter of the vena cava, and some cetaceans have smooth muscle sphincters around the intrahepatic parts of the portal vein. The precise function of these structures is not well understood.

=== Pinnipeds ===
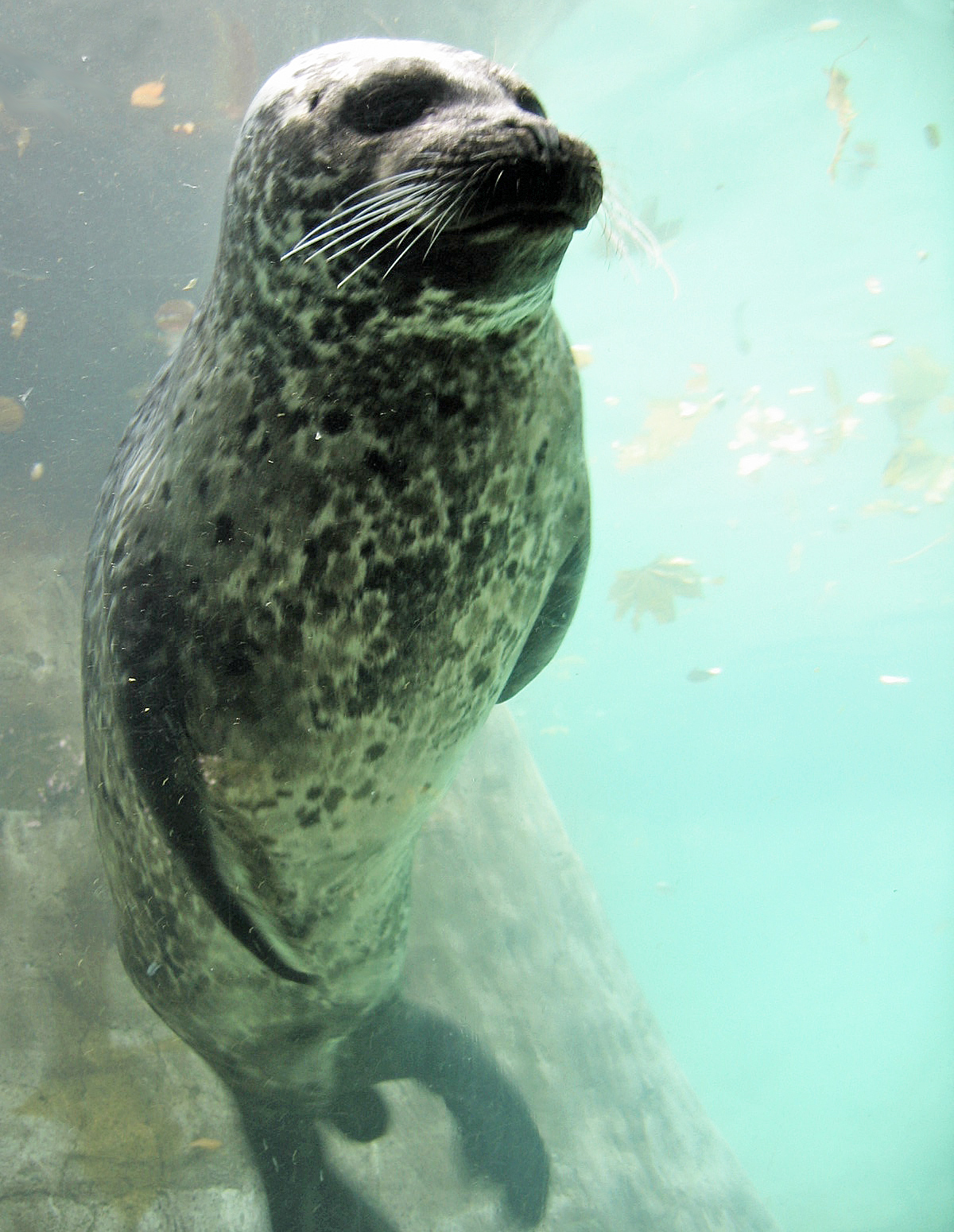
Harbour seal

Pinnipeds are carnivorous, fin-footed, semiaquatic marine mammals comprising the Odobenidae (walrus), Otariidae (the eared seals: sea lions and fur seals), and Phocidae (the earless seals, or true seals). There are 33 extant species of pinnipeds.

Two adaptations help seals to extend their time underwater. Oxygen storage capacity is greater than that of terrestrial mammals. They have more blood volume per body mass and greater numbers of red cells per blood volume. Muscle myoglobin is up to twenty times more concentrated than in terrestrial mammals.

Before diving, pinnipeds typically exhale to empty their lungs of half the air and then close their nostrils and throat cartilages to protect the trachea. Their unique lungs have airways that are highly reinforced with cartilaginous rings and smooth muscle, and alveoli that completely deflate during deeper dives. While terrestrial mammals are generally unable to empty their lungs, pinnipeds can reinflate their lungs even after complete respiratory collapse. The middle ear contains sinuses that probably fill with blood during dives, preventing middle ear squeeze. The heart of a seal is moderately flattened to allow the lungs to deflate. The trachea is flexible enough to collapse under pressure. During deep dives, any remaining air in their bodies is stored in the bronchioles and trachea, which prevents them from experiencing decompression sickness, oxygen toxicity and nitrogen narcosis. In addition, seals can tolerate large amounts of lactic acid, which reduces skeletal muscle fatigue during intense physical activity.

The main adaptations of the pinniped circulatory system for diving are the enlargement and increased complexity of veins to increase their capacity. Retia mirabilia forms blocks of tissue on the inner wall of the thoracic cavity and the body periphery. These tissue masses, which contain extensive contorted spirals of arteries and thin-walled veins, act as blood reservoirs that increase oxygen stores for use during diving. As with other diving mammals, pinnipeds have high amounts of hemoglobin and myoglobin stored in their blood and muscles. This allows them to stay submerged for long periods of time while still having enough oxygen. Deep-diving species such as elephant seals have blood volumes that makeup to 20% of their body weight. When diving, they reduce their heart rate and maintain blood flow only to the heart, brain and lungs. To keep their blood pressure stable, phocids have an elastic aorta that dissipates some energy of each heartbeat.

Pinnipeds have vascular sinuses in the middle ear which can fill with blood and reduce the volume of the air space and susceptibility to barotrauma, and have lungs and rib-cages which can almost completely collapse without injury, and in a sequence that removes the air from the alveoli relatively early in the dive.

==== Phocid seals ====
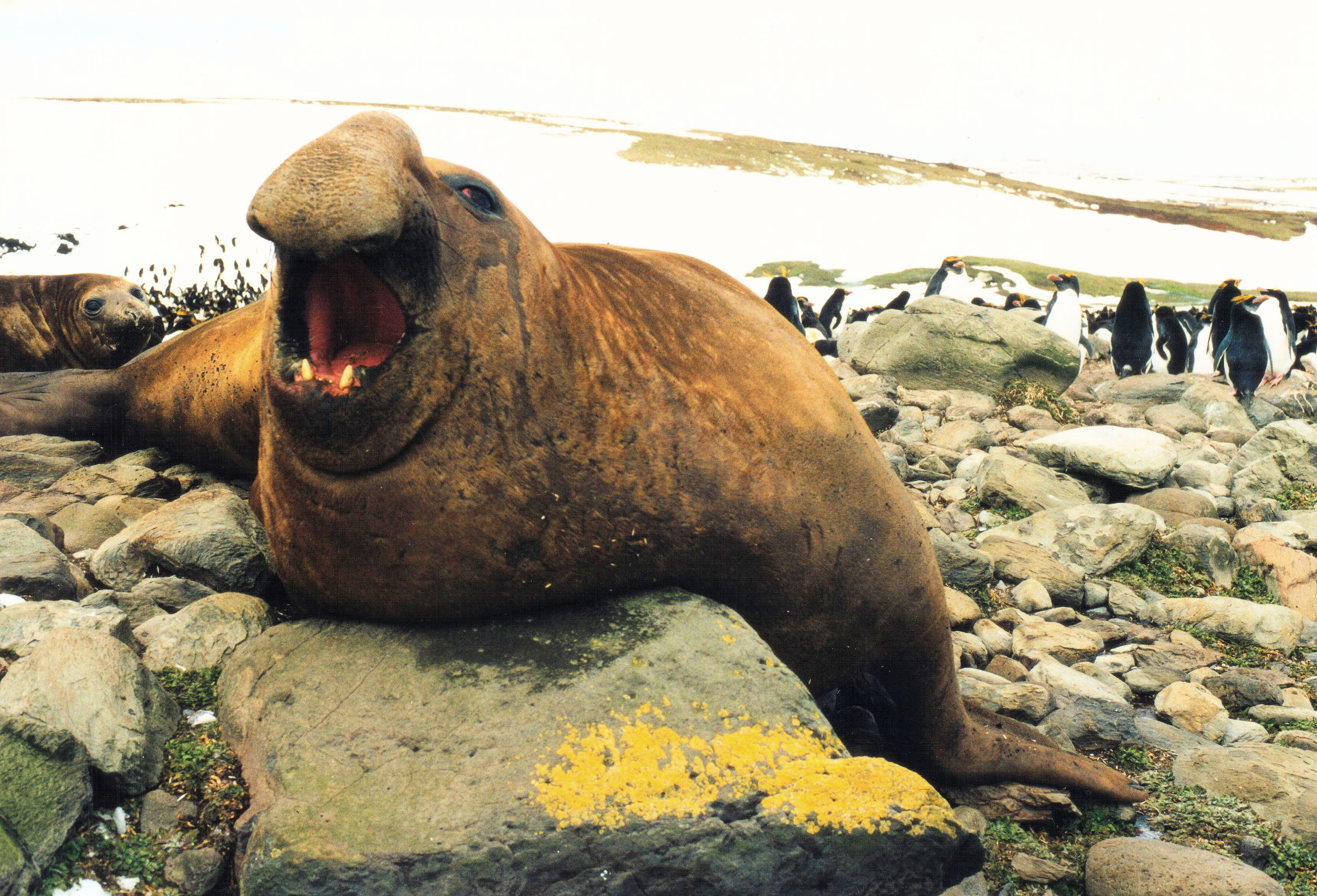
Male Southern elephant seal

Southern elephant seals (Mirounga leonina) can dive as deep as 2000 m and stay underwater for as long as 120 min, which means that they are subjected to hydrostatic pressures of more than 200 atmospheres, but hydrostatic pressure is not a major problem, as at depths below about 100 m, depending on the species, the lungs and other air spaces have collapsed and for practical purposes, the animal will be incompressible, so that further increases in-depth pressure no longer have much effect. The tympanic membranes of the deep-diving hooded seal are protected by the cavernous tissue in the middle ear, which expands to fill the air space.

At great depths, the animal must also avoid the narcotic effects of extreme tissue nitrogen tension, oxygen poisoning and similar effects. The collapse of the lungs under pressure has an advantage, as because the airways are reinforced with more cartilage than usual, which extends to the openings of the alveolar sacs, the alveoli will collapse first under pressure which pushes the alveolar air into the airways where there is no gas exchange, and this reduces the nitrogen loading of the tissues to only part of a single breath per dive. The nitrogen loads may still build up to some extent over several consecutive dives, but this is greatly reduced in comparison with a human diver continuously breathing under pressure.

Except for technologically aided humans, air-breathing animals have to stop breathing during a dive, so the arterial oxygen content continuously decreases and the arterial carbon dioxide content continuously increases while no fresh air is available. The urge to breathe is primarily based on carbon dioxide concentration, and ventilatory response to increased carbon dioxide is known to be lower in seals than terrestrial mammals. This suppresses the urge to breathe, which is one aspect of increasing breath-hold duration. The other and more critical aspect is to have as much oxygen available as possible at the start of the dive, to use it economically throughout the dive, and to have sufficient oxygen available to sustain consciousness until the end of the dive when it can be replenished.

Phocid seals do not have particularly large lung volumes, and they normally exhale at the start of a dive to reduce buoyancy and avoid nitrogen uptake under pressure. The lungs progressively collapse during the dive, starting with the alveoli, where gas exchange takes place, and re-expand during the ascent, so some gas exchange may be possible even before surfacing. Blood shunted through the lungs during the deeper part of the dive undergoes little gas exchange. The surfactants in the lungs not only reduce surface tension but also reduce adhesion of the collapsed inner surfaces allowing easier re-expansion during the final phase of ascent.

The blood volume of seals is proportionately larger than terrestrial mammals, and the haemoglobin content is very high. This makes the oxygen-carrying capacity and the blood oxygen store very high, but it is not necessarily available at all times. Aortic haemoglobin concentration has been observed to rise in diving Weddell seals. High hematocrit blood is stored in the large spleen of deep-diving seals, and may be released into the circulation during a dive, making the spleen an important oxygen reservoir for use during a dive while reducing blood viscosity when the animal is breathing.

Seal muscle has a very high myoglobin concentration, which varies in different muscles and hooded seals have the capacity to store about six times as much oxygen as humans. Myoglobin has a considerably higher affinity for oxygen than haemoglobin, so if the muscles are perfused during a dive, the oxygen on the myoglobin will only become available when the oxygen level of the blood has been heavily depleted.

Although the hooded seal's mass-specific oxygen stores are about four times those of humans, it can dive 20 times longer. The oxygen stored is insufficient for aerobic consumption by all tissues, and differential distribution of blood oxygen store to the brain can allow less sensitive tissues to function anaerobically during a dive. Peripheral vasoconstriction largely excludes the skeletal muscles from perfusion during a dive, and use the oxygen stored locally in myoglobin, followed by anaerobic metabolism during a dive. When breathing again, the muscles are perfused and re-oxygenated, and there is a surge in arterial lactate for a short period until reoxygenation stabilises.

The problem of how the arteries remain constricted in the presence of increasing tissue pH due to intracellular lactate was found to be avoided by the ability to constrict arteries leading to the organs, rather than arteriole constriction within the organs as occurs in terrestrial animals. The vasoconstriction causes a large increase in resistance to flow and is compensated by a proportional reduction of heart rate to maintain a suitable blood pressure sufficient to provide the reduced circulation. A bulbous enlargement of the ascending aorta in seals has elastic walls and contributes to maintaining sufficient diastolic pressure during bradycardia.

The heart rate in seals may drop as low as 4 to 6 beats per minute to balance central arterial blood pressure with the large increase in peripheral vascular resistance. The bradycardia also contributes to a major reduction of cardiac workload, so that the reduced myocardial blood flow in diving seals is tolerable, and allows the heart to function in anaerobic metabolism without evidence of myocardial dysfunction.

Cerebral integrity in Weddell seals is maintained down to an arterial oxygen tension of 10 mmHg, which is much lower than the critical arterial oxygen tension of 25 to 40 mmHg at which impairment due to adenosine triphosphate production limitations are detected in brains of terrestrial mammals. Cerebral blood supply is well maintained to the end of a long dive, and glucose supply is fairly well maintained. Endogenous glycogen supplies are greater than in terrestrial mammals, but not large. In the deep-diving hooded seal neuroglobin levels are much the same as in terrestrial animals but are distributed differently, having greater concentrations in glial cells than in neurons, suggesting that glial cells may be more dependent on aerobic metabolism than neurons.

The brain is a major consumer of oxygen during dives, so reducing brain oxygen consumption would be an advantage. Controlled cooling of the brain has been observed in diving seals which are expected to reduce brain oxygen demand significantly, and also protect against possible hypoxic injury. The shivering response to brain cooling found in most mammals is inhibited as part of the diving response.

Renal blood supply during dives is also affected by selective arterial vasoconstriction and can drop below 10% of surface value, or be closed down altogether during prolonged dives, so the kidneys must be tolerant of warm ischemia for periods of up to an hour. Diving is associated with a large reduction to complete interruption of glomerular filtration and urine production in harbour seals.

During a dive, the blood supply to skeletal muscles in seals is almost completely shut off, and a massive buildup of lactic acid may occur, starting when the oxygen stored by the muscle myoglobin is used up, showing that the skeletal muscles rely on anaerobic metabolism for the latter part of long dives. This blood supply is restored on surfacing when the animal resumes breathing. Harbour seals, which dive for short durations, have a high capacity for aerobic metabolism in the swimming muscles, while Weddell seals, which are capable of very long duration dives, do not have aerobic capacities beyond those of terrestrial mammals. The high buildup of lactate in the skeletal muscles of seals during dives is compensated by a high buffering capacity, with a strong correlation between buffering capacity and myoglobin concentration, and between buffering capacity and muscle lactate dehydrogenase (LDH) activity. On resuming breathing, the muscles are reperfused gradually, which avoids excessive peaking of arterial pH.

The overall distribution of blood flow in seals during dives has been measured using radioactive microspheres. The studies show that most major organs, including kidneys, liver, gut, skeletal muscle, and heart, have severely reduced circulation, while the brain gets most of the residual blood supply. The details of the results vary between species and depend on the length of the dive and the diving capacity of the animals.

There are large vena cava and hepatic sinuses in which blood can be temporarily stored during a dive, controlled by a sphincter of striated muscle anterior to the diaphragm, which is controlled by a branch of the phrenic nerve. This sphincter prevents engorgement of the heart by constriction of the arteries through which the blood is shifted to the central veins, creating an oxygen-rich reserve of blood in the vena cava, which is released into the circulation in proportion to cardiac output. Towards the end of a dive, this reserve of venous blood may have a higher oxygen content than the arterial blood.

Apnea in seals is induced by stimulation of trigeminal and glossopharyngeal nerve receptors in the mouth. The consequent asphyxia stimulates peripheral chemoreceptors which induce increasing peripheral vasoconstriction and bradycardia. Conversely, if the peripheral chemoreceptors are stimulated by hypoxia while the animal is breathing, the ventilation, heart rate and vasodilation of skeletal muscles is increased.

Oxygen consumption during a dive can be reduced by about 70%, attributed to anaerobic metabolism and probably also cooling of the body.

Observations on seals diving unrestricted in open water indicate that bradycardia is not as common as laboratory work suggested. It appears that the animals respond differently to voluntary immersion compared to forced immersion, and when forced underwater and unable to predict the length of a dive, the seal would go into an emergency response against asphyxia with a strong bradycardia response. When the dive was at the option of the seal, the response was proportional to the time the seal intended to dive, and would generally remain in aerobic metabolism, which would require a far shorter recovery time and allow repeat dives after a short surface interval. Anticipatory tachycardia shortly before surfacing was also reported on voluntary dives.

When allowed to dive as they chose, Weddell seals would usually do a series of relatively short dives, with an occasional longer dive, and did not build up post-dive lactic acid in their arterial blood. This allowed very short recovery periods between dives, and a much longer total immersed time of up to 80% of the time underwater compared with anaerobic dives where the proportion of time underwater was greatly reduced. The length of time the seal can dive without arterial lactate buildup is termed the aerobic dive limit. It can be measured, but not reliably calculated. The large difference in oxygen affinity between haemoglobin and myoglobin does not allow the transfer of oxygen from muscle stores to blood for uses in other tissues, so for a dive to be fully aerobic, the blood flow to working muscles must be restricted so the oxygen on the myoglobin can be used locally, keeping the haemoglobin supplies for the vital organs, particularly the brain. this requires peripheral vasoconstriction which necessitates some degree of bradycardia.

On an intentionally long dive, circulation will be shut off to the muscles and viscera from the start of the dive, with profound bradycardia, and the blood oxygen is effectively reserved for the brain. The muscles use the oxygen from myoglobin, then switch to anaerobic metabolism, the same system used by seals on forced dives.

Usually, the seals use an intermediate process, where the most active muscles are shut off from circulation and use locally stored oxygen to avoid compromising the blood oxygen stores, which requires a limited degree of bradycardia to compensate for the increased peripheral vascular restriction, which makes attempts to calculate ADL impracticable, even if the available oxygen stores are accurately assessed.

==== Eared seals ====
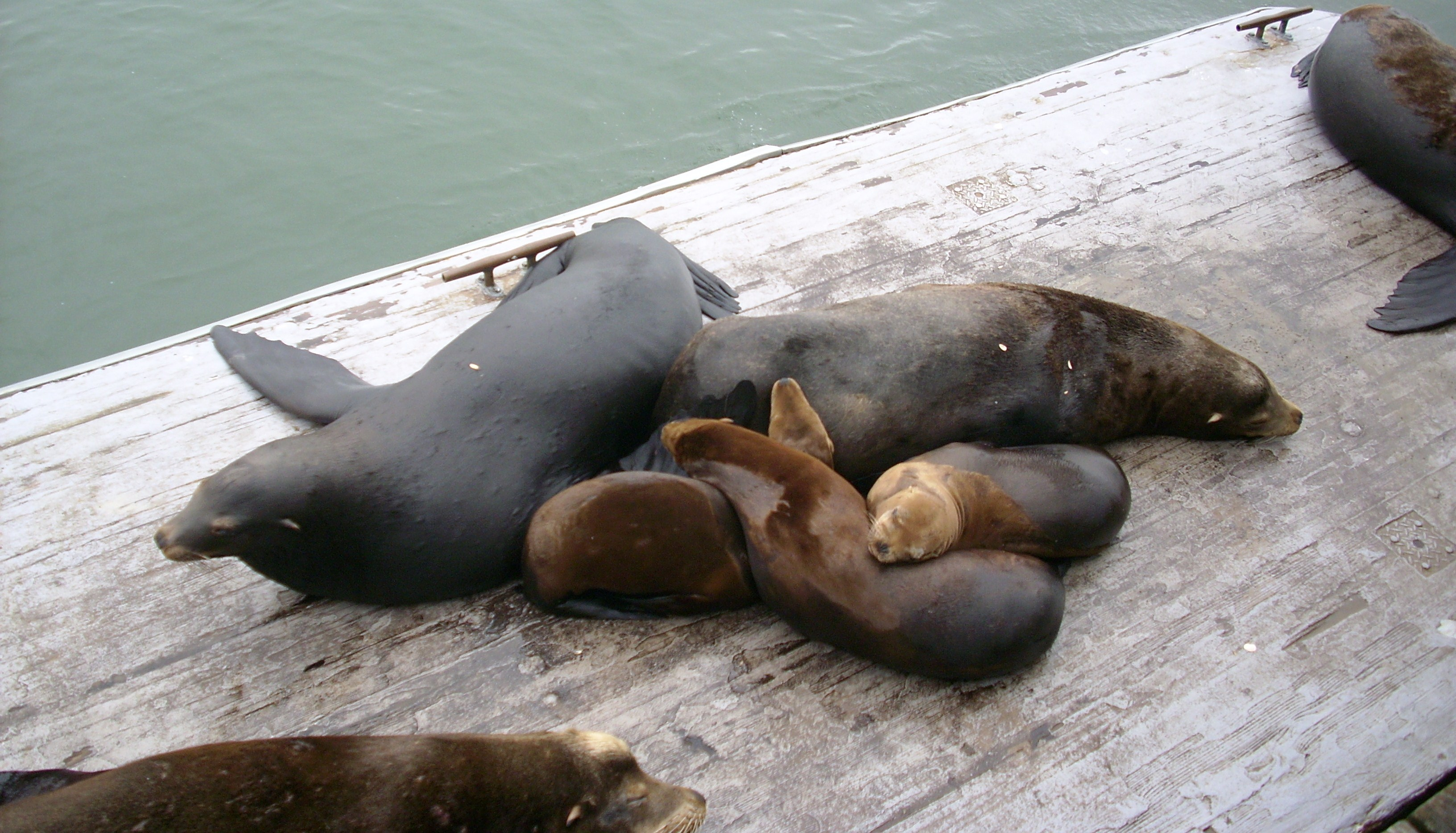
California sea lions

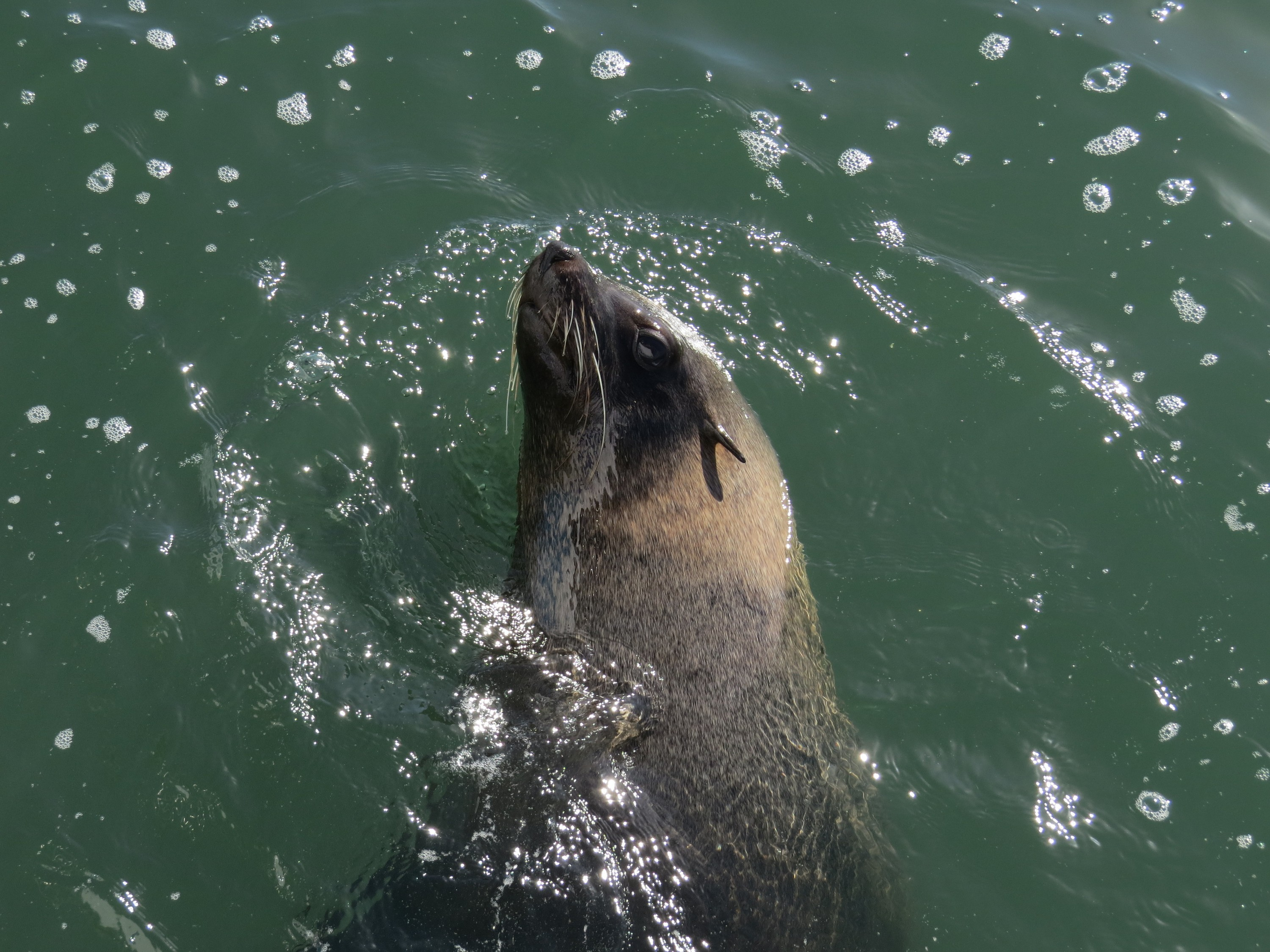
Eared seal off the Namibian coast

An eared seal is any member of the marine mammal family Otariidae, one of three groupings of pinnipeds. They comprise 15 extant species in seven genera and are commonly known either as sea lions or fur seals, distinct from true seals (phocids) and the walrus (odobenids). Otariids are adapted to a semiaquatic lifestyle, feeding and migrating in the water, but breeding and resting on land or ice.

Otariids have proportionately much larger foreflippers and pectoral muscles than phocids and have the ability to turn their hind limbs forward and walk on all fours, making them far more manoeuvrable on land. They are generally considered to be less adapted to an aquatic lifestyle since they breed primarily on land and haul out more frequently than true seals. However, they can attain higher bursts of speed and have greater manoeuvrability in the water. Their swimming power derives from the use of flippers more so than the sinuous whole-body movements typical of phocids and walruses.

Otariids are carnivorous, feeding on fish, cephalopods and krill. Sea lions tend to feed closer to shore in upwelling zones, feeding on larger fish, while the smaller fur seals tend to take longer, offshore foraging trips and can subsist on large numbers of smaller prey items. They are visual feeders. Some females are capable of dives of up to 400 m (1,300 ft) depth.

==== Walrus ====
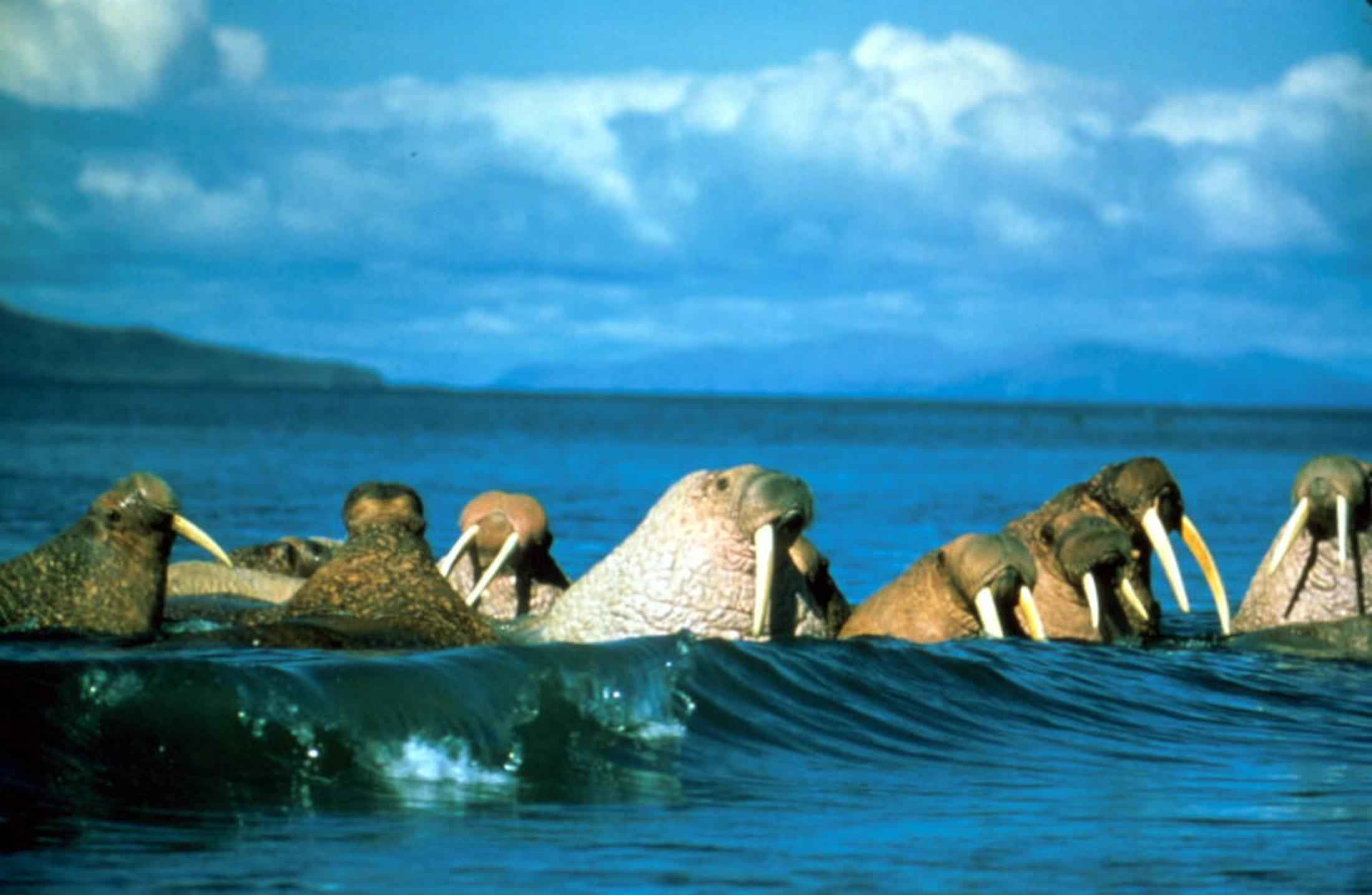
Walruses in shallow water

The walrus (Odobenus rosmarus) is a large flippered marine mammal from the Arctic Ocean and subarctic seas of the Northern Hemisphere. Adult walrus are characterised by prominent tusks and whiskers, and their considerable bulk: adult males in the Pacific can weigh more than 2,000 kg (4,400 lb)

Walruses prefer shallow shelf regions and forage primarily on the seafloor, often from sea ice platforms. They are not particularly deep divers compared to other pinnipeds; their deepest recorded dives are around 80 m (260 ft). They can remain submerged for as long as half an hour.

=== Cetaceans ===
The cetaceans are an infraorder of obligate aquatic mammals with 93 living species, in two parvorders. The Odontoceti, or toothed whales, are 73 species, including the dolphins, porpoises, beluga whale, narwhal, sperm whale, and beaked whales. The Mysticeti, or baleen whales, have a filter-feeding system, are fifteen species in three families, and include the blue whale, right whales, bowhead whale, humpback whale rorqual, and gray whale.

The wide range of body mass in cetaceans has a significant influence on the capacity for oxygen storage and use, which affects dive limits. The myoglobin content of the skeletal muscles varies considerably between species and is strongly correlated to the maximum diving duration on toothed whales. The combined effects of body mass and myoglobin content was found to account for 50% of the overall variation in cetacean diving performance and 83% of the variation in odontocete diving performance.

==== Beaked whales ====
The family of beaked whales includes some very cryptic and inaccessible animals, and they are considered to be deep-diving foragers mainly based on stomach contents. Tagging studies by Hooker and Baird, (1999) show that the northern bottlenose whale, Hyperoodon ampullatus, is capable of diving to depths more than 1500 m with durations of over an hour. Johnson et al., (2004) used acoustic recording tags to record echolocation clicks produced by Cuvier's beaked whale (Ziphius cavirostris) and Blainville's beaked whales (Mesoplodon densirostris) during dives of up to 1270 m depth, indicating that they use a series of regular clicks with occasional fast buzzing sequences during deep dives. It was concluded that both these species forage in deep water using echolocation.

Beaked whales, Ziphius cavirostris and Mesoplodon densirostris have been observed in natural circumstances to hunt in deep water by echolocation – Z. cavirostris to depths up to 1885 metres for durations up to 58 minutes. These deep foraging dives were in each case followed by a series of much shallower dives with no indications of foraging behaviour. The interval between foraging dives was long enough to indicate the high probability of recovery from an oxygen debt incurred by anaerobic metabolism. The foraging dives duration exceeded estimated aerobic dive limits by a factor in the order of two times. Reports of gas emboli in stranded beaked whales associated with naval sonar exercises have led to hypotheses that their diving profiles may make them vulnerable to decompression sickness, possibly exacerbated by high energy sonar pulses. The current models of breath-hold diving do not adequately explain the natural diving behaviour of these whales.

In beaked whales, the descent rate was consistently faster than ascent rate, at about 1.5 metres per second, regardless of dive depth, and at a steep angle of from 60 to 85 degrees, Fluke rate for Z cavirostris was higher at the start of the dive, but reduced by about 50 m depth, with a constant descent rate, consistent with buoyancy reduction due to lung compression.

Ascents from deep foraging dives were at a low vertical speed averaging 0.7 metres per second at a low angle. Mesoplodon ascent rates varied with dive depth, with a faster ascent associated with deeper dives giving a relatively constant overall ascent time. For Ziphius, the ascent strategy is unclear: they tend to ascend rapidly in the first few hundred meters from deeper dives then slow down around 500 m and speed up again near the surface. Both species began their ascent faster from deeper dives, but there was no clear correlation apparent between ascent speed and dive depth in the top 200 m of the ascent.

Fluke rate in both species for the last 40 m of the ascent was much lower than during descents which is consistent with the hypothesis that the final part of the ascent is largely powered by the buoyancy force of air expanding in the lungs.

Both Ziphius cavirostris and Mesoplodon densirostris, make long, deep dives to feed on a deep water source. Diving follows a distinct pattern with most deep foraging dives followed by a closely timed series of shallow dives and recovery near the surface. All foraging dives in these species appear to be much longer than the estimated aerobic dive limits, indicating that the whales generally return to the surface from them with an oxygen debt. It has been hypothesised that the series of shallow dives and the long periods between foraging dives are needed to recover from the oxygen debt in preparation for the next deep dive. The long intervals spent near the surface are considered to be inconsistent with the hypothesis that beaked whales are chronically supersaturated at high levels.

The similar times of descent and ascent of the shallow post-foraging dives do not appear to be consistent with requirements for recompression. The relatively slow ascents from foraging dives are not adequately explained. These ascents involve active swimming and no feeding, with the lowest ascent rate occurring below the depth of lung collapse, which does not seem likely to help prevent bubble formation, and by current models of nitrogen diffusion, may increase the risk of decompression sickness.

Analysis by Tyack et al. (2006) does not suggest that the beaked whales run a risk of decompression stress and embolism during normal diving behaviour. Houser et al. (2001) modelled nitrogen levels in the tissues of a diving bottlenose whale assuming lung collapse at a depth of 70 m and found that diving speed and depth are the main factors influencing tissue nitrogen accumulation. Dives with longer times at depths where the lungs were incompletely collapsed allowed greater in gassing and supersaturation. The in gassing rate of nitrogen depends on both the alveolar area exposed to the gas, which decreases with depth as the lungs progressively collapse, and the partial pressure gradient which increases linearly with depth, and is estimated to reach a maximum about halfway between the surface and the depth of complete alveolar collapse.

==== Sperm whale ====
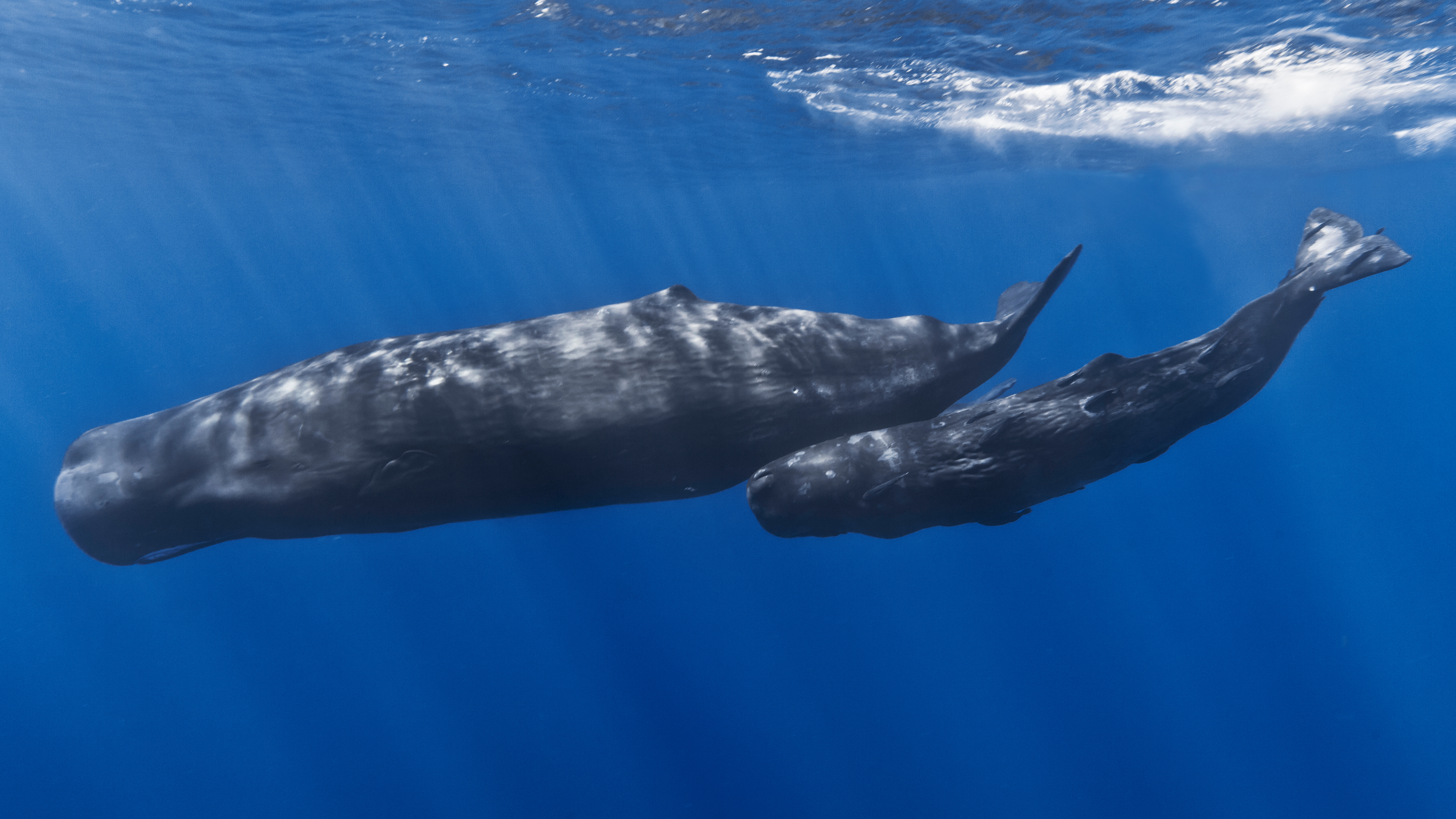
Mother and calf sperm whales

The sperm whale (Physeter macrocephalus) is the largest of the toothed whales and the largest toothed predator. It is the only living member of the genus Physeter and one of three extant species in the sperm whale family, along with the pygmy sperm whale and dwarf sperm whale of the genus Kogia.

The sperm whale respiratory system has adapted to cope with drastic pressure changes when diving. The flexible ribcage allows lung collapse, reducing nitrogen intake, and metabolism can decrease to conserve oxygen. Between dives, the sperm whale surfaces to breathe for about eight minutes before diving again. Odontoceti (toothed whales) breathe air at the surface through a single, S-shaped blowhole, which is extremely skewed to the left. Sperm whales spout (breathe) 3–5 times per minute at rest, increasing to 6–7 times per minute after a dive. The blow is a noisy, single-stream that rises to 2 metres (6.6 ft) or more above the surface and points forward and left at a 45° angle. On average, females and juveniles blow every 12.5 seconds before dives, while large males blow every 17.5 seconds before dives. A sperm whale killed 160 km (100 mi) south of Durban, South Africa, after a 1-hour, 50-minute dive was found with two dogfish (Scymnodon sp.), usually found at the sea floor, in its belly.

In 1959, the heart of a 22 metric-ton (24 short-ton) male taken by whalers was measured to be 116 kilograms (256 lb), about 0.5% of its total mass. The circulatory system has a number of specific adaptations for the aquatic environment. The diameter of the aortic arch increases as it leaves the heart. This bulbous expansion acts as a windkessel, a hydraulic accumulator, ensuring a steady blood flow as the heart rate slows during diving. The arteries that leave the aortic arch are positioned symmetrically. There is no costocervical artery. There is no direct connection between the internal carotid artery and the vessels of the brain. Their circulatory system has adapted to dive at great depths, as much as 2,250 metres (7,382 ft) for up to 120 minutes, with the longest recorded dive being 138 minutes long. More typical dives are around 400 metres (1,310 ft) and 35 minutes in duration. Myoglobin, which stores oxygen in muscle tissue, is much more abundant than in terrestrial animals. The blood has a high density of red blood cells, which contain oxygen-carrying haemoglobin. The oxygenated blood can be directed towards only the brain and other essential organs when oxygen levels deplete. The spermaceti organ may also play a role by adjusting buoyancy. The arterial retia mirabilia are extraordinarily well-developed. The complex arterial retia mirabilia of the sperm whale are more extensive and larger than those of any other cetacean.

==== Dolphins ====
Dolphin is a common name for aquatic mammals within the infraorder Cetacea. The term dolphin usually refers to the extant families Delphinidae (the oceanic dolphins), Platanistidae (the Indian river dolphins), Iniidae (the New World river dolphins), and Pontoporiidae (the brackish dolphins), and the extinct Lipotidae (baiji or Chinese river dolphin). There are 40 extant species named as dolphins.

Dolphins range in size from the 1.7 m (5.6 ft) long and 50 kg (110 lb) Maui's dolphin to the 9.5 m (31 ft) and 10 t (11 short tons) killer whale. Several species exhibit sexual dimorphism, in that the males are larger than females. They have streamlined bodies and two limbs that are modified into flippers. Though not quite as flexible as seals, some dolphins can travel at 55.5 km/h (34.5 mph). Dolphins use their conical shaped teeth to capture fast-moving prey. They have well-developed hearing which is adapted for both air and water and is so well developed that some can survive even if they are blind. Some species are well adapted for diving to great depths. They have a layer of fat, or blubber, under the skin to keep warm in the cold water. The thickness of the blubber layer can be limited by buoyancy constraints, as better insulation by a thicker layer of blubber can make the animal more buoyant than optimum for the energy costs of diving. This effect is more pronounced on smaller animals and juveniles where the surface area to volume ratio is greater.

Diving behaviour

The short-beaked common dolphin (Delphinus delphis) is known to forage at depths up to 260 m for 8 minutes or more, but mostly stays above 90 m for dives of about 5 minutes duration. The pantropical spotted dolphin (Stenella attenuata) can dive to at least 170 m, but most dives are between 50 and 100 m for between 2 and 4 minutes.

The long-finned pilot whale (Globicephalas melas) can dive to between 500 and 600 m for up to 16 minutes. Northern bottlenose whales dive to the seabed at 500 to 1500 m for more than 30 minutes, occasionally as long as 2 hours.

White whales (Delphinapterus leucas) frequently dive to depths between 400 and 700 m, with the deepest at 872 m. for an average duration of 13 minutes and maximum of 23 minutes, and with dive duration increasing with body size. Narwhals (Monodon monoceros) routinely dive to 500 m, and occasionally to 1000m or more, but mostly shallower.

In free-dives to depths of 60 m and 210 m, bottlenose dolphin heart rates dropped from a pre-dive average of 101–111 bpm to 20–30 bpm within 1 min of the start of the descent and averaged 37 and 30 bpm during the bottom phases the 60 m and 210 m dives. The dolphins' heart rates increased during ascent. The heart rates during a dive of these actively swimming dolphins were similar to heart rates of a sedentary dolphin at 2 m depth, showing that the heart rate response in diving dolphins is dominated by the diving response and not by an exercise response. During the final ascent, heart rates increased while fluke stroke rates decreased during periods of prolonged gliding towards the end of the dive. Lack of evidence for an exercise response does not necessarily imply that there is no muscle perfusion during diving, as earlier studies indicate elevated post-dive muscle nitrogen levels.

==== Baleen whales ====
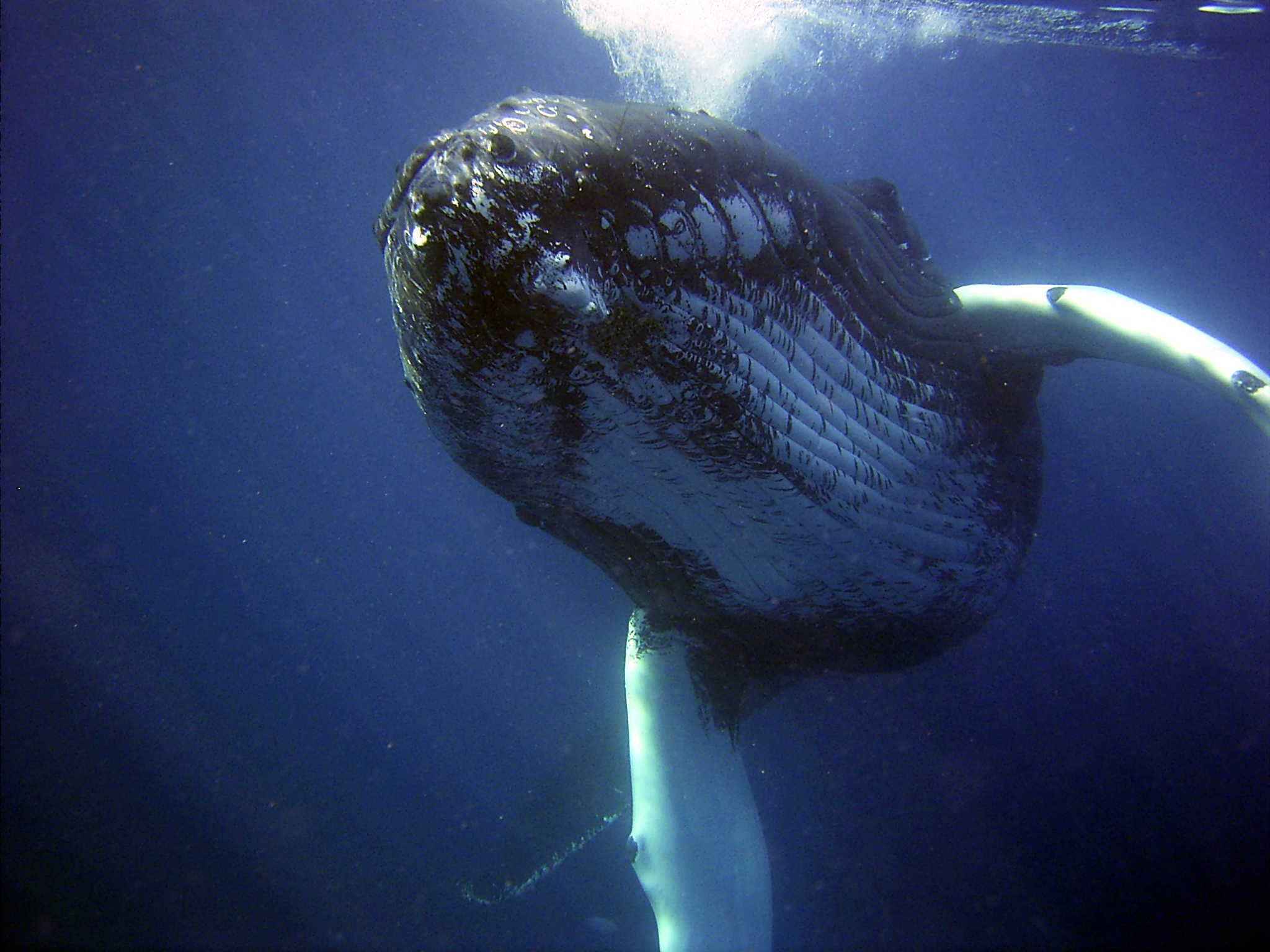
Humpback whale

Baleen whales, (systematic name Mysticeti, form a parvorder of the Cetacea. They are a widely distributed group of carnivorous marine mammals of the families Balaenidae (right and bowhead whales), Balaenopteridae (rorquals), Cetotheriidae (the pygmy right whale), and Eschrichtiidae (the gray whale). There are currently 15 species of baleen whales. Baleen whales range in size from the 6 m (20 ft) and 3,000 kg (6,600 lb) pygmy right whale to the 31 m (102 ft) and 190 t (210 short tons) blue whale.

When swimming, baleen whales use their forelimb flippers in a wing-like manner similar to penguins and sea turtles for locomotion and steering, while using their tail fluke to propel themselves forward through repeated vertical motion. Because of their great size, right whales are not flexible or agile like dolphins, and none can move their neck because of the fused cervical vertebrae; this sacrifices speed for stability in the water. The vestigial hind legs are enclosed inside the body.

Rorquals need to build speed to feed, and have several adaptions for reducing drag, including a streamlined body; a small dorsal fin, relative to its size; and lack of external ears or hair. The fin whale, the fastest among baleen whales, can travel at 37 kilometers per hour (23 mph). While feeding, the rorqual mouth expands by stretching the throat pleats to a volume that can be bigger than the resting whale itself; The mandible is connected to the skull by dense fibres and cartilage (fibrocartilage), allowing the jaw to swing open at almost a 90° angle. The mandibular symphysis is also fibrocartilaginous, allowing the jaw to bend which increases the area of the opening. To prevent stretching the mouth too far, rorquals have a sensory organ located in the middle of the jaw to regulate these functions.

Like all mammals, baleen whales breathe air and must surface periodically to do so. Their nostrils, or blowholes, are situated at the top of the cranium. Baleen whales have two blowholes, as opposed to toothed whales which have one. These paired blowholes are longitudinal slits that converge anteriorly and widen posteriorly, which causes a V-shaped blow. They are surrounded by a fleshy ridge that keeps water away while the whale breathes. The septum that separates the blowholes has two plugs attached to it, making the blowholes water-tight while the whale dives.

The lungs of baleen whales are built to collapse under pressure. enabling some, like the fin whale, to dive to a depth of −470 meters (−1,540 ft). The whale lungs are very efficient at extracting oxygen from the air, usually 80%, whereas humans only extract 20% of oxygen from inhaled air. Lung volume is relatively low compared to terrestrial mammals because of the inability of the respiratory tract to hold gas while diving. Doing so may cause serious complications such as embolism. Unlike other mammals, the lungs of baleen whales lack lobes and are more sacculated. The left lung is smaller than the right to make room for the heart. To conserve oxygen, blood is rerouted from hypoxia-tolerant-tissue to essential organs, and the skeletal muscles have a high concentration of myoglobin which allows them to function for longer without a blood oxygen supply.

The heart of baleen whales functions similarly to other mammals, and is proportional to the whale's size. The resting heart rate is 60 to 140 beats per minute (bpm). When diving, the heart rate will drop to 4 to 15 bpm to conserve oxygen. Like toothed whales, they have a dense network of blood vessels (rete mirabile) which prevents heat-loss. Like in most mammals, heat is lost in their extremities, so, the arteries are surrounded by veins to reduce heat loss during transport and recover heat transferred from the arteries to the surrounding veins as it travels back into the core in countercurrent exchange. To counteract overheating while in warmer waters, baleen whales reroute blood to the skin to accelerate heat-loss. They have the largest blood corpuscles (red and white blood cells) of any mammal, measuring 10 micrometers (4.1×10^{−4} in) in diameter.

Unlike most animals, whales are conscious breathers. All mammals sleep, but whales cannot afford to become unconscious for long because they may drown. They are believed to exhibit unihemispheric slow-wave sleep, in which they sleep with half of the brain while the other half remains active. This behaviour was only documented in toothed whales until footage of a humpback whale sleeping (vertically) was shot in 2014.

It is largely unknown how baleen whales produce sound because of the lack of a melon and vocal cords. In a 2007 study, it was discovered that the larynx had U-shaped folds which are thought to be similar to vocal cords. They are positioned parallel to airflow, as opposed to the perpendicular vocal cords of terrestrial mammals. These may control airflow and cause vibrations. The walls of the larynx can contract which may generate sound with support from the arytenoid cartilages. The muscles surrounding the larynx may expel air rapidly or maintain a constant volume while diving.

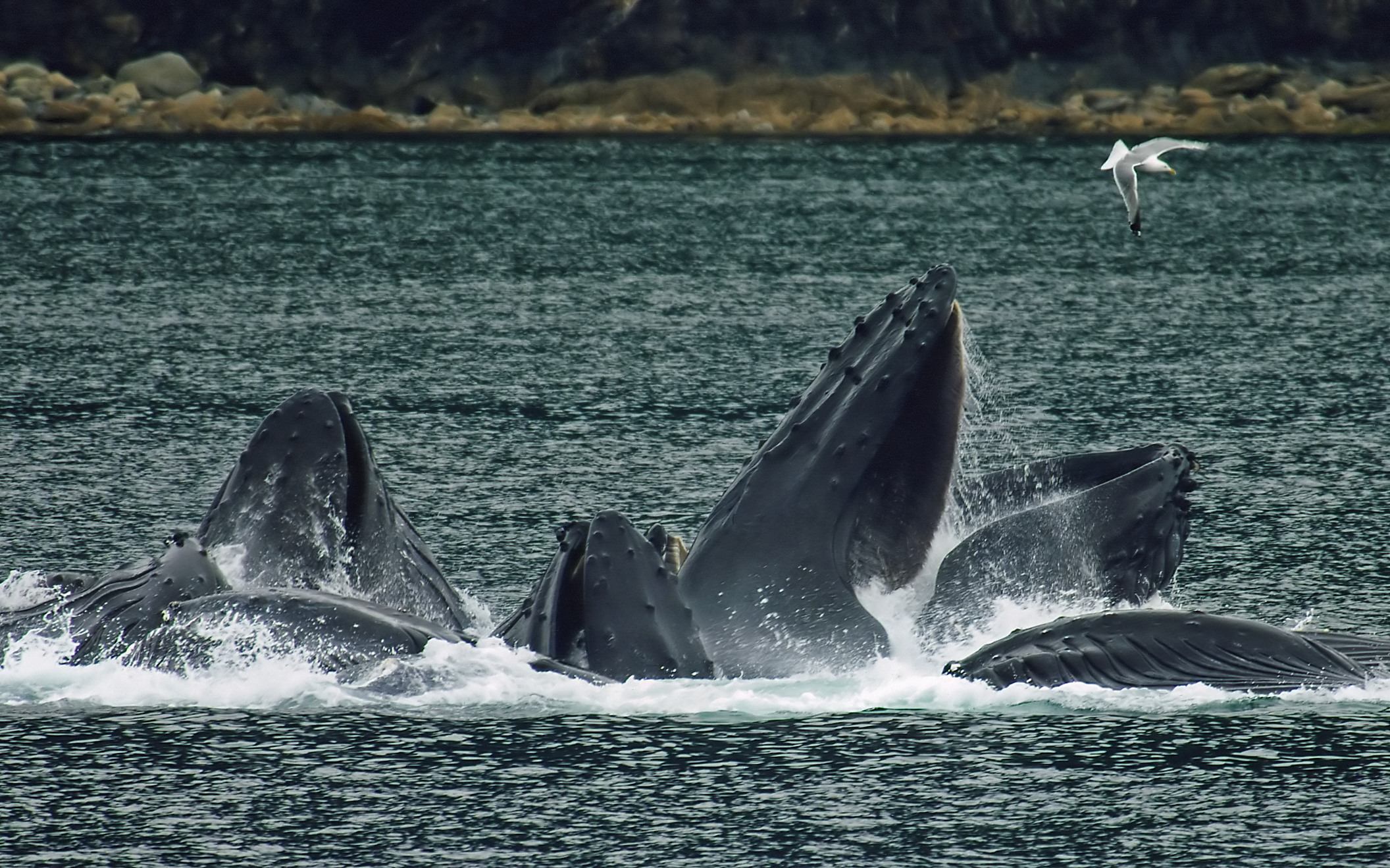
Humpback whales lunge-feeding in the course of bubble net fishing

All modern mysticetes are obligate filter feeders, using their baleen to strain small prey items (including small fish, krill, copepods, and zooplankton) from seawater. Despite their carnivorous diet, a 2015 study revealed they house gut flora similar to that of terrestrial herbivores. Different kinds of prey are found in different abundances depending on location, and each type of whale is adapted to a specialized way of foraging.

There are two types of feeding behaviours: skim-feeding and lunge-feeding, but some species do both depending on the type and amount of food. Lunge-feeders feed primarily on euphausiids (krill), though some smaller lunge feeders (e.g. minke whales) also prey on schools of fish. Skim-feeders, like bowhead whales, feed upon primarily smaller plankton such as copepods. They feed alone or in small groups. Baleen whales get the water they need from their food, and their kidneys excrete excess salt.

The lunge-feeders are the rorquals. To feed, lunge-feeders expand the volume of their jaw to a volume bigger than the original volume of the whale itself. To do this, the mouth inflates, which causes the throat pleats to expand, increasing the amount of water that the mouth can store. Just before they ram the baitball, the jaw swings open at almost a 90° angle and bends which lets in more water. To prevent stretching the mouth too far, rorquals have a sensory organ located in the middle of the jaw to regulate these functions. Then they must decelerate. This process takes a lot of mechanical work, and is only energy-effective when used against a large baitball. Lunge feeding is more energy-intensive than skim-feeding due to the acceleration and deceleration required.

The skim-feeders are right whales, grey whales, pygmy right whales, and sei whales (which also lunge feed). To feed, skim-feeders swim with an open mouth, filling it with water and prey. Prey must occur in sufficient numbers to trigger the whale's interest, be within a certain size range so that the baleen plates can filter it, and be slow enough so that it cannot escape. The "skimming" may take place on the surface, underwater, or even at the ocean's bottom, indicated by mud occasionally observed on right whales' bodies. Gray whales feed primarily on the ocean's bottom, feeding on benthic creatures.

Foraging efficiency for both lunge feeding and continuous ram filter feeding is highly dependent upon prey density. The efficiency of a blue whale lunge is approximately 30 times higher at krill densities of 4.5 kg/m^{3} than at low krill densities of 0.15 kg/m^{3}. Baleen whale have been observed seeking out highly specific areas within the local environment in order to forage at the highest density prey aggregations.

=== Sirenians ===
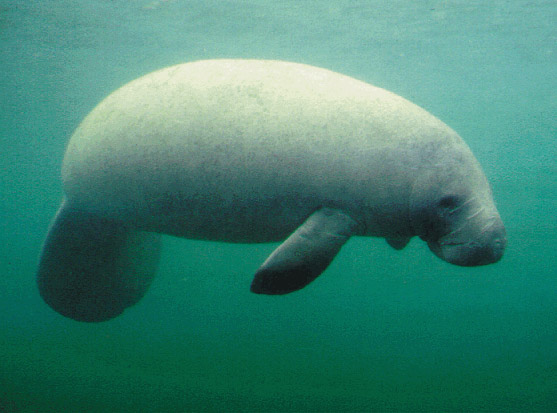
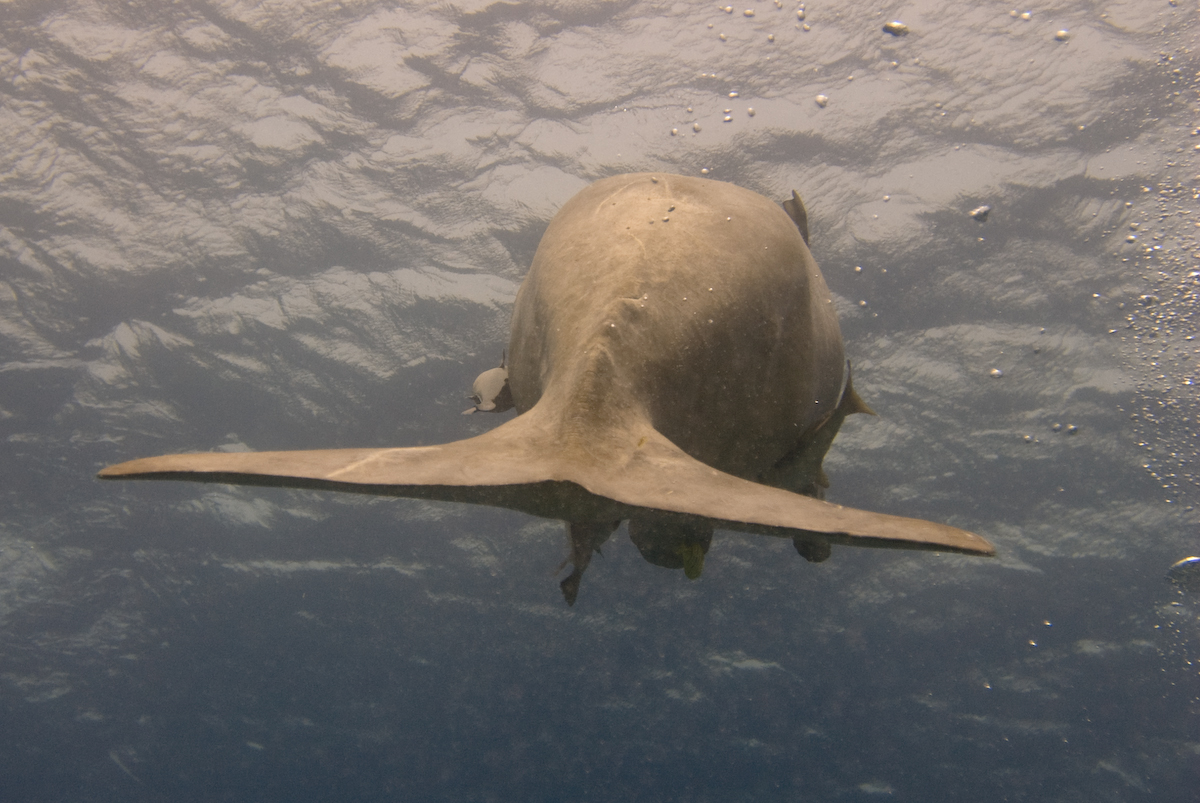
The paddle-shaped fluke of a manatee (left) vs. that of a dugong (right)

Sirenians are an order of fully aquatic, herbivorous mammals that inhabit swamps, rivers, estuaries, marine wetlands, and coastal marine waters. The Sirenia currently comprise the families Dugongidae (the dugong and, historically, Steller's sea cow) and Trichechidae (manatees) with a total of four species.

The tail fluke of a dugong is notched and similar to those of dolphins, whereas the tail fluke of manatees is paddle-shaped. The fluke is moved up and down in long strokes to move the animal forward, or twisted to turn. The forelimbs are paddle-like flippers that aid in turning and slowing. Manatees generally glide at speeds of 8 kilometres per hour (5 mph), but can reach speeds of 24 kilometres per hour (15 mph) in short bursts. The body is fusiform to reduce drag in the water. Like cetaceans, the hind limbs are internal and vestigial. The snout is angled downwards to aid in bottom-feeding. Sirenians typically make two- to three-minute dives, but manatees can hold their breath for up to 15 minutes while resting and dugongs up to six minutes. They may stand on their tail to hold their head above water.

Sirenians exhibit pachyostosis, a condition in which the ribs and other long bones are solid and contain little or no bone marrow. They have among the densest bones in the animal kingdom, which may be used as ballast, counteracting the buoyancy effect of their blubber and help keep sirenians suspended slightly below the water's surface. Manatees do not possess blubber, per se, but rather have thick skin, and, consequently, are sensitive to temperature changes. Likewise, they often migrate to warmer waters whenever the water temperature dips below 20 °C (68 °F). The lungs of sirenians are unlobed; they, along with the diaphragm, extend the entire length of the vertebral column, which help them control their buoyancy and reduce tipping in the water.

The body of sirenians is sparsely covered in short hair (vibrissae), except for on the muzzle, which may allow for tactile interpretation of their environment.

=== Carnivorans ===
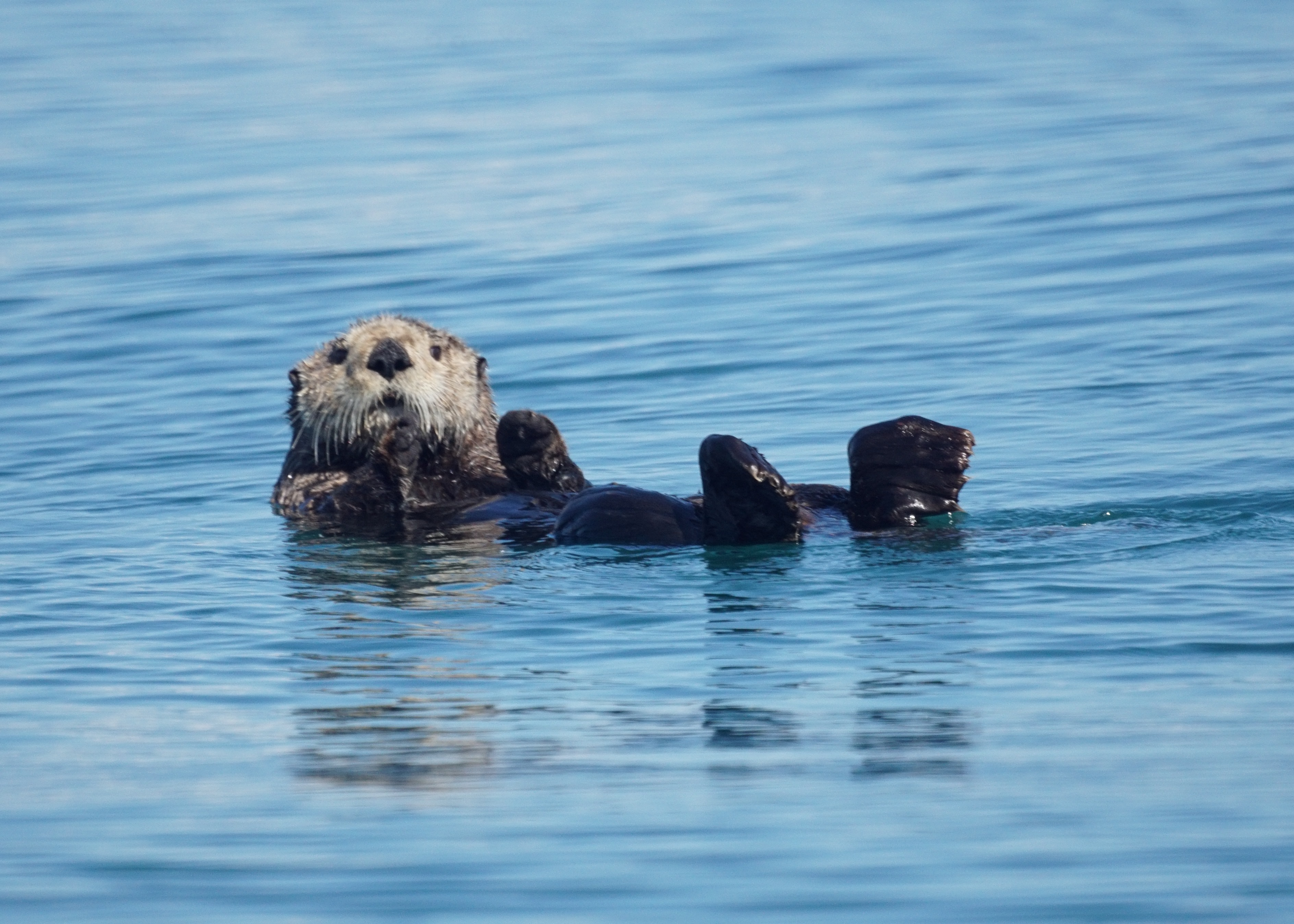
Sea otter

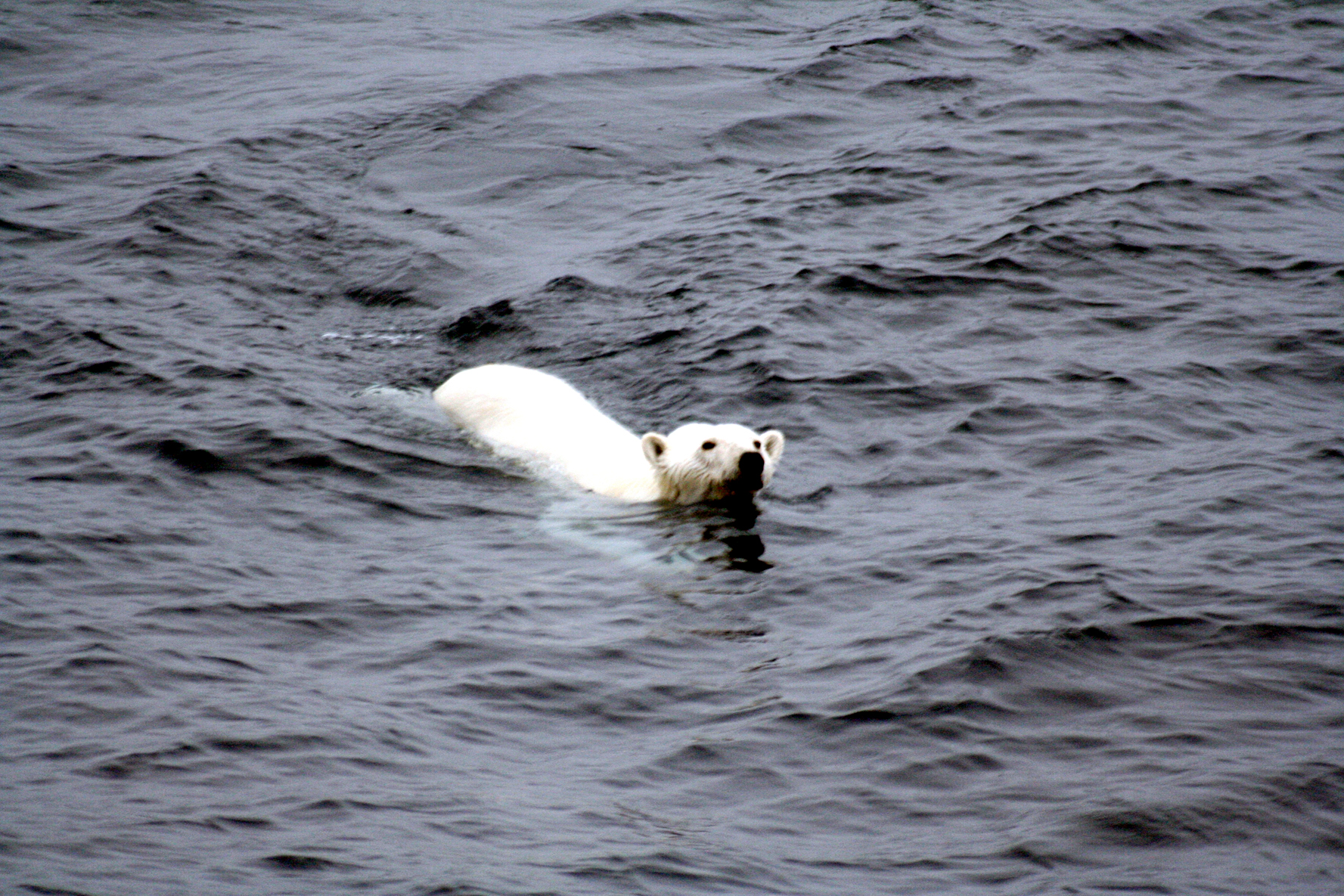
Polar bear swimming

The sea otter hunts in short dives, often to the sea floor. Although it can hold its breath for up to five minutes, its dives typically last about one minute and not more than four. It is the only marine animal capable of lifting and turning over rocks, which it often does with its front paws when searching for prey. The sea otter may also pluck snails and other organisms from kelp and dig deep into underwater mud for clams. It is the only marine mammal that catches fish with its forepaws rather than with its teeth.

Under each foreleg, the sea otter has a loose pouch of skin that extends across the chest. In this pouch (preferentially the left one), the animal stores collected food to bring to the surface. This pouch also holds a rock, unique to the otter, that is used to break open shellfish and clams. There, the sea otter eats while floating on its back, using its forepaws to tear food apart and bring it to its mouth. It can chew and swallow small mussels with their shells, whereas large mussel shells may be twisted apart. It uses its lower incisor teeth to access the meat in shellfish. To eat large sea urchins, which are mostly covered with spines, the sea otter bites through the underside where the spines are shortest and licks the soft contents out of the urchin's shell.

The sea otter's use of rocks when hunting and feeding makes it one of the few mammal species to use tools. To open hard shells, it may pound its prey with both paws against a rock on its chest. To pry an abalone off its rock, it hammers the abalone shell using a large stone, with observed rates of 45 blows in 15 seconds. Releasing an abalone, which can cling to rock with a force equal to 4,000 times its own body weight, requires multiple dives.

Polar bears can swim long distances at sea and can dive for short periods. Researchers tracked polar bears with GPS system collarsand recorded long-distance swims up to 354 kilometres (220 mi), with an average of 155 kilometres (96 mi), taking up to ten days. A polar bear may swim underwater for up to three minutes to approach seals on shore or on ice floes while hunting.

== Diving birds ==
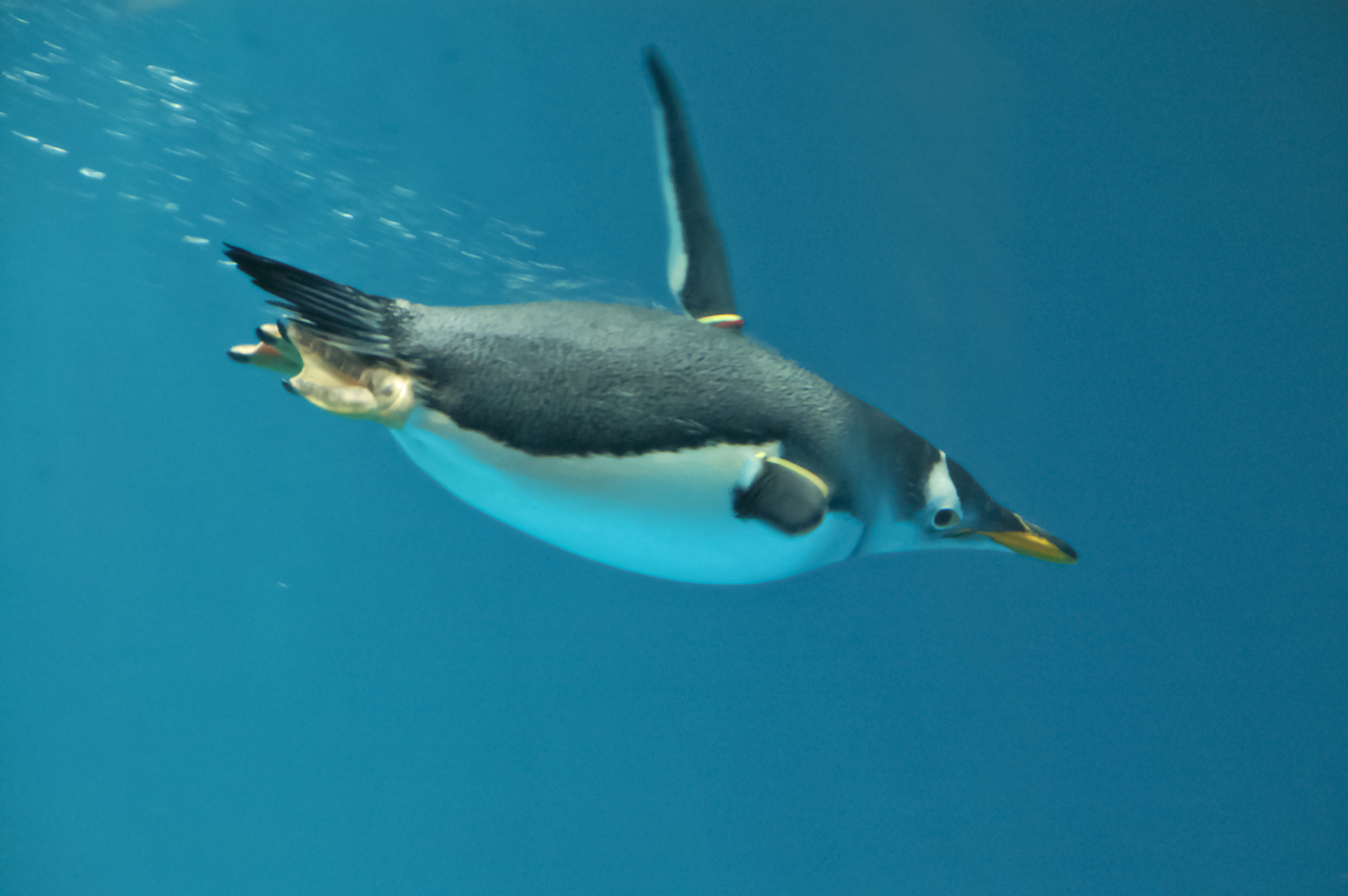
Gentoo penguin swimming underwater-8a

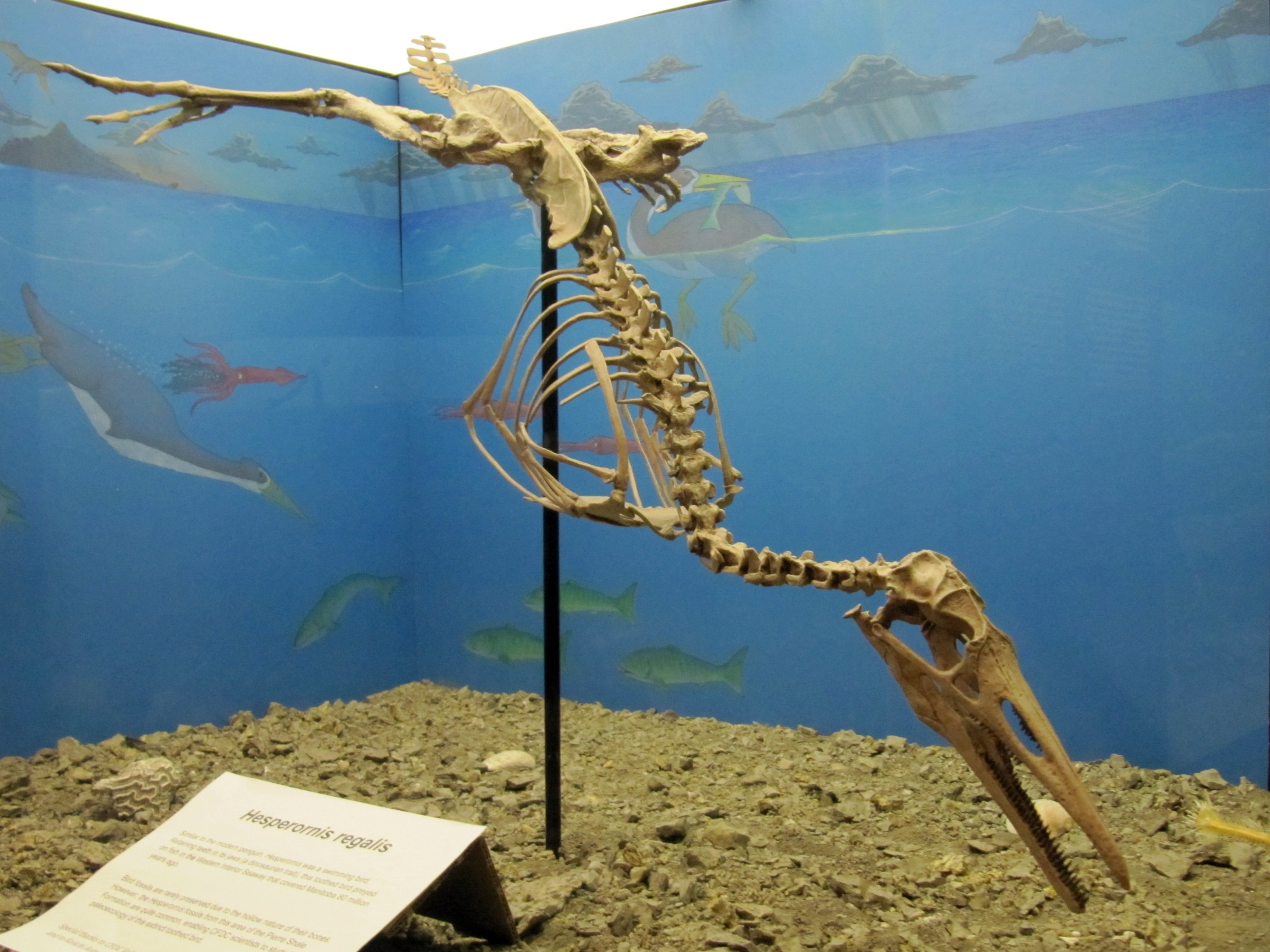
Restored skeleton of Hesperornis regalis

Aquatic birds are secondarily adapted to live and forage in water. Diving birds plunge into the water to catch their food. They may enter the water from the flight, as does the brown pelican and the gannet, or they may dive from the surface of the water. Some diving birds – for example, the extinct Hesperornithes of the Cretaceous Period – propelled themselves with their feet. They were large, streamlined, flightless birds with teeth for grasping slippery prey. Today, cormorants, loons, and grebes are the major groups of foot-propelled diving birds. Other diving birds are wing-propelled, most notably the penguins, dippers and auks.

Rapid onset bradycardia has been observed in diving birds during forced submersion, including penguins, cormorants, guillemots, puffins, and rhinoceros auklets. Perfusion of organs during bradycardia and peripheral vasoconstriction in forced submersions of ducks has shown similar findings to seals, confirming redistribution of blood flow to essentially the brain, heart, and adrenal glands. Heart rate during a free dive decreases from the pre-dive level but does not usually drop below the resting heart rate.

In free-diving cormorants, heart rate dropped at the start of the dive, and usually stabilized at depth, but increased again at the start of the ascent, with average heart rates during the dive much the same as at rest, but the variation in heart rate and vasoconstriction varies considerably between species, and true bradycardia occurs in emperor penguins on long-duration dives.

Birds display complex cardiovascular responses during free dives. Flighted diving birds with large respiratory oxygen reserves and low myoglobin concentrations tend to retain relatively high heart rates during dives, with a predominant exercise response for muscle perfusion. In more extreme dives a more classic diving response may occur with decreased heart rates and increased peripheral vasoconstriction. In penguins, which have smaller respiratory oxygen reserves but much larger myoglobin concentrations, heart rates during dives start high but progressively decline as dive duration increases. This high heart rate early in the dive continues gas exchange with the respiratory oxygen reserves. In emperor penguins, perfusion may be variable at the start of a dive, and muscle may or may not be perfused. Arterial-venous shunts may be opened to allow venous blood oxygen storage. Extremely low heart rates at the deepest part of the dive should limit nitrogen absorption, conserve blood oxygen, and increase aerobic muscle metabolism based on myoglobin-bound oxygen reserves.

Aquatic birds have to overcome the drag created between their bodies and the surrounding water while swimming at the surface or underwater. At the surface, the wave-making resistance will increase substantially when the speed exceeds hull speed, when the bow wavelength equals the length of the body in the water, so surface swimming bird seldom exceeds this speed. Wave making resistance dissipates with depth below the surface, making underwater swimming much less energy-intensive for well-streamlined diving animals.

About 60% of the diving effort of ducks is used to overcome buoyancy and 85% of the effort to remain at depth. About half of the air trapped in their feathers is lost. Birds that dive deeper tend to trap less air in the plumage, reducing their potential buoyancy, but this also represents a loss of thermal insulation, which can be compensated by subcutaneous fat, which increases body mass and thereby the energy cost of the flight. Penguins avoid this problem by having lost the power of flight, and are the densest of birds, with solid bones, short, closely packed feathers, and a substantial layer of subcutaneous fat, reducing diving effort expended against buoyancy. The reciprocating drag-based foot-propulsion in diving birds is less efficient than flapping of flipper-form wings, which produce thrust on both up and down-stroke.

=== Penguins ===
Emperor penguins regularly dive to depths of 400 to 500 m for 4 to 5 minutes, often dive for 8 to 12 minutes and have a maximum endurance of about 22 minutes. At these depths the markedly increased pressure would cause barotrauma to air-filled bones typical of birds, but the bones of the penguin are solid, which eliminates the risk of mechanical barotrauma on the bones.

While diving, the emperor penguin's oxygen use is markedly reduced, as its heart rate is reduced to as low as 15–20 beats per minute and non-essential organs are shut down, thus facilitating longer dives. Its haemoglobin and myoglobin can bind and transport oxygen at low blood concentrations; this allows the bird to function with very low oxygen levels that would otherwise result in loss of consciousness.

The energy costs of swimming at the surface and swimming underwater of penguins are lower than that of the more buoyant, less streamlined, and less propulsively efficient ducks, which swim on the surface using their webbed feet as paddles, whereas penguins swim just below the surface using their wings as hydrofoils. The energy cost of transport of a given mass of birds for a given horizontal distance at the surface is about three times greater for ducks than penguins. Ducks are very buoyant and the energy expended in overcoming buoyancy and staying at the bottom is the major part of the energy expended in diving. To remain within the calculated aerobic dive limit, the duration of the duck's dive must be short. On the other hand, Gentoo, king and emperor penguins have maximum dive durations between 5 and 16 minutes, and maximum depths from 155 to 530 m, which requires a diving metabolic rate equivalent to resting at the surface to dive within aerobic limits. The internal temperature of king and gentoo penguins drops during dives, which may reduce oxygen requirements.

== Aquatic reptiles ==
Marine reptiles are reptiles which have become secondarily adapted for an aquatic or semiaquatic life in a marine environment. Currently, of the approximately 12,000 extant reptile species and subspecies, only about 100 are classed as marine reptiles: extant marine reptiles include marine iguanas, sea snakes, sea turtles and saltwater crocodiles.

The earliest marine reptiles arose in the Permian period during the Paleozoic era. During the Mesozoic era, many groups of reptiles became adapted to life in the seas, including such familiar clades as the ichthyosaurs, plesiosaurs, mosasaurs, nothosaurs, placodonts, sea turtles, thalattosaurs and thalattosuchians. After the mass extinction at the end of the Cretaceous period, marine reptiles were less numerous, but there was still a high variety of species in the early Cenozoic, such as "true" sea turtles, bothremydids, palaeophiid snakes, a few choristoderes such as Simoedosaurus and dyrosaurid crocodylomorphs. Various types of marine gavialid crocodilians remained widespread as recently as the Late Miocene.

Some marine reptiles, such as ichthyosaurs, plesiosaurs, metriorhynchid thalattosuchians, and mosasaurs became so well adapted to a marine lifestyle that they were incapable of venturing onto land and gave birth in the water. Others, such as sea turtles and saltwater crocodiles, return to shore to lay their eggs. Some marine reptiles also occasionally rest and bask on land. Sea snakes, crocodiles and marine iguanas only dive in inshore waters and seldom dive deeper than 10 m.

=== Extinct taxa ===
Few data are available that show exactly how deep plesiosaurs dived. That they dived to some considerable depth is proven by traces of decompression sickness. The heads of the humeri and femora of many fossils show necrosis of the bone tissue, caused by nitrogen bubble formation due to a too rapid ascent after deep diving. However, this does not provide sufficient information to deduce a depth with any accuracy, as the damage could have been caused by a few very deep dives, or by a large number of relatively shallow exposures. The vertebrae show no such damage: they may have been protected by a superior blood supply, made possible by the arteries entering the bone through the two foramina subcentralia, large openings in their undersides.

Descending would have been helped by negative buoyancy, but this would have been a disadvantage when surfacing. Young plesiosaurs show pachyostosis, an extreme density of the bone tissue, which would have decreased buoyancy. Adult individuals have more spongy bones. Gastroliths has been suggested as a method to increase weight or even as a means to attain neutral buoyancy, swallowing or spitting them out again as needed. They might also have been used to increase stability.

=== Sea turtles ===
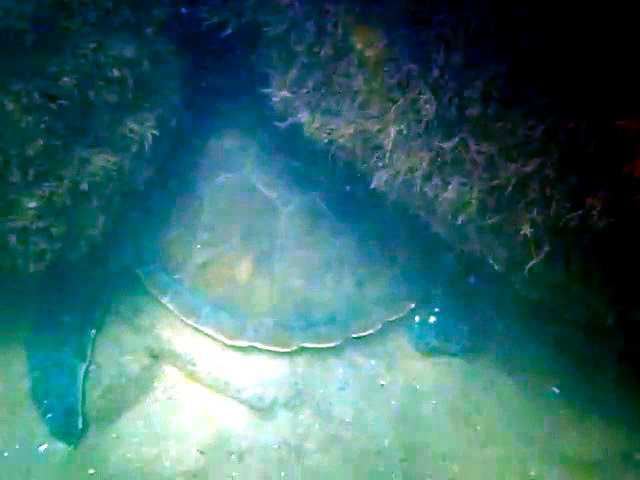
Green sea turtle resting under rocks in the Uruguayan Atlantic coast

Sea turtles, or marine turtles, are reptiles of the superfamily Chelonioidea, order Testudines and of the suborder Cryptodira. The seven existing species of sea turtles are the green sea turtle, loggerhead sea turtle, Kemp's ridley sea turtle, olive ridley sea turtle, hawksbill sea turtle, flatback sea turtle, and leatherback sea turtle.

As air-breathing reptiles, sea turtles must surface to breathe. They spend most of their time underwater, so must be able to hold their breath for long periods to avoid frequent surfacing. Dive duration largely depends on the activity. A foraging sea turtle may typically spend 5–40 minutes under water while a sleeping sea turtle can remain underwater for 4–7 hours. Sea turtle respiration remains aerobic for the vast majority of voluntary dive time. When a sea turtle is forcibly submerged (e.g. entangled in a trawl net) its diving endurance is substantially reduced, so it is more susceptible to drowning.

When surfacing to breathe, a sea turtle can quickly refill its lungs with a single explosive exhalation and rapid inhalation. Their large lungs permit rapid exchange of oxygen and avoid trapping gases during deep dives. Sea turtle blood can deliver oxygen efficiently to body tissues during diving. During the routine activity, green and loggerhead turtles dive for about four to five minutes, and surface to breathe for one to three seconds.

The deepest diving sea turtle is the leatherback which can reach 1250 m depth, while the record for the longest dive goes to loggerheads (Caretta caretta) in the Mediterranean at more than 10 hours. For many hard-shelled sea turtles, depths visited on average (i.e. outside of overwintering) range from 2–54 m; for leatherbacks, this ranges up to 150 m. The effect of temperature on sea turtles has been explored thoroughly and is shown to influence turtle metabolic rates, circulation and other physiological factors. Therefore, dive behaviour is presumed to shift based on needs for thermoregulation and in response to seasonal changes (longer dives with lower temperatures), although across species and regions the relationship between temperature and diving has differed and was only investigated in 12 of 70 studies reviewed. The review also describes that some turtles change dive behaviour based on whether they are transiting. For example, turtles tend to use shallow waters during transit, with occasional deep dives possibly for resting or foraging en route, with the exception of the leatherback that showed longer and deeper dives during transit. Importantly, dive behaviour differed based on habitat type and geography.

Turtles can rest or sleep underwater for several hours at a time, but submergence time is much shorter while diving for food or to escape predators. Breath-holding ability is affected by activity and stress, which is why turtles quickly drown in shrimp trawlers and other fishing gear. During the night while sleeping and to protect themselves from potential predators, the adults wedge themselves under rocks below the surface and under ledges in reefs and coastal rocks. Many green sea turtles have been observed returning to the same sleeping location over successive nights.

==== Leatherback ====
The leatherback turtle Dermochelys coriacea is the deepest diving extant reptile. The dive profile is consistent, with an initial phase of fairly steep downward swimming at about a 40° descent angle, stroking at about once in 3 seconds with the flippers, followed by a gliding phase, which starts at a depth that varies with the maximum depth of the dive, suggesting that the inspired air volume is chosen depending on how deep the turtle intends to dive, similarly to hard-shelled turtles and penguins. During ascent, the turtles actively swim at a similar stroke rate, but at a lower pitch angle of about 26°, giving a fairly low ascent rate of about 0.4 m/s, or 24 m/min. This may be a strategy to avoid decompression sickness. The relatively low body temperature is conjectured to help reduce the risk of bubble formation by providing a higher solubility of nitrogen in the blood.

Some marine mammals reduce the risk of decompression sickness and nitrogen narcosis by limiting the amount of air in the lungs during a dive, basically exhaling before the dive, but this limits the oxygen available from lung contents. As dive endurance is proportional to available oxygen, this strategy limits dive duration, and some animals inhale before diving. This increases decompression risk, and this may be behaviourally mitigated by limiting the ascent rate or spending fairly long periods at or near the surface to equilibrate between dives. The amount of air in the lungs at the start of the dive also influences buoyancy, and achieving near neutral buoyancy during the bottom phase may reduce the overall energy requirement of the dive.

==== Green turtles ====
Okuyama et al. (2014) found that green turtles Chelonia mydas maximised their submerged time, but changed their dive strategy depending on whether they were resting or foraging. They surfaced without depleting estimated oxygen reserves, followed by a few breaths to recover. Optimal foraging behaviour does not always completely use up the available stored oxygen. Termination of a shallow dive relatively early if no food is encountered could be energy efficient over long periods for animals that habitually spend more time submerged and only surface briefly to exchange gas, which is the case with turtles. Such "surfacers" are assumed to also maximize other benefits of their dives besides foraging, such as resting, mating and migration.

Sea turtles are ectothermic and have physiological functions well adapted for prolonged dives, in that their metabolism is significantly slower than that of diving birds and mammals, but their metabolism is not constant and is affected by water temperature and exertion. Voluntary dives are started with near saturation levels of oxygen and finished near depletion. Their lungs are highly elastic and reinforced, with a high oxygen diffusion capacity, allowing short surface breathing intervals. Respiration frequency depends on water temperature and the oxygen consumption of the previous dive. Turtles adjust the volume of inspired air to suit the buoyancy needs to be anticipated for each dive.

These turtles take more breaths after resting dives than after foraging and other dives. After resting dives, turtles surface with nearly depleted oxygen reserves but do not exceed the aerobic dive limit. They then start the next dive with saturated oxygen content, although the lung volume changes with the anticipated dive depth. This procedure allows them to maximise submerged time, reducing surfacing effort.

The tidal volume varies little between active and resting turtles, and does not appear to be affected by exertion and water temperature. Turtles appear to replenish their oxygen content to the saturation level before a dive but do not usually use all the available oxygen in foraging and other dives, so fewer breaths are needed for replenishment in comparison with resting dives.

Green turtles feed on seagrass in shallow water, generally less than 3 m deep, while most other dives occur during travel between the feeding ground and the resting place. During travel, turtles breathe while swimming, usually just one breath before submerging again. Surface swimming causes wave-making drag, and the animal must hold its head up in the air while breathing, causing more drag. Taking a single breath between dives while travelling appears to be energy efficient.

== Decompression sickness ==
Under the pressure of diving, lung gases in vertebrates diffuse into the pulmonary blood circulation and are carried to other tissues where they diffuse further according to gas tension gradients and perfusion rates. Ambient pressure increases with depth, so the amount of nitrogen that is absorbed by the blood and tissues increases also increases, producing higher dissolved gas tensions that would reach equilibrium with the partial pressure of nitrogen in the lungs given sufficient time. This problem has long been recognised for human divers breathing air at ambient pressure, but has not been considered to be a problem for breath-hold divers as they only have the air of a single inhalation per dive. For free-diving animals which can dive significantly deeper and for considerably longer, tissues can become relatively highly saturated depending on the process of loading during diving and washout between dives at the surface. During ascent, if the dissolved nitrogen in the tissues cannot diffuse back into the residual lung gas fast enough with the reducing pressure, tissues may become supersaturated, with potential for gas-bubble formation. Although small bubbles can form without apparent injury, the formation and growth of bubbles is generally considered a characteristic event in the development of decompression sickness.

Observations and theoretical modelling suggest that even in normal diving conditions, at least some marine mammals may have some nitrogen tissue supersaturation at the surface at times, implying that their diving adaptations are either insufficient or are not fully exploited, leading to questions of what causes this supersaturation, and whether it is a significant health threat.

== History ==
Originally, the study of diving was limited to observation of the behaviour from the surface. Since the 1930s experimental work provided insights into how air-breathing animals dive. and more recently, as remote sensing and recording methods such as sonar, capillary tubes, and microprocessor-controlled time and depth recorders (TDRs) and satellite-linked TDRs became available, the study of diving has expanded and diversified. The improved instrumentation has made more accurate and precise measurements of diving behaviour possible on a wide range of diving animals.
