= Vaginal lubrication =

Natural lubrication of the vagina during sexual arousal

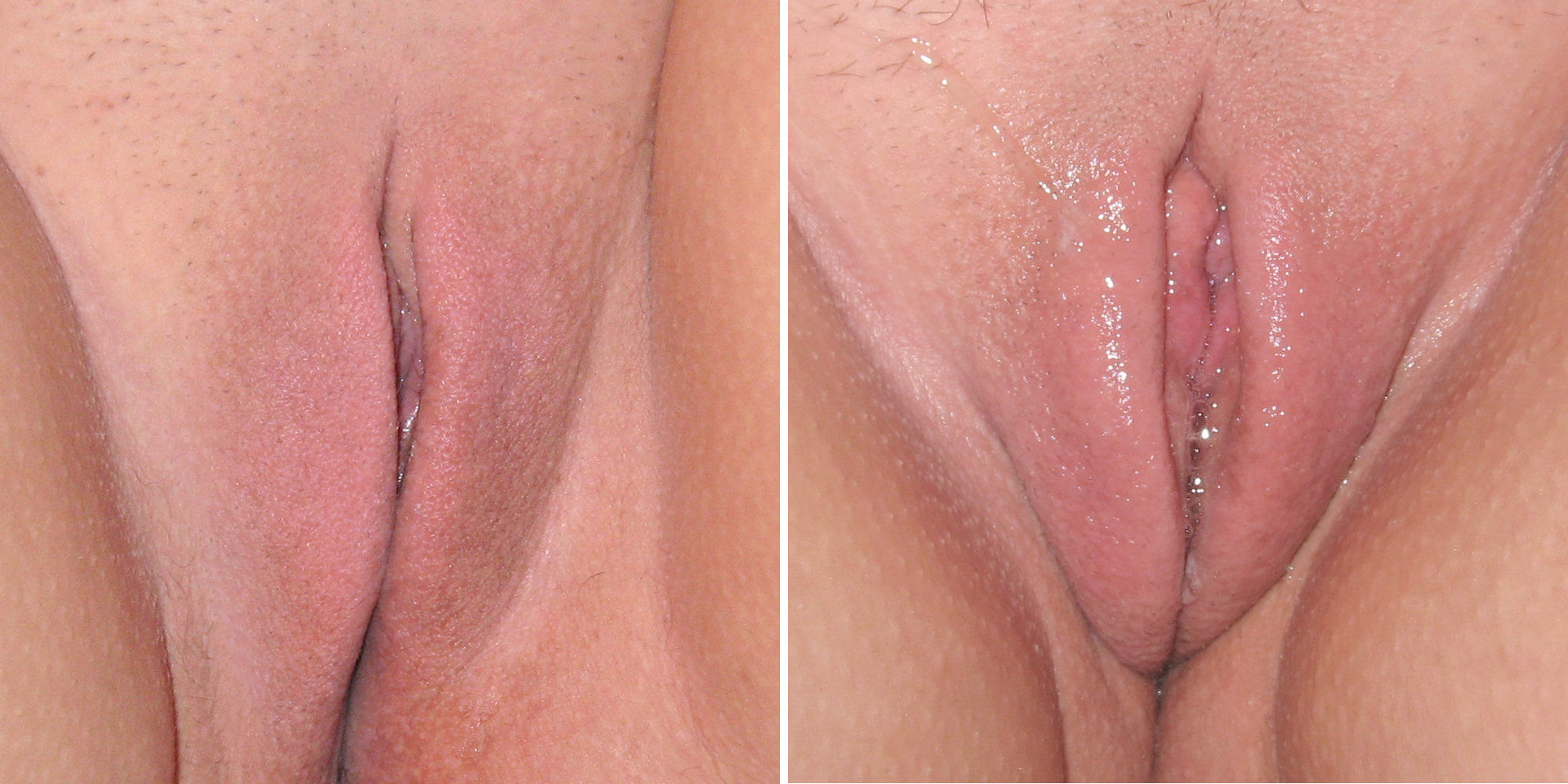
Left: The shaved vulva unaroused. Right: Vaginal lubrication sometimes becomes visible after sexual arousal.

Vaginal lubrication is a naturally produced fluid that lubricates the vagina. Vaginal lubrication production increases significantly during sexual arousal in anticipation of sexual intercourse. Vaginal dryness is the condition in which this lubrication is insufficient, and sometimes artificial lubricants are used to augment it. Without sufficient lubrication, sexual intercourse can be painful. The vaginal lining has no glands, and therefore the vagina must rely on other methods of lubrication. Plasma from the vaginal walls due to vascular engorgement is considered to be the chief lubrication source, and the Bartholin's glands, located slightly below and to the left and right of the introitus (vaginal opening), also secrete mucus to augment vaginal wall secretions. Near ovulation, cervical mucus provides additional lubrication.

== Mechanism ==
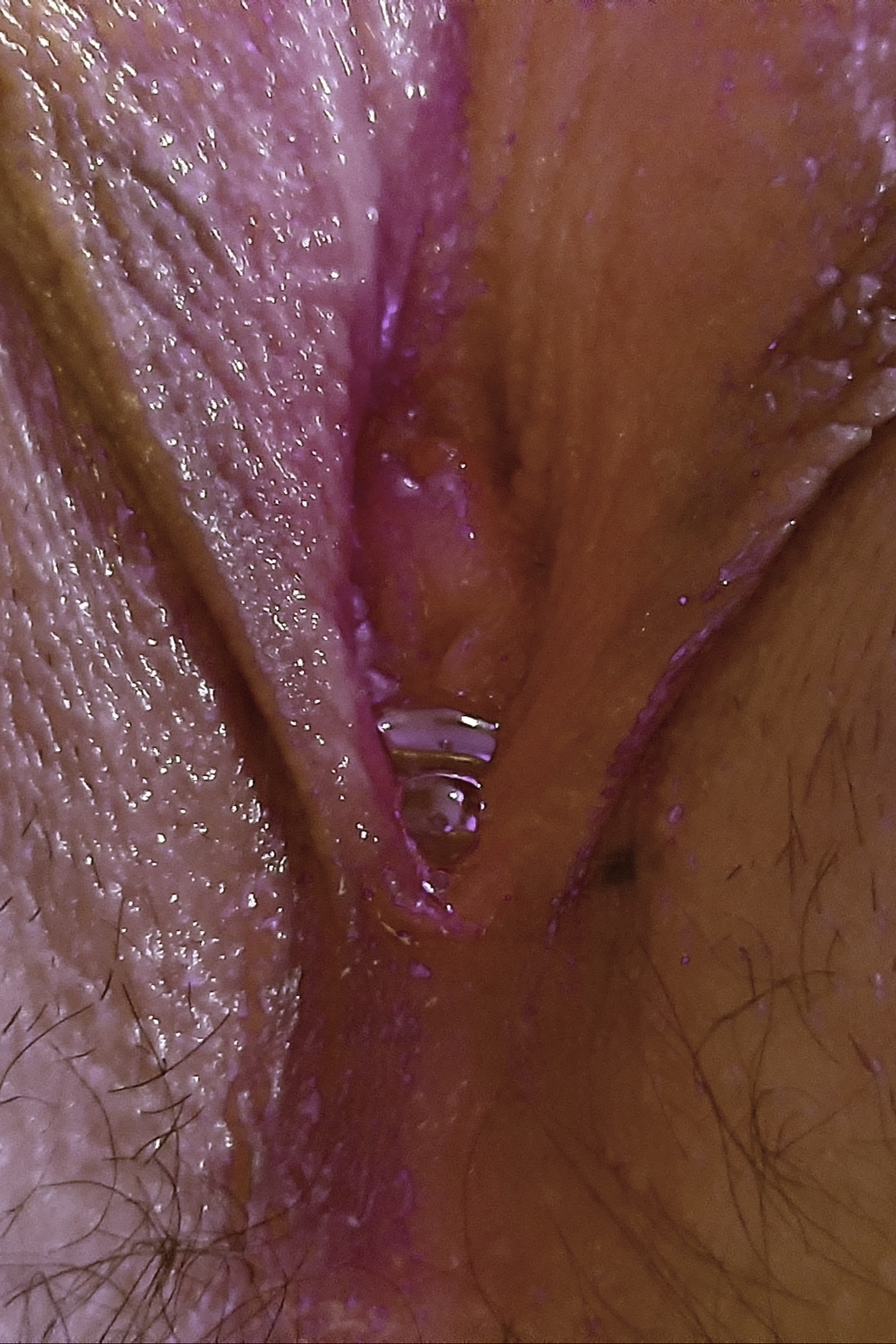
Vaginal introitus with visible vaginal lubrication during sexual arousal.

=== Composition ===
Vaginal lubrication fluid is a plasma transudate which diffuses across the vaginal wall. Composition varies with the length of arousal.

During arousal, vaginal lubrication, also sometimes called "arousal fluid", is produced. This is clear, thin, and slippery. It typically only lasts up to an hour. It can sometimes be confused with cervical mucus.

=== Production ===
The human vagina is serviced by nerves that respond to vasoactive intestinal polypeptide (VIP). As a result, VIP induces an increase in vaginal blood flow accompanied by an increase in vaginal lubrication. The findings suggest that VIP may participate in the control of the local physiological changes observed during sexual arousal: genital vasodilation and an increase in vaginal lubrication. Neuropeptide Y is also involved in producing it.

== Vaginal dryness ==
Insufficient lubrication or vaginal dryness can cause dyspareunia, which is a type of sexual pain disorder. While vaginal dryness is considered an indicator for sexual arousal disorder, vaginal dryness may also result from insufficient excitement and stimulation or from hormonal changes caused by menopause (potentially causing atrophic vaginitis), pregnancy, or breast-feeding. Irritation from contraceptive creams and foams can also cause dryness, as can fear and anxiety about sexual intimacy. Vaginal dryness can also be a symptom of Sjögren's disease (SjD), a chronic autoimmune disorder in which the body destroys moisture-producing glands.

Certain medications, including some over-the-counter antihistamines, as well as life events such as pregnancy, lactation, menopause, aging or diseases such as diabetes, will inhibit lubrication. Medicines with anticholinergic or sympathomimetic effects will dry out the mucosal or "wet" tissues of the vagina. Such medicines include many common drugs for allergenic, cardiovascular, psychiatric, and other medical conditions. Oral contraceptives may also increase or decrease vaginal lubrication.

In seemingly rare cases, selective serotonin reuptake inhibitors (SSRIs) have been reported to cause a long-lasting iatrogenic disorder known as post-SSRI sexual dysfunction, the symptoms of which include reduced vaginal lubrication in females.

Vaginal dryness affects 3-43% of women, and it is more common after menopause. Post-menopausal women produce less vaginal lubrication and reduced estrogen levels may be associated with increased vaginal dryness.

== Management strategies ==
=== Hormonal ===
Estrogen treatments are considered the gold standard for managing vaginal dryness. They are available in systemic and vaginal forms, with systemic estrogen addressing multiple issues such as vasomotor symptoms and osteoporosis, albeit with a higher risk profile. Vaginal estrogen, which includes creams, pills, rings, and inserts, is more commonly prescribed due to its lower risk. DHEA (prasterone) is a promising alternative that enhances vaginal health with minimal side effects and does not significantly alter hormone levels. Testosterone therapy is also an option, though it is off-label and lacks FDA-approved formulations, with limited data on its efficacy and safety.

=== Non-hormonal ===
The treatment of vaginal dryness includes over-the-counter (OTC) options of vaginal lubricants and moisturizers, non-estrogenic prescription treatments, laser and ultrasound devices, as well as lifestyle changes. Non-hormonal vaginal lubricants and moisturizers, which have minimal side effects and are easy to obtain, are the primary recommendation, especially for those contraindicated for hormone treatments. They aim to mimic natural vaginal conditions and provide temporary relief during intercourse, while regular use of moisturizers helps maintain moisture. Prescription treatments include non-estrogenic options for women who can't use estrogen. Ospemifene is a notable FDA-approved medication for vaginal dryness and discomfort, although concerns about long-term safety remain. Vaginal laser therapy and ultrasound devices are emerging options, particularly for those who do not respond to traditional methods. While initial results appear promising, evidence for their long-term efficacy is still limited. Lifestyle modifications can also alleviate vaginal dryness; quitting smoking, reducing alcohol intake, and maintaining a healthy weight is beneficial. Additionally, regular sexual activity can enhance tissue health and moisture levels, further aiding in symptom relief.

== Dry sex ==
Some people practice dry sex, which involves the removal of vaginal lubrication in some way. The rationale for the practice seems to be for cleansing purposes and to enhance the sexual pleasure of the penetrating partner. However, besides making sexual intercourse painful for the female, the practice is believed to increase the risk of transmitting sexually transmitted infections for both partners, such as HIV, with which the risk of transmission is increased by lacerations in the vaginal tissue resulting from the lack of lubrication.

== See also ==
- Female ejaculation
- G-spot
- Pre-ejaculate
- Skene's gland
- Spinnbarkeit, the stretchiness of cervical mucus associated with ovulation; one property of this secretion is to lubricate the vagina
- Urethral sponge
- Vabbing
- Vaginal discharge
