= Perineal sponge =

Erectile tissue in women

The perineal sponge is a spongy cushion of tissue and blood vessels found in the lower genital area of women. It sits between the vaginal opening and rectum and is internal to the perineum and perineal body.

== Functions ==
The perineal sponge is composed of erectile tissue; during arousal, it becomes swollen with blood compressing the outer third of the vagina along with the vestibular bulbs and urethral sponge thereby tightening the vagina and increasing stimulation for the vagina and a penis, if involved.

== Sexual stimulation ==
The perineal sponge is erogenous tissue encompassing a large number of nerve endings, and can, therefore, be stimulated through the back wall of the vagina or the top wall of the rectum.
