= VAB =

VAB may refer to:

- Vabbing
- Vacuum-assisted breast biopsy, a minimally invasive procedure
- Vehicle Assembly Building, a large building at NASA's Kennedy Space Center where space vehicles are prepared for launch
- Véhicule de l'Avant Blindé, a French wheeled armored personnel carrier
- Visual Arts Board, historic board of the Australia Council

== See also ==
- Vabs (disambiguation)
