= Vabs =

Vabs or VABS may refer to:

- Vafs, Markazi, a village in Markazi Province, Iran
- Waabs, a municipality in Schleswig-Holstein, Germany
- Vineland Adaptive Behaviour Scales, a measure of effectiveness in the Treatment and Education of Autistic and Related Communication Handicapped Children

== See also ==
- VAB (disambiguation)
