= Erectile tissue =

Tissue that may become engorged with blood

Erectile tissue is tissue in the body with numerous vascular spaces, or cavernous tissue, that may become engorged with blood. However, tissue that is devoid of or otherwise lacking erectile tissue (such as the labia minora, vestibule, vagina and urethra) may also be described as engorging with blood, often with regard to sexual arousal.

== In sex organs ==
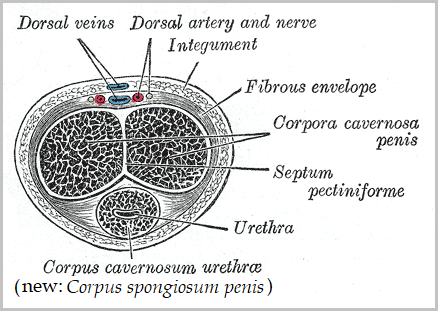
Cross section showing the two corpora cavernosa near the top surface of the penis, and the corpus spongiosum surrounding the urethra near the bottom surface

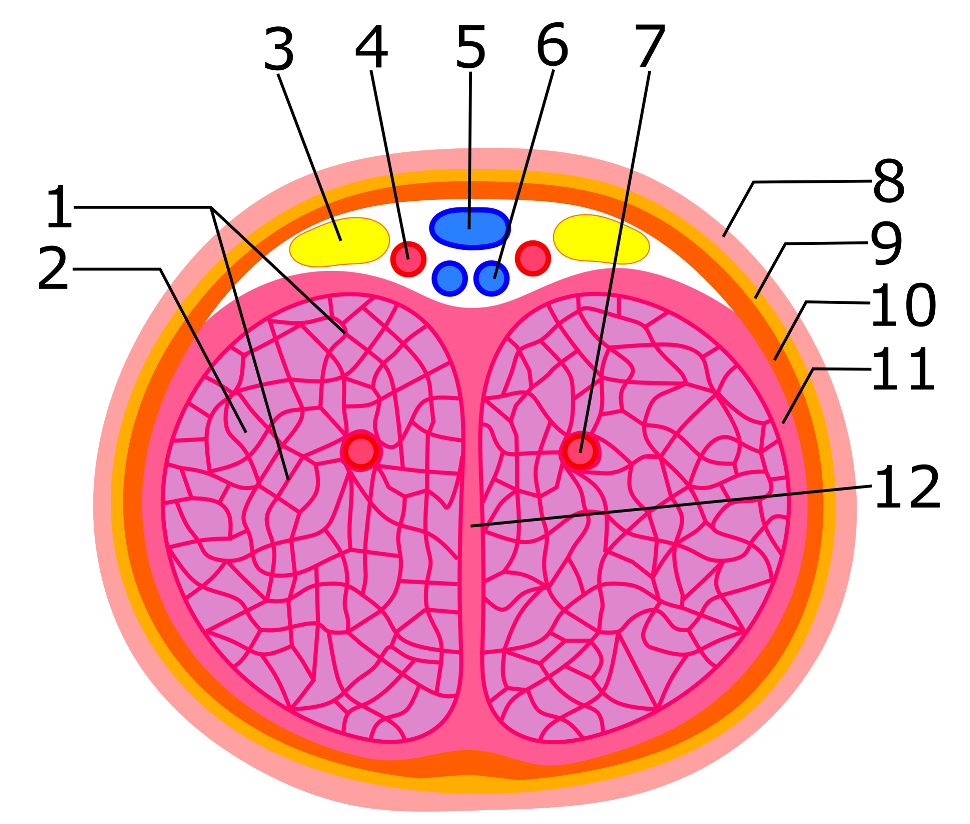
Cross section showing the two corpora cavernosa of the clitoris

Erectile tissue exists in external genitals such as the corpora cavernosa of the penis and their homologs in the clitoris, also called the corpora cavernosa. During penile or clitoral erection, the corpora cavernosa will become engorged with arterial blood, a process called tumescence. This may result from any of various physiological stimuli which can be internal or external. This process of stimulation, due to internal or external stimuli, is also known as sexual arousal. The corpus spongiosum is a single tubular structure located just below the corpora cavernosa in males. This may also become slightly engorged with blood, but less so than the corpora cavernosa.

== In the nose ==
Erectile tissue is present in the anterior part of the nasal septum and is attached to the turbinates of the nose. The nasal cycle occurs as the erectile tissue on one side of the nose congests and the other side decongests. This process is controlled by the autonomic nervous system with parasympathetic dominance being associated with congestion and sympathetic with decongestion. The time of one cycle may vary greatly between individuals, with Kahana-Zweig et al. finding a range between 15 minutes and 10.35 hours though the average was noted as 2.15 ± 1.84 hours.

== Other types ==
Erectile tissue is also found in the urethral sponge and perineal sponge. The erection of nipples is not due to erectile tissue, but rather due to the contraction of smooth muscle under the control of the autonomic nervous system.
