= Vabbing =

Vaginal perfume trend

Vabbing is the application of vaginal secretions as a perfume. It was first popularized on TikTok in 2022 as a way of attracting men.

== Use and popularization ==
Vabbing is done by placing vaginal secretions on pulse points behind the ears and wrists, with the intention of attracting men. It was popularised on social media platform TikTok in 2022.

== Efficacy ==
There is no research that indicates this technique works, with the placebo effect offered by a relevant expert as the only possibility for any efficacy.

== See also ==
- Human sex pheromones, a scientific theory of human sexual attraction
- Human sexual activity, the manner in which humans engage sexually
