= Cavernous tissue =

Blood-filled spaces in the body

Cavernous tissue refers to blood-filled spaces lined by endothelium and surrounded by smooth muscle. It is present in the erectile tissue of the penis and clitoris.
