= Urethral sponge =

Tissue in female human lower genital area

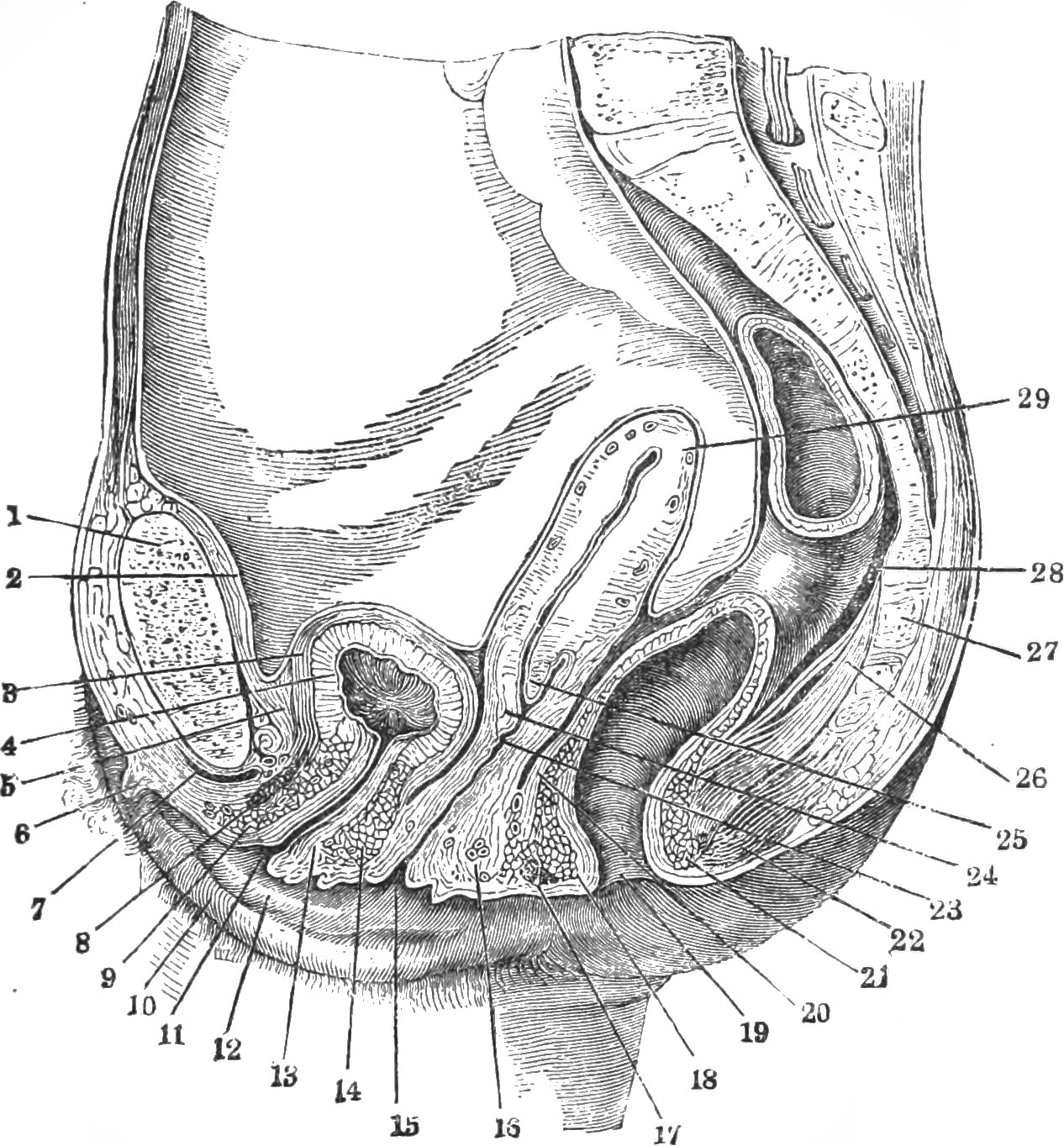
9 and 14. The urethral sponge

The urethral sponge is a spongy cushion of tissue, found in the lower genital area of females, that sits against both the pubic bone and vaginal wall, and surrounds the urethra.

== Functions ==
The urethral sponge is composed of erectile tissue; during arousal, it becomes swollen with blood, compressing the urethra, helping, along with the pubococcygeus muscle, to prevent urination during sexual activity.

=== Female ejaculation ===
Additionally, the urethral sponge contains the Skene's glands, which may be involved in female ejaculation.

=== Sexual stimulation ===
The urethral sponge encompasses sensitive nerve endings, and can be stimulated through the front wall of the vagina. Some women experience intense pleasure from stimulation of the urethral sponge and others find the sensation irritating. The urethral sponge surrounds the clitoral nerve, and since the two are so closely interconnected, stimulation of the clitoris may stimulate the nerve endings of the urethral sponge and vice versa. Some women enjoy the rear-entry position of sexual intercourse for this reason, because the penis is often angled slightly downward and can stimulate the front wall of the vagina, and in turn the urethral sponge.

=== Relation with the G-spot ===
The urethral sponge is an area in which the G-spot (Gräfenberg Spot) may be found. Although the G-spot may exist, it has been doubted by various researchers. A team at The King's College in London, the biggest study on the G-spot's existence thus far, and involving 1,800 women, found no proof that the G-spot exists. The authors of the study concluded that the "G-spot" may be a figment of people's imagination, which has been encouraged by magazines, sex therapists and suggestive therapeutics. Other studies, using ultrasound, have found physiological evidence of the G-spot in women who report having orgasms during intercourse.

== See also ==
- Prostate
