= IEC 60228 =

Standard for conductors of insulated cables

IEC 60228 is the International Electrotechnical Commission (IEC)'s international standard on conductors of insulated cables. As of 2023 the current version is Third Edition 2004-11 Among other things, it defines a set of standard wire cross-sectional areas:

- 0.5 mm^{2}
- 0.75 mm^{2}
- 1 mm^{2}
- 1.5 mm^{2}
- 2.5 mm^{2}
- 4 mm^{2}
- 6 mm^{2}
- 10 mm^{2}
- 16 mm^{2}
- 25 mm^{2}
- 35 mm^{2}
- 50 mm^{2}
- 70 mm^{2}
- 95 mm^{2}
- 120 mm^{2}
- 150 mm^{2}
- 185 mm^{2}
- 240 mm^{2}
- 300 mm^{2}
- 400 mm^{2}
- 500 mm^{2}
- 630 mm^{2}
- 800 mm^{2}
- 1000 mm^{2}
- 1200 mm^{2}
- 1400 mm^{2} (Note: Non-preferred size)
- 1600 mm^{2}
- 1800 mm^{2}
- 2000 mm^{2}
- 2500 mm^{2}

Comparison of SWG (red), AWG (blue) and IEC 60228 (black) wire gauge sizes from 0.03 to 200 mm² to scale on a 1 mm grid – in the SVG file, hover over a size to highlight it

In engineering applications, it is often most convenient to describe a wire in terms of its cross-section area, rather than its diameter, because the cross section is directly proportional to its strength and weight, and inversely proportional to its resistance. The cross-sectional area is also related to the maximum current that a metallic wire can carry safely.

This document is one considered fundamental in that it does not contain reference to any other standard.

== Description ==
The document describes several aspects of the conductors for electrical cables

=== Class ===
This refers to the flexibility and thermal effects i.e temperature of a conductor.

- Class 1: Solid conductor
- Class 2: Stranded conductor intended for fixed installation
- Class 5: Flexible conductor
- Class 6: Very Flexible conductor

=== Size ===
The nominal (see below) cross-sectional area for standard conductors including the following:

- Class 2: Minimum number of strands required to make particular conductor size
- Class 5 and 6: Maximum diameter of any component strand of the conductor

=== Resistance ===
The maximum permissible resistance per unit length (in ohms per kilometre – Ω/km) of each conductor size, class and type (both plain copper and metal coated)

== Purpose of the document ==
This document and its precursors were created due to a need for a standard definition of cable conductor size. The main problem being that not all copper has the same resistivity value, so, for example, a 4 mm^{2} conductor from two different suppliers may have different resistance values. Instead this document describes conductors by their nominal size, determined by resistance rather than physical dimensions. This is a key distinction as it makes a standardized definition of conductors based solely on their electrical characteristics.

Almost all characteristics of conductors, resistance, current carrying capacity etc. are dependent on the physical dimensions of the conductor. However this document allows an easy reference whereby the standard conductor sizes and reference to physical dimensions are maintained but given an exact meaning in terms of the electrical characteristics of a conductor.

== See also ==
- American wire gauge (AWG) – Used primarily in the US and Canada
- Body jewelry sizes – Wikipedia overview article
- Circular mil – Unusual unit used as the North American Electrical industry standard for wires larger than 4/0
- Electrical wiring – Electrical installation of cabling
- Jewelry wire
- Number 8 wire – Term used in the New Zealand vernacular
- Standard wire gauge (SWG) – British imperial standard BS 3737, superseded by the metric
- Stubs Iron Wire Gauge – Wire gauge system used in medicine
