= Wire gauge =

Measurement of wire diameter

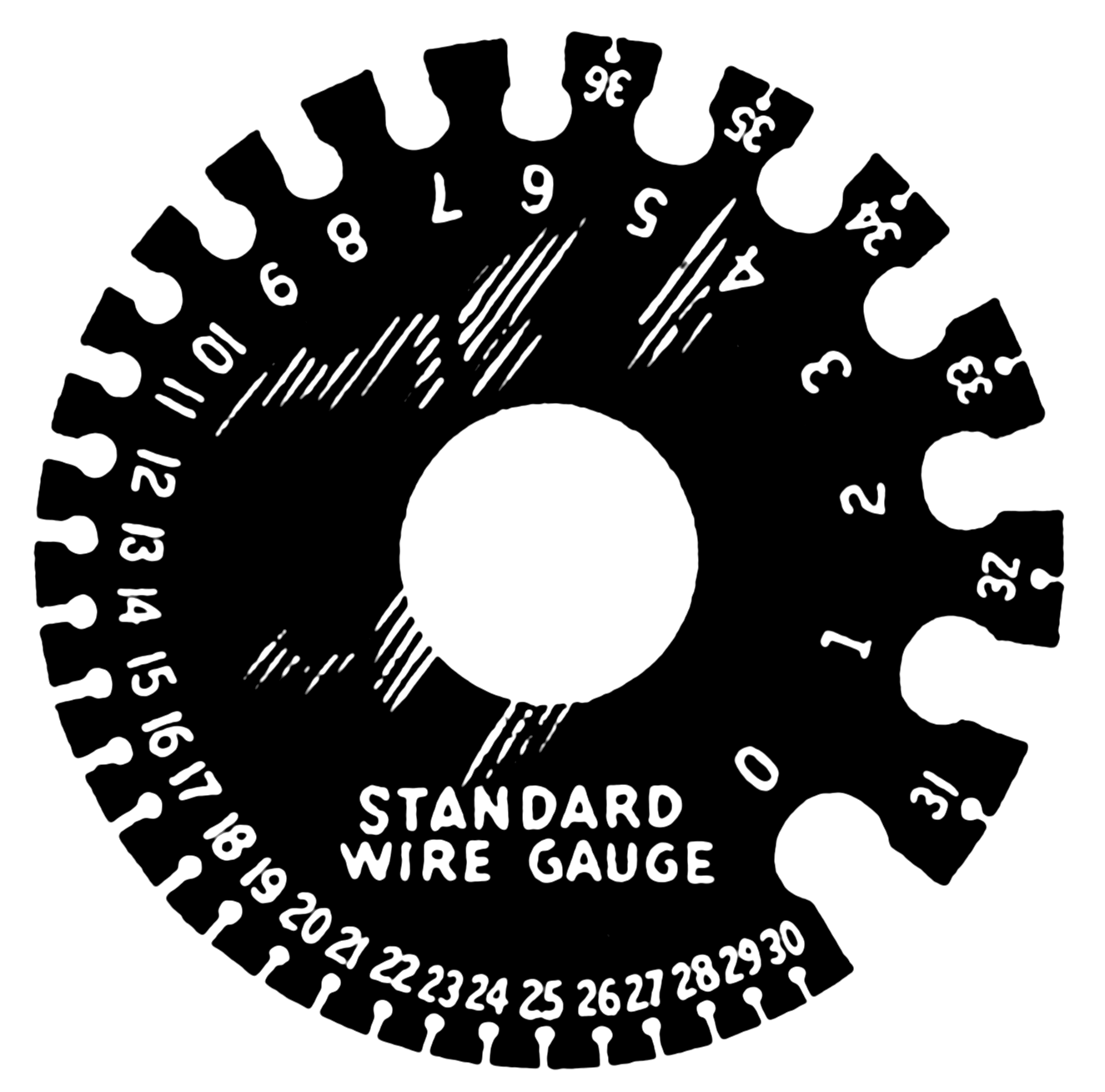
A device for measuring American wire gauge.

Wire gauge is a measurement of wire diameter. This determines the amount of electric current the wire can safely carry, as well as its electrical resistance and weight.

== Types of wire gauge ==
Wire gauges may be broadly divided into two groups, the empirical and the geometric. The first includes all the older gauge measurements, notably the Birmingham gauge (B.W.G. or Stubs) and the Lancashire. The origin of the B.W.G. is obscure. The numbers of wire were in common use earlier than 1735 when the measurements were officially defined. It is believed that they originally were based on the series of drawn wires, No. 1 being the original rod, and succeeding numbers corresponding with each draw, so that No. 10, for example, would have passed ten times through the draw plate. But the Birmingham and the Lancashire gauges, the latter being based on an averaging of the dimensions collated from a large number of the former in the possession of Peter Stubs of Warrington (1756–1806), have long held the leading position, and are still retained and used probably to a greater extent than the more recent geometrical gauges.

Comparison of SWG (red), AWG (blue) and IEC 60228 (black) wire gauge sizes from 0.03 to 200 mm² to scale on a 1 mm grid – in the SVG file, hover over a size to highlight it

The first attempt to adopt a geometrical system was made by Brown & Sharpe in 1855. They established a regular progression of thirty-nine steps between the English sizes, No. 0000 (460 thou or about 12 mm) and No. 36 (5 mils or about 0.13 mm). Each diameter was multiplied by 0.890526 to give the next lower size. This is now the American wire gauge (AWG), and is prevalent in North America and used to some extent in over 65 countries, with a market share of about 30% of all power and control wires and cables.

The Imperial Standard Wire Gauge, which was sanctioned by the British Board of Trade in 1884, was formulated by J. Latimer Clark. Following one of its recommendations, it differs from pre-existing gauges scarcely more than they differ among themselves, and is based on a rational system, the basis being the circular mil. No. 7/0, the largest size, is 0.50 inches (500 mils or 12.7 mm) in diameter (250 000 circular mils in cross-sectional area), and the smallest, No. 50, is 0.001 inches (1 mil or 25.4 μm) in diameter (1 circular mil [cross-sectional area] or 0.7854 millionths of a square inch). Between each step the diameter, or thickness, diminishes by 10.557%, and the area and weight diminish by ~ 20%.

None of the above systems of measurement is part of the metric system.

The current British Standard for metallic materials including wire is BS 6722:1986, which is a solely metric standard, superseding 3737:1964, which used the SWG system.

The IEC 60228, used in most parts of the world, defines standard wire sizes based on their cross-sectional areas as expressed in mm^{2}. Each wire size has to respect a maximum resistivity value.

== Measuring ==
In commerce, the sizes of wire are estimated by devices, also called gauges, which consist of plates of circular or oblong form having notches of different widths around their edges to receive wire and sheet metals of different thicknesses. Each notch is stamped with a number, and the wire or sheet, which just fits a given notch, is stated to be of, say, No. 10, 11, 12, etc., of the wire gauge.

The circular forms of wire gauge measurement devices are the most popular, and are generally 3 3/4 inches (95 mm) in diameter, with thirty-six notches; many have the decimal equivalents of the sizes stamped on the back. Oblong plates are similarly notched. Rolling mill gauges are also oblong in form. Many gauges are made with a wedge-like slot into which the wire is thrust; one edge being graduated, the point at which the movement of the wire is arrested gives its size. The graduations are those of standard wire, or in thousandths of an inch. In some cases both edges are graduated differently in order to allow comparison between two systems of measurement. A few gauges are made with holes into which the wire has to be thrust. All gauges are hardened and ground to dimensions.

In some applications wire sizes are specified as the cross sectional area of the wire, usually in mm^{2}. Advantages of this system include the ability to readily calculate the physical dimensions or weight of wire, ability to take account of non-circular wire, and ease of calculation of electrical properties.

== See also ==
- IEC 60228, the metric wire-size standard used in most parts of the world.
- Circular mil, Electrical industry standard for wires larger than 4/0.
- American Wire Gauge (AWG), used primarily in the US and Canada.
- Standard Wire Gauge (SWG), the British imperial standard BS3737.
- Jewelry wire gauge
- Body jewelry sizes
