= Circular mil =

Unit of area

circular mil

General information
- Unit of: Area
- Symbol: cmil
- Derivation: 1 cmil = π/4(0.001 in)^{2}

Conversions
1 cmil in ...	... is equal to ...
- SI units: 506.7075 μm^{2}
- FPS units: 7.853982×10^{−7} in^{2}

A circular mil is a unit of area, equal to the area of a circle with a diameter of one mil (one thousandth of an inch or 0.0254 mm). It is equal to π/4 square mils or approximately 5.067×10^{−4} mm^{2}. It is a unit intended for referring to the area of a wire with a circular cross section. As the definition of the unit contains π, it is easy to calculate area values in circular mils when the diameter in mils is known.

The area in circular mils, A, of a circle with a diameter of d mils, is given by the formula:
$$A_{\mathrm{cmil}} = (d_{\mathrm{mil}})^2$$

In Canada and the United States, the Canadian Electrical Code (CEC) and the National Electrical Code (NEC), respectively, use the circular mil to define wire sizes larger than 0000 AWG. In many NEC publications and uses, large wires may be expressed in thousands of circular mils, which is abbreviated in two different ways: kcmil or MCM. For example, one common wire size used in the NEC has a conductor diameter of 0.5 inches, or 500 mils, and thus a cross-section of $500^2 = 250{,}000$ circular mils, written as 250 kcmil or 250 MCM, which is the first size larger than 0000 AWG used within the NEC.

1,000 circular mil equals approximately 0.5067 mm^{2}, so for many purposes, a ratio of 2 MCM ≈ 1 mm^{2} can be used with negligible (1.3%) error.

== Equivalence to other units of area ==
As a unit of area, the circular mil can be converted to other units such as square inches or square millimetres.

1 circular mil is approximately equal to:

- 0.7854 square mils (1 square mil is about 1.273 circular mils)
- 7.854 × 10^{−7} square inches (1 square inch is about 1.273 million circular mils)
- 5.067 × 10^{−10} square metres
- 5.067 × 10^{−4} square millimetres
- 506.7 μm^{2}

1000 circular mils = 1 MCM or 1 kcmil, and is (approximately) equal to:

- 0.5067 mm^{2}, so 2 kcmil ≈ 1 mm^{2} (a 1.3% error)

Therefore, for practical purposes such as wire choice, 2 kcmil ≈ 1 mm^{2} is a reasonable rule of thumb for many applications.

=== Square mils ===
In square mils, the area of a circle with a diameter of 1 mil is:

$$A
= \pi r^2
= \pi \left( \frac{d}{2} \right) ^2
= \frac{\pi d^2}{4}
= \rm \frac{\pi \times (1~mil)^2}{4}
= \frac{\pi}{4}~mil^2 \approx 0.7854~mil^2$$

By definition, this area is also equal to 1 circular mil, so

$$\rm 1~cmil = \frac{\pi}{4}~mil^2$$

The conversion factor from square mils to circular mils is therefore 4/π cmil per square mil:

$$\rm 1~mil^2 = \frac{4}{\pi}~cmil$$

The formula for the area of an arbitrary circle in circular mils can be derived by applying this conversion factor to the standard formula for the area of a circle (which gives its result in square mils).

$$\begin{align}
A_{\textrm{mil}^2} &= \pi r^2 = \pi \left( \frac{d}{2} \right) ^2 = \frac{\pi d^2}{4} && (\text{Area in square mils})\\[2ex]
A_\textrm{cmil} &= A_{\textrm{mil}^2} \times \frac{4}{\pi} && (\text{Convert to cmil})\\[2ex]
A_\textrm{cmil} &= \frac{\pi d^2}{4} \times \frac{4}{\pi} && (\text{Substitute area in square mils with its definition})\\[2ex]
A_\textrm{cmil} &= d^2 && (\text{where d is measured in mils})\\[2ex]
\end{align}$$

=== Square inches ===
To equate circular mils with square inches rather than square mils, the definition of a mil in inches can be substituted:

$$\begin{align}
\rm 1~cmil &= \rm \frac{\pi}{4}~mil^2 = \frac{\pi}{4}~(0.001~in)^2\\[2ex]
&= \rm \frac{\pi}{4{,}000{,}000}~in^2 \approx 7.854 \times 10^{-7}~in^2
\end{align}$$

=== Square millimetres ===
Likewise, since 1 inch is defined as exactly 25.4 mm, 1 mil is equal to exactly 0.0254 mm, so a similar conversion is possible from circular mils to square millimetres:

$$\begin{align}
\rm 1~cmil &= \rm \frac{\pi}{4}~mil^2 = \frac{\pi}{4}~(0.0254~mm)^2 = \frac{\pi \times 0.000\,645\,16}{4}~mm^2 \\[2ex]
&= \rm 1.6129\pi \times 10^{-4}~mm^2 \approx 5.067 \times 10^{-4}~mm^2
\end{align}$$

== Example calculations ==
A 0000 AWG solid wire is defined to have a diameter of exactly 0.46 inches (11.68 mm). The cross-sectional area of this wire is:

=== Formula 1: circular mil ===
Note: 1 inch = 1000 mils

$$\begin{align}
d &= \rm 0.46~inches = 460~mil \\
A &= d^2 ~ \rm cmil/mil^2 = (460~mil)^2 ~ cmil/mil^2 = 211{,}600~cmil.
\end{align}$$

(This is the same result as the AWG circular mil formula shown below for n = −3)

=== Formula 2: square mil ===
$$\begin{align}
d &= \rm 0.46~inches = 460~mils \\
r &= {d \over 2} = \rm 230~mils \\
A &= \pi r^2 = \rm \pi \times (230~mil)^2  = 52{,}900 \pi~mil^2 \approx 166{,}190.25~mil^2
\end{align}$$

=== Formula 3: square inch ===
$$\begin{align}
d &= \rm 0.46~inches \\
r &= {d \over 2} = \rm 0.23~inches \\
A &= \pi r^2 = \rm \pi \times (0.23~in)^2  = 0.0529 \pi \approx 0.16619~in^2
\end{align}$$

=== Calculating diameter from area ===
When large diameter wire sizes are specified in kcmil, such as the widely used 250 kcmil and 350 kcmil wires, the diameter of the wire can be calculated from the area without using π:

We first convert from kcmil to circular mil

$$\begin{align}
A &= \rm 250~kcmil = 250{,}000~\text{cmil} \\
d &= \sqrt{A ~ \mathrm{mil^2/cmil}} \\
d &= \rm \sqrt{(250{,}000~cmil) ~ mil^2/cmil} = 500~mil = 0.500~inches
\end{align}$$

Thus, this wire would have a diameter of a half inch or 12.7 mm.

== Metric equivalent ==
Some tables give conversions to circular millimetres (cmm). The area in cmm is defined as the square of the wire diameter in mm. However, this unit is rarely used in practice. One of the few examples is in a patent for a bariatric weight loss device.

$$\rm 1~cmm = \left( \frac{1000}{25.4} \right) ^2~cmil \approx 1{,}550~cmil$$

== AWG circular mil formula ==
The formula to calculate the area in circular mil for any given AWG (American Wire Gauge) size is as follows. $A_n$ represents the area of number $n$ AWG.

$$A_n = \left (5 \times 92^{(36 - n)/39}\right)^2$$

For example, a number 12 gauge wire would use $n = 12$:

$$\left(5 \times 92^{(36-12)/39}\right)^2 = 6530~\textrm{cmil}$$

Sizes with multiple zeros are successively larger than 0 AWG and can be denoted using "number of zeros/0"; for example "4/0" for 0000 AWG. For an $m$/0 AWG wire, use

$n = -(m - 1) = 1 - m$ in the above formula.

For example, 0000 AWG (4/0 AWG), would use $n = -3$; and the calculated result would be 211,600 circular mils.

== Standard large wire sizes in kcmil ==
In North America wires larger than the AWG are available in sizes beginning with a half-inch (500 mil) diameter. However, solid core wire of that size would be quite stiff for most uses as it resists bending and coiling for transport. Therefore, most large wires are made of tightly-bound strands of smaller wire with the same cross-sectional area of conductors. The table below has a diameter column that is for solid wire with no strands. Since standard sizes have a fixed area, a stranded wire would always have a larger diameter than the table shown below.

Large standard wires range from 250 to 400 kcmil in increments of 50 kcmil, from 400 to 1000 in increments of 100 kcmil, and from 1000 to 2000 in increments of 250 kcmil.

The diameter in the table below is that of a solid rod with the given conductor area in circular mils. Stranded wire is larger in diameter to allow for gaps between the strands, depending on the number and size of strands.

Standard kcmil wire sizes & solid copper equivalents
Area		Diameter		NEC copper wire ampacity with 60/75/90 °C insulation (A)		
(kcmil, MCM)	(mm^{2})	(in)	(mm)	NEC copper wire ampacity with 60/75/90 °C insulation (A)		
250	126.7	0.500	12.70	215	255	290
300	152.0	0.548	13.91	240	285	320
350	177.3	0.592	15.03	260	310	350
400	202.7	0.632	16.06	280	335	380
500	253.4	0.707	17.96	320	380	430
600	304.0	0.775	19.67	355	420	475
700	354.7	0.837	21.25	385	460	520
750	380.0	0.866	22.00	400	475	535
800	405.4	0.894	22.72	410	490	555
900	456.0	0.949	24.10	435	520	585
1000	506.7	1.000	25.40	455	545	615
1250	633.4	1.118	28.40	495	590	665
1500	760.1	1.225	31.11	520	625	705
1750	886.7	1.323	33.60	545	650	735
2000	1013.4	1.414	35.92	560	665	750

Note: For smaller wires, consult American wire gauge § Tables of AWG wire sizes. Note: Aluminum wires have a much lower ampacity than copper but are often available in these sizes.

== Square mil ==
A square mil is a unit of area, equal to the area of a square with sides of length one mil. A mil is one thousandth of an international inch. This unit of area is usually used in specifying the area of the cross section of a wire or cable.

1 square mil is equal to:

- 1 millionth of a square inch (1 square inch is equal to 1 million square mils)
- 6.4516×10^{−10} square metres
- about 1.273 circular mils (1 circular mil is equal to about 0.7854 square mils). 1.273 ≈ 4/π and 0.7854 ≈ π/4.

== See also ==
- Thou (length)
- Square mil
- IEC 60228, the metric wire-size standard used in most parts of the world.
- American Wire Gauge (AWG), used primarily in the US and Canada
- Standard Wire Gauge (SWG), the British imperial standard BS3737, superseded by the metric.
- Stubs Iron Wire Gauge
- Jewelry wire gauge
- Body jewelry sizes
- Electrical wiring
- Number 8 wire, a term used in the New Zealand vernacular
