= 2/0 =

2/0 may refer to:

- A wire gauge size
  - 2/0 in American wire gauge
  - 2/0 in British Standard wire gauge
- "Two Divided by Zero", a song by Pet Shop Boys from the album Please

== See also ==
- Division by zero
