= 18/4 =

18/4 can refer to:

- April 18, in MM/DD notation
- American wire gauge 18, 4 conductor wire, commonly used for thermostats in the United States
