= 18/3 =

18/3 can refer to:

- March 18, in MM/DD notation
- American wire gauge 18, 3 conductor wire, commonly used for thermostats in the United States
