= 18/5 =

20 can refer to:

- May 18, in MM/DD notation
- American wire gauge 18, 5 conductor wire, commonly used for thermostats in the United States
