= 18/2 =

18/2 can refer to:

- February 18, in MM/DD notation
- American wire gauge 18, 5 conductor wire, commonly used for thermostats in the United States
