= Circular measure =

Type of unit of measurement of area

A circular measure was used in comparing circular cross-sections, e.g., of wires, etc. A circular unit of the ares is the area of the circle whose diameter is one linear unit.

For example, 1 circular mil is equivalent to 0.7854 square mil in area, 1 circular millimeter = 1550 circular mils = 0.7854 square millimeter. Here $0.7854 = \pi / 4.$
