= Wire =

Strand of metal

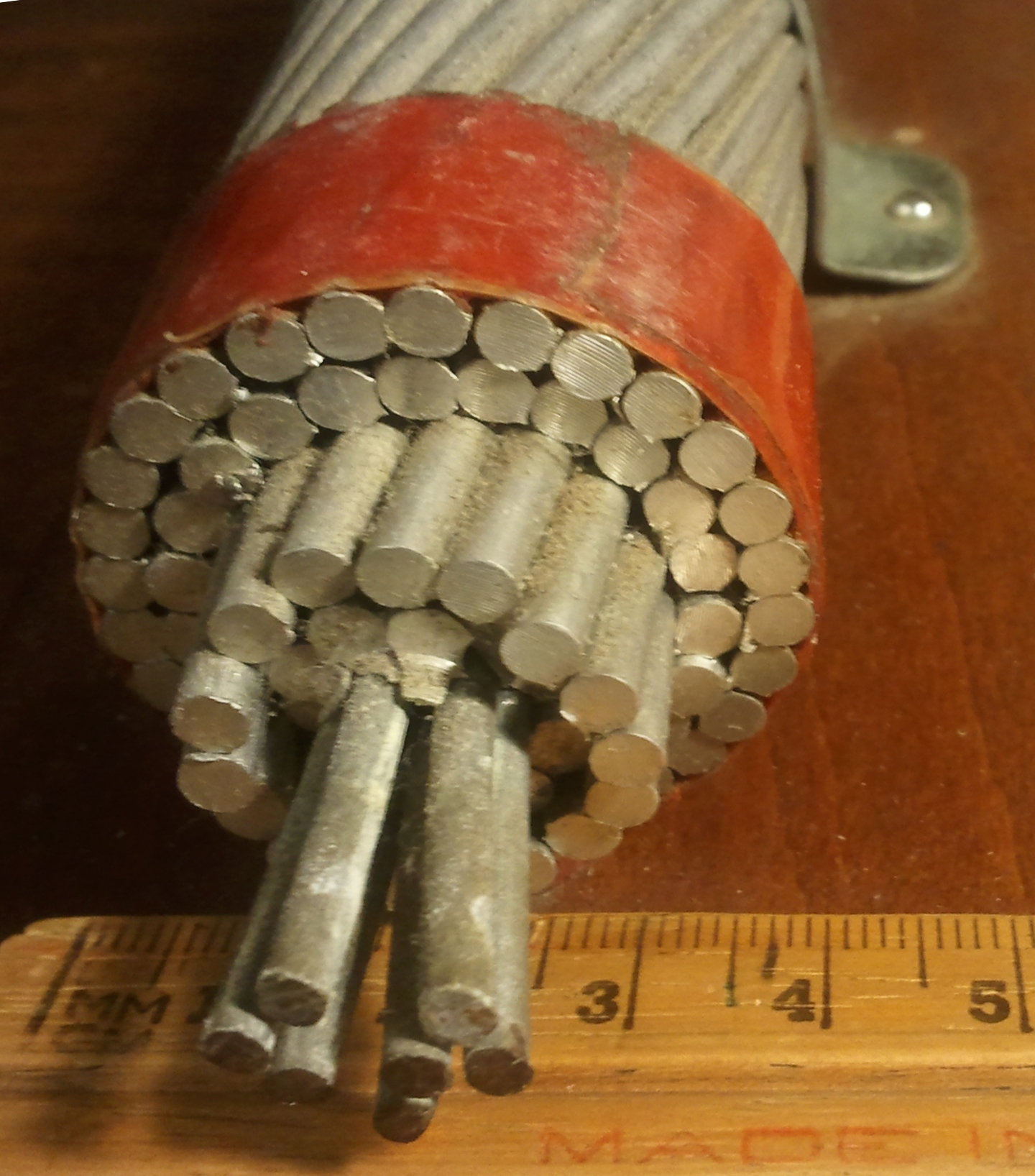
Overhead power cabling. The conductor consists of seven strands of steel (centre, high tensile strength), surrounded by four outer layers of aluminium (high conductivity). Sample diameter 40 mm

A wire is a flexible, round bar of metal. Wires are commonly formed by drawing the metal through a hole in a die or draw plate. Wire gauges come in various standard sizes, as expressed in terms of a gauge number or cross-sectional area.

Wires are used to bear mechanical loads, often in the form of wire rope. In electricity and telecommunications signals, wire can refer to electrical cable, which can contain a solid core of a single wire or separate strands in stranded or braided forms.

Usually cylindrical in geometry, wire can also be made in square, hexagonal, flattened rectangular, or other cross-sections, either for decorative purposes, or for technical purposes such as high-efficiency voice coils in loudspeakers. Edge-wound coil springs, such as the Slinky toy, are made of special flattened wire.

== History ==
Wire wrapped jewelry

In antiquity, jewelry often contained large amounts of wire in the form of chains and applied decoration that was accurately made and which must have been produced by some efficient, if not technically advanced, means. In some cases, strips cut from metal sheet were made into wire by pulling them through perforations in stone beads. This causes the strips to fold round on themselves to form thin tubes. This strip drawing technique was in use in Egypt by the 2nd Dynasty (c. 2890 – c. 2686 BCE). From the middle of the 2nd millennium BCE most of the gold wires in jewelry are characterized by seam lines that follow a spiral path along the wire. Such twisted strips can be converted into solid round wires by rolling them between flat surfaces or the strip wire drawing method. The strip twist wire manufacturing method was superseded by drawing in the ancient Old World sometime between about the 8th and 10th centuries AD. There is some evidence for the use of drawing further East before this period.

Square and hexagonal wires were possibly made using a swaging technique. In this method a metal rod was struck between grooved metal blocks, or between a grooved punch and a grooved metal anvil. Swaging is of great antiquity, possibly dating to the beginning of the 2nd millennium BCE in Egypt and in the Bronze and Iron Ages in Europe for torcs and fibulae. Twisted square-section wires are a very common filigree decoration in early Etruscan jewelry.

In about the middle of the 2nd millennium BCE, a new category of decorative tube was introduced which imitated a line of granules. True beaded wire, produced by mechanically distorting a round-section wire, appeared in the Eastern Mediterranean and Italy in the seventh century BCE, perhaps disseminated by the Phoenicians. Beaded wire continued to be used in jewellery into modern times, although it largely fell out of favour in about the tenth century CE when two drawn round wires, twisted together to form what are termed 'ropes', provided a simpler-to-make alternative. A forerunner to beaded wire may be the notched strips and wires which first occur from around 2000 BCE in Anatolia.

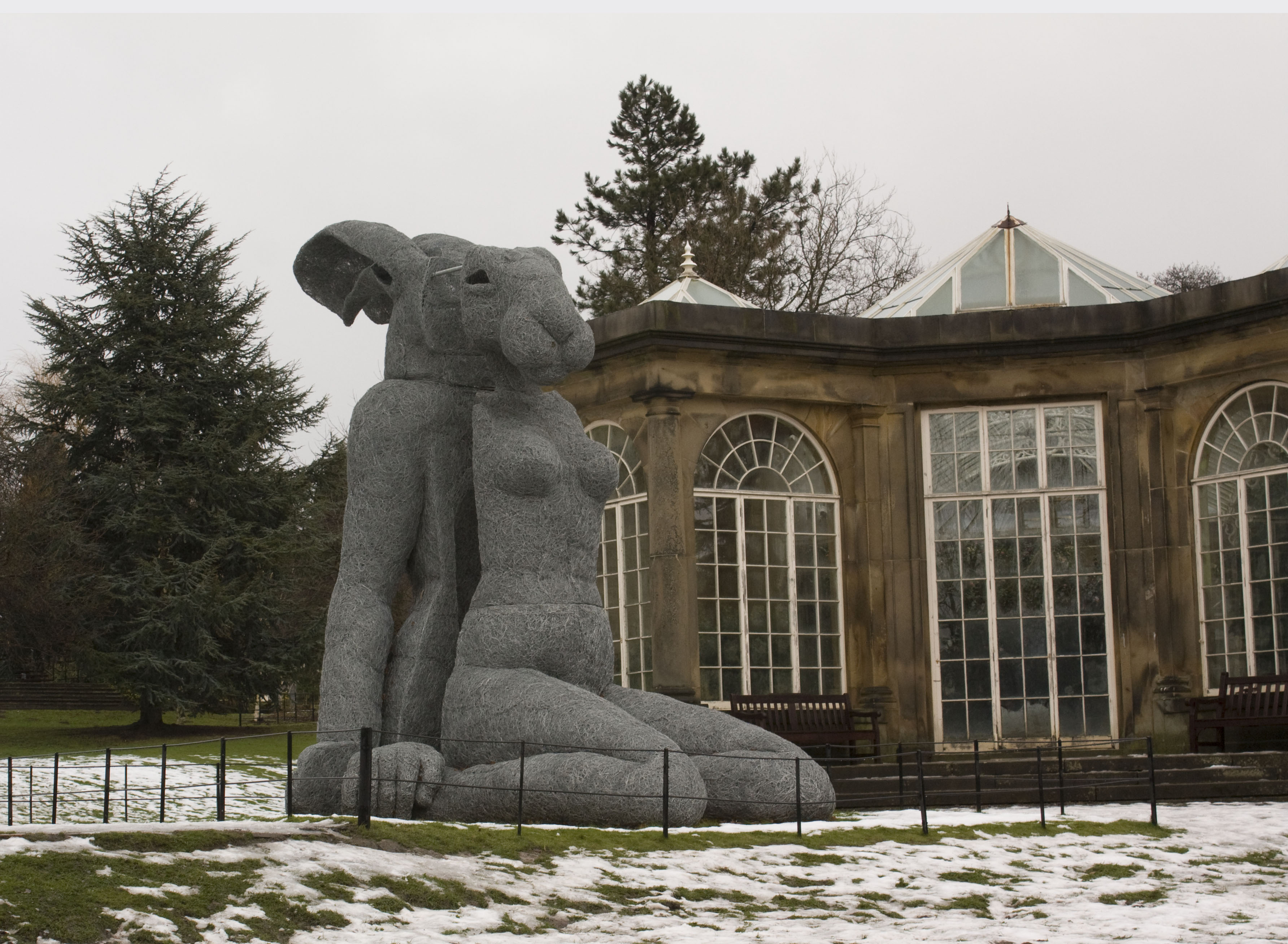
Sophie Ryder's galvanised wire sculpture Sitting at the Yorkshire Sculpture Park

Wire was drawn in England from the medieval period. The wire was used to make wool cards and pins, manufactured goods whose import was prohibited by Edward IV in 1463. The first wire mill in Great Britain was established at Tintern in about 1568 by the founders of the Company of Mineral and Battery Works, who had a monopoly on this. Apart from their second wire mill at nearby Whitebrook, there were no other wire mills before the second half of the 17th century. Despite the existence of mills, the drawing of wire down to fine sizes continued to be done manually.

According to a description in the early 20th century, "[w]ire is usually drawn of cylindrical form; but it may be made of any desired section by varying the outline of the holes in the draw-plate through which it is passed in the process of manufacture. The draw-plate or die is a piece of hard cast-iron or hard steel, or for fine work it may be a diamond or a ruby. The object of utilising precious stones is to enable the dies to be used for a considerable period without losing their size, and so producing wire of incorrect diameter. Diamond dies must be re-bored when they have lost their original diameter of hole, but metal dies are brought down to size again by hammering up the hole and then drifting it out to correct diameter with a punch."

== Production ==
Wire drawing concept

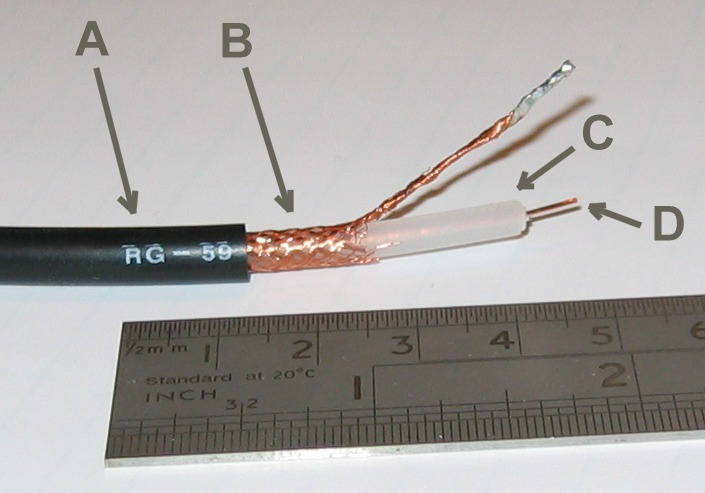
Coaxial cable, one example of a jacketed and insulated wire

Wire is often reduced to the desired diameter and properties by repeated drawing through progressively smaller dies, or traditionally holes in draw plates. After a number of passes the wire may be annealed to facilitate more drawing or, if it is a finished product, to maximise ductility and conductivity.

Electrical wires are usually covered with insulating materials, such as plastic, rubber-like polymers, or varnish. Insulating and jacketing of wires and cables is nowadays done by passing them through an extruder. Formerly, materials used for insulation included treated cloth or paper and various oil-based products. Since the mid-1960s, plastic and polymers exhibiting properties similar to rubber have predominated.

Two or more wires may be wrapped concentrically, separated by insulation, to form coaxial cable. The wire or cable may be further protected with substances like paraffin, some kind of preservative compound, bitumen, lead, aluminum sheathing, or steel taping. Stranding or covering machines wind material onto wire which passes through quickly. Some of the smallest machines for cotton covering have a large drum, which grips the wire and moves it through toothed gears; the wire passes through the centre of disks mounted above a long bed, and the disks carry each a number of bobbins varying from six to twelve or more in different machines. A supply of covering material is wound on each bobbin, and the end is led on to the wire, which occupies a central position relatively to the bobbins; the latter being revolved at a suitable speed bodily with their disks, the cotton is consequently served on to the wire, winding in spiral fashion so as to overlap. If many strands are required the disks are duplicated, so that as many as sixty spools may be carried, the second set of strands being laid over the first.

For heavier cables that are used for electric light and power as well as submarine cables, the machines are somewhat different in construction. The wire is still carried through a hollow shaft, but the bobbins or spools of covering material are set with their spindles at right angles to the axis of the wire, and they lie in a circular cage which rotates on rollers below. The various strands coming from the spools at various parts of the circumference of the cage all lead to a disk at the end of the hollow shaft. This disk has perforations through which each of the strands pass, thence being immediately wrapped on the cable, which slides through a bearing at this point. Toothed gears having certain definite ratios are used to cause the winding drum for the cable and the cage for the spools to rotate at suitable relative speeds which do not vary. The cages are multiplied for stranding with many tapes or strands, so that a machine may have six bobbins on one cage and twelve on the other.

== Forms ==
=== Solid ===
Solid wire, also called solid-core or single-strand wire, consists of one piece of metal wire. Solid wire is useful for wiring breadboards. Solid wire is cheaper to manufacture than stranded wire and is used where there is little need for flexibility in the wire. Solid wire also provides mechanical ruggedness; and, because it has relatively less surface area which is exposed to attack by corrosives, protection against the environment.

=== Stranded ===
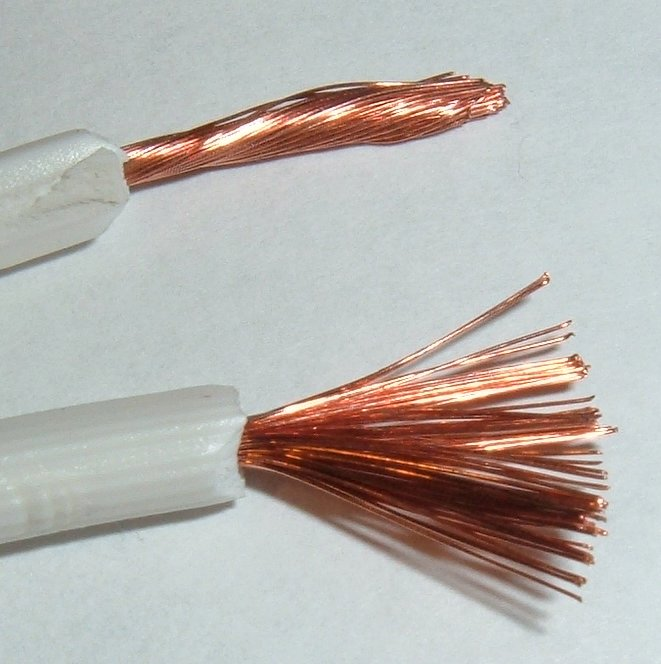
Stranded copper wire

Stranded wire is composed of a number of small wires bundled or wrapped together to form a larger conductor. Stranded wire is more flexible than solid wire of the same total cross-sectional area. Stranded wire is used when higher resistance to metal fatigue is required. Such situations include connections between circuit boards in multi-printed-circuit-board devices, where the rigidity of solid wire would produce too much stress as a result of movement during assembly or servicing; A.C. line cords for appliances; musical instrument cables; computer mouse cables; welding electrode cables; control cables connecting moving machine parts; mining machine cables; trailing machine cables; and numerous others. At high frequencies, current travels near the surface of the wire because of the skin effect, resulting in increased power loss in the wire. Stranded wire might seem to reduce this effect, since the total surface area of the strands is greater than the surface area of the equivalent solid wire, but ordinary stranded wire does not reduce the skin effect because all the strands are short-circuited together and behave as a single conductor. A stranded wire will have higher resistance than a solid wire of the same diameter because the cross-section of the stranded wire is not all copper; there are unavoidable gaps between the strands (this is the circle packing problem for circles within a circle). A stranded wire with the same cross-section of conductor as a solid wire is said to have the same equivalent gauge and is always a larger diameter. However, for many high-frequency applications, proximity effect is more severe than skin effect, and in some limited cases, simple stranded wire can reduce proximity effect. For better performance at high frequencies, litz wire, which has the individual strands insulated and twisted in special patterns, may be used.

The more individual wire strands in a wire bundle, the more flexible, kink-resistant, break-resistant, and stronger the wire becomes. However, more strands increases manufacturing complexity and cost. For geometrical reasons, the lowest number of strands usually seen is 7: one in the middle, with 6 surrounding it in close contact. The next level up is 19, which is another layer of 12 strands on top of the 7. After that the number varies, but 37 and 49 are common, then in the 70 to 100 range (the number is no longer exact). Larger numbers than that are typically found only in very large cables. For applications where the wire moves, 19 is the lowest that should be used (7 should only be used in applications where the wire is placed and then does not move), and 49 is much better. For applications with constant repeated movement, such as assembly robots and headphone wires, 70 to 100 is mandatory. For applications that need even more flexibility, even more strands are used (welding cables are the usual example, but also any application that needs to move wire in tight areas). One example is a 2/0 wire made from 5,292 strands of No. 36 gauge wire. The strands are organized by first creating a bundle of 7 strands. Then 7 of these bundles are put together into super bundles. Finally 108 super bundles are used to make the final cable. Each group of wires is wound in a helix so that when the wire is flexed, the part of a bundle that is stretched moves around the helix to a part that is compressed to allow the wire to have less stress.

Prefused wire is stranded wire made up of strands that are heavily tinned, then fused together. Prefused wire has many of the properties of solid wire, except it is less likely to break.

=== Braided ===
A braided wire consists of a number of small strands of wire braided together. Braided wires do not break easily when flexed. Braided wires are often suitable as an electromagnetic shield in noise-reduction cables.

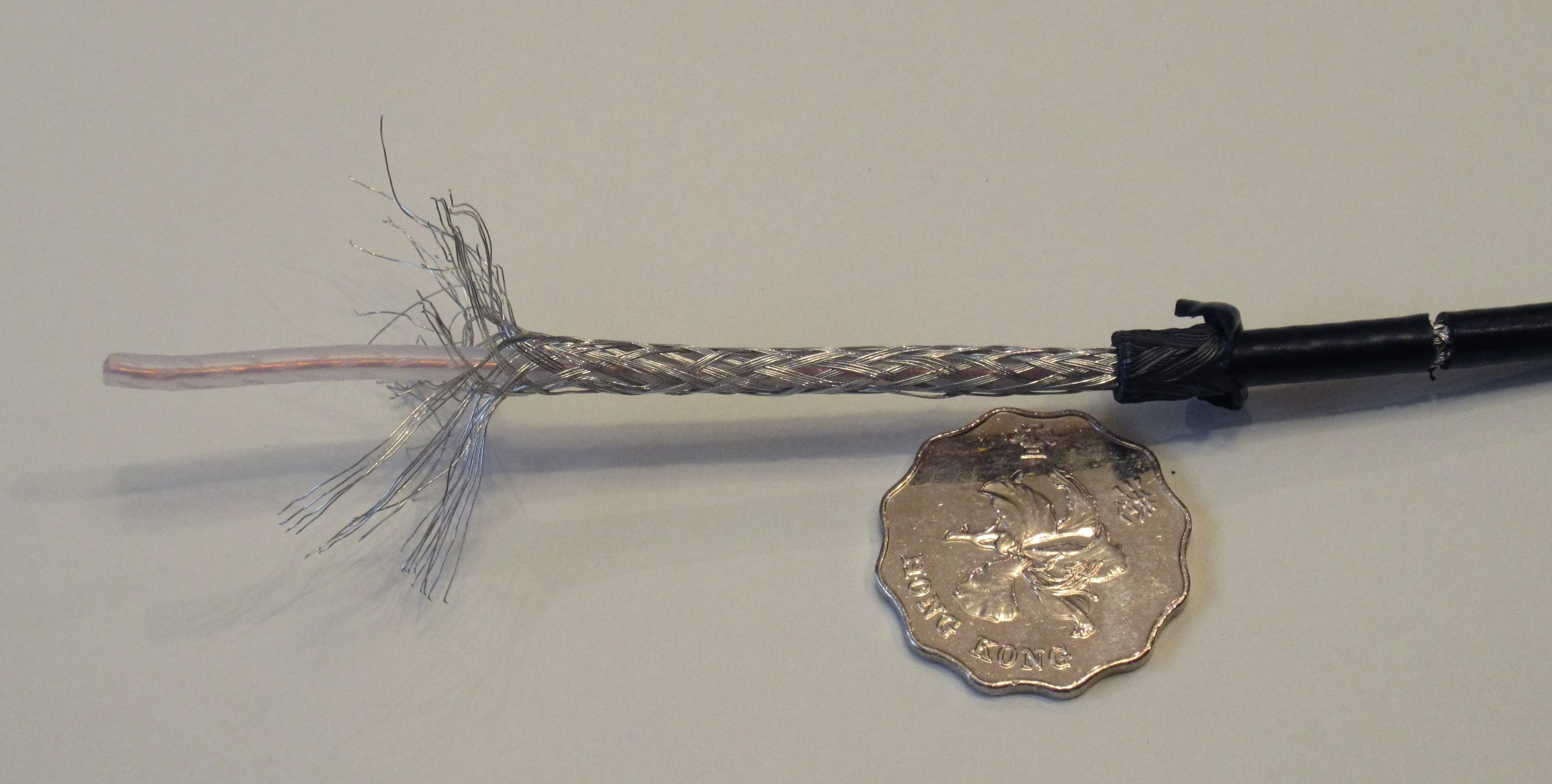
The outer conductor of this miniature coaxial cable (RG 58 type) is made of braided wire. Heavier braided cables are used for electrical connections that need a degree of flexibility, for example, connections to bus bars.

== Uses ==
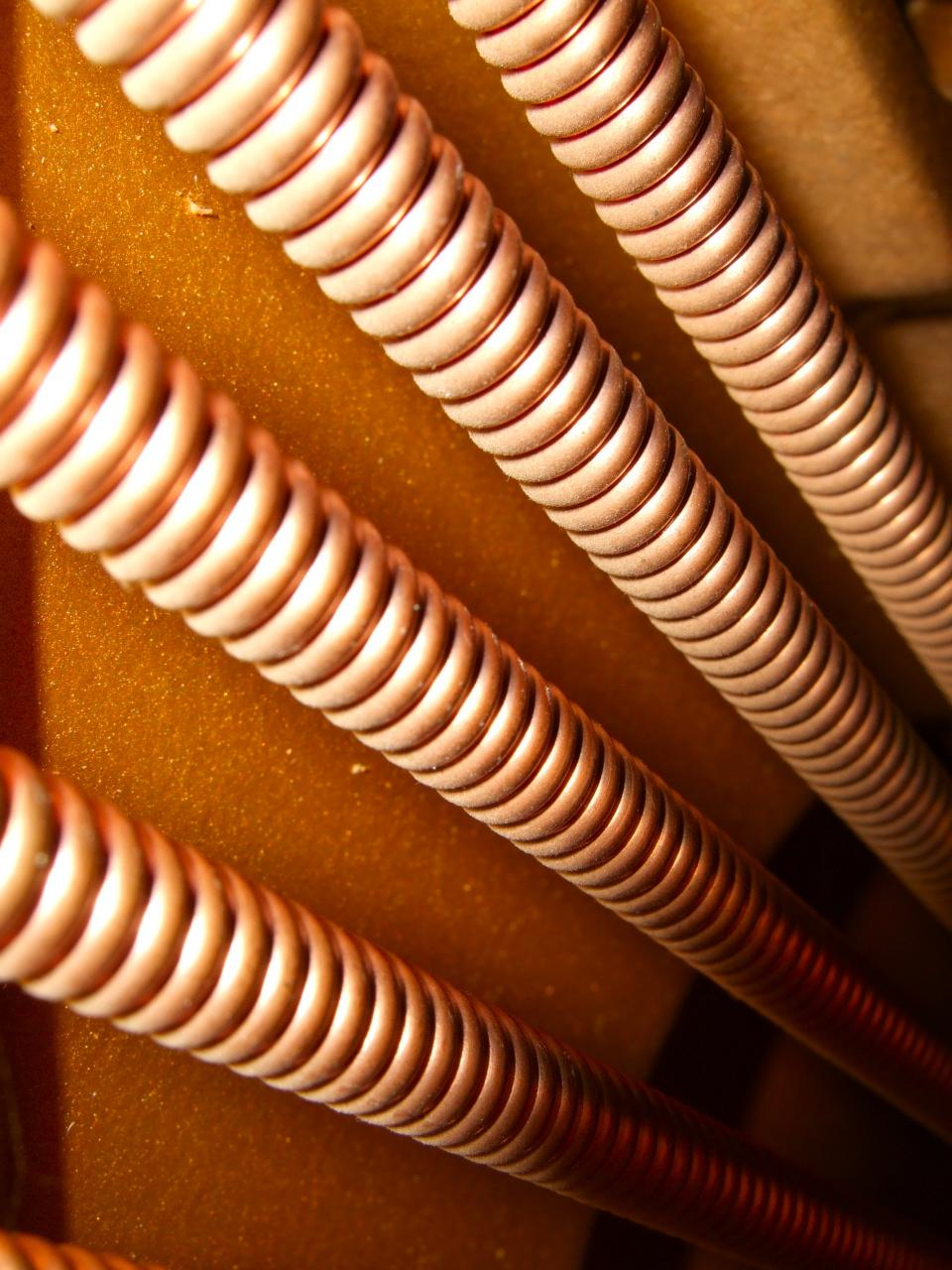
Close-up of strings of piano wire shows "overspun" helical wire wrapping added to main carrier wires.

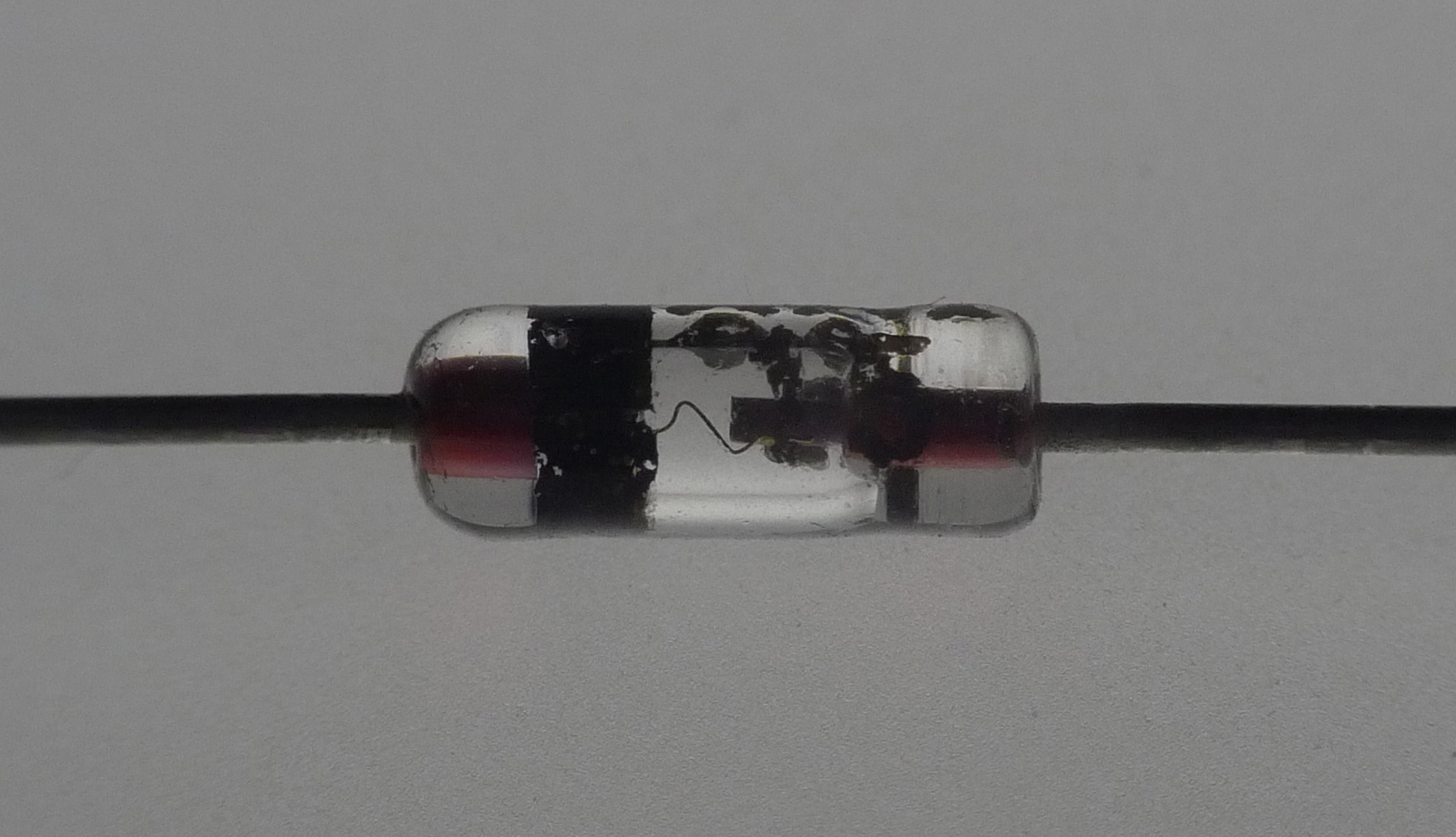
Germanium diode bonded with gold wire

Wire has many uses. It forms the raw material of many important manufacturers, such as the wire netting industry, engineered springs, wire-cloth making and wire rope spinning, in which it occupies a place analogous to a textile fiber. Wire-cloth of all degrees of strength and fineness of mesh is used for sifting and screening machinery, for draining paper pulp, for window screens, and for many other purposes. Vast quantities of aluminium, copper, nickel and steel wire are employed for telephone and data cables, and as conductors in electric power transmission, and heating. It is in no less demand for fencing, and much is consumed in the construction of suspension bridges, and cages, etc. In the manufacture of stringed musical instruments and scientific instruments, wire is again largely used. Carbon and stainless spring steel wire have significant applications in engineered springs for critical automotive or industrial manufactured parts/components. Pin and hairpin making; the needle and fish-hook industries; nail, peg, and rivet making; and carding machinery consume large amounts of wire as feedstock.

Not all metals and metallic alloys possess the physical properties necessary to make useful wire. The metals must in the first place be ductile and strong in tension, the quality on which the utility of wire principally depends. The principal metals suitable for wire, possessing almost equal ductility, are platinum, silver, iron, copper, aluminium, and gold; and it is only from these and certain of their alloys with other metals, principally brass and bronze, that wire is prepared.

By careful treatment, extremely thin wire can be produced. Special purpose wire is, however, made from other metals (e.g. tungsten wire for light bulb and vacuum tube filaments, because of its high melting temperature). Copper wires are also plated with other metals, such as tin, nickel, and silver to handle different temperatures, provide lubrication, and provide easier stripping of rubber insulation from copper.

Metallic wires are often used for the lower-pitched sound-producing "strings" in stringed instruments, such as violins, cellos, and guitars, and percussive string instruments such as pianos, dulcimers, dobros, and cimbaloms. To increase the mass per unit length (and thus lower the pitch of the sound even further), the main wire may sometimes be helically wrapped with another, finer strand of wire. Such musical strings are said to be "overspun"; the added wire may be circular in cross-section ("round-wound"), or flattened before winding ("flat-wound").

Examples include:

- Hook-up wire is small-to-medium gauge, solid or stranded, insulated wire, used for making internal connections inside electrical or electronic devices. It is often tin-plated to improve solderability.
- Wire bonding is the application of microscopic wires for making electrical connections inside semiconductor components and integrated circuits.
- Magnet wire is solid wire, usually copper, which, to allow closer winding when making electromagnetic coils, is insulated only with varnish, rather than the thicker plastic or other insulation commonly used on electrical wire. It is used for the winding of motors, transformers, inductors, generators, speaker coils, etc. (For further information about copper magnet wire, see: Copper wire and cable#Magnet wire (Winding wire).).
- Coaxial cable is a cable consisting of an inner conductor, surrounded by a tubular insulating layer typically made from a flexible material with a high dielectric constant, all of which is then surrounded by another conductive layer (typically of fine woven wire for flexibility, or of a thin metallic foil), and then finally covered again with a thin insulating layer on the outside. The term coaxial comes from the inner conductor and the outer shield sharing the same geometric axis. Coaxial cables are often used as a transmission line for radio frequency signals. In a hypothetical ideal coaxial cable, the electromagnetic field carrying the signal exists only in the space between the inner and outer conductors. Practical cables achieve this objective to a high degree. A coaxial cable provides extra protection of signals from external electromagnetic interference and effectively guides signals with low emission along the length of the cable which in turn affects thermal heat inside the conductivity of the wire.
- Speaker wire is used to make a low-resistance electrical connection between loudspeakers and audio amplifiers. Some high-end modern speaker wire consists of multiple electrical conductors individually insulated by plastic, similar to Litz wire.
- Resistance wire is wire with higher than normal resistivity, often used for heating elements or for making wire-wound resistors. Nichrome wire is the most common type.

== See also ==
- High-voltage cable
- Barbed wire
- Chicken wire
- Razor wire
- Tinsel wire
- Wollaston wire
