= Yankee ingenuity =

Notion of American innovation

Yankee ingenuity is an American English idiom in reference to the inventiveness, rugged expertise, self-reliance and individual enterprise associated with the Yankees, who originated in New England and developed much of the Industrial Revolution in the United States after 1800. The stereotype first appeared in the 19th century. As Mitchell Wilson notes, "Yankee ingenuity and Yankee git-up-and-go did not exist in colonial days."

Yankee ingenuity characterizes an attitude of make-do with materials on hand. It is inventive improvisation, adaptation and overcoming of shortages of materials.

The term "Yankee ingenuity" originated from the construction of the Erie Canal across rural upstate New York. Work began in 1817. The canal opened October 26, 1825.

The term was common worldwide in the wake of World War II, as American forces employed engineering solutions to military problems. Doug Stewart notes of the jeep: "the spartan, cramped, and unstintingly functional jeep became the ubiquitous World War II four-wheeled personification of Yankee ingenuity and cocky, can-do determination." Today it refers broadly to a typically American pragmatic approach to problem solving instead of traditional methods.

An example of Yankee ingenuity would be the use of a pole saw to cut brush in the absence of a more appropriate tool.

== See also ==
- MacGyverism, a similar concept describing the resourceful use of materials at hand
- Massachusetts Route 128, also known as the "Yankee Division Highway" where many technology companies are located.
- Number 8 wire, a similar concept in New Zealand
- Jugaad – South Asian term describing a creative hack or kludge
