= Jewelry wire =

Wire used in jewelry making

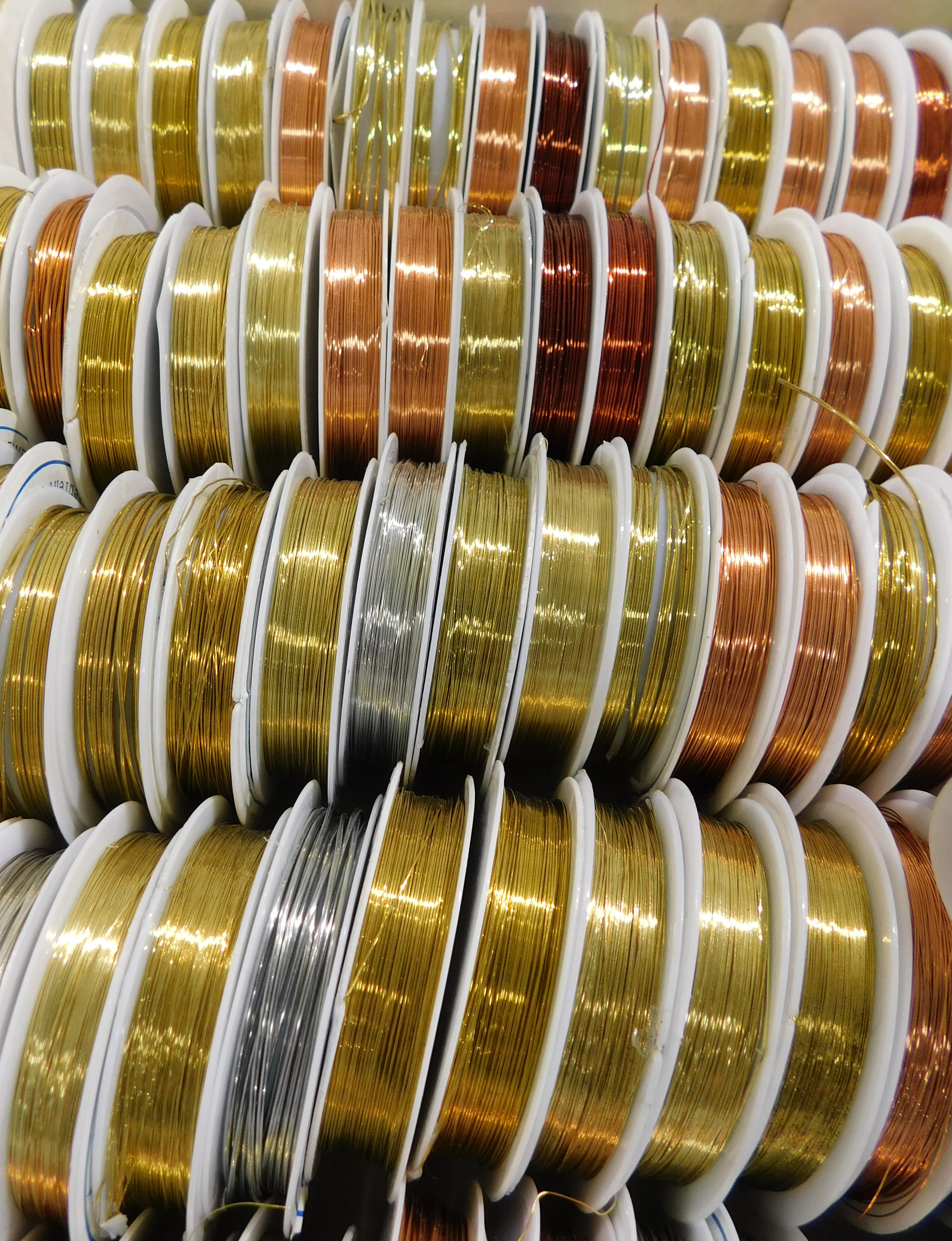
A collection of jewelers wires

Jewelry wire is wire, usually copper, brass, nickel, aluminium, silver, or gold, used in jewelry making.

Wire is defined today as a single, usually cylindrical, elongated strand of drawn metal. However, when wire was first invented over 2,000 years BC, it was made from gold nuggets pounded into flat sheets, which were then cut into strips. The strips were twisted and then rolled into the round shape we call wire. This early wire, which was used in making jewelry, can be distinguished from modern wire by the spiral line along the wire created by the edges of the sheet.

Modern wire is manufactured in a different process that was discovered in Ancient Rome. In this process, a solid metal cylinder is pulled through a draw plate with holes of a defined size. Thinner sizes of wire are made by pulling wire through successively smaller holes in the draw plate until the desired size is reached.

When wire was first invented, its use was limited to making jewelry. Today, wire is used extensively in many applications including fencing, the electronics industry, electrical distribution, and the making of wire wrapped jewelry.

== Wire hardness ==
All metals have a property called hardness, which is the property of the metal that resists bending. Soft metals are pliable and easy to bend while hard metals are stiff and hard to bend. The hardness of metals can be changed by annealing with heat treatment, or by work hardening a wire by bending it.

Most modern manufacturers of jewelry wire make the wire with a defined hardness, generally a hardness of 0, 1, 2, 3, or 4. Historically, these numbers were associated with the number of times that the wire was pulled through a draw plate, becoming harder or stiffer each time it was drawn through the drawplate. A hardness of 0 meant that the wire had been drawn through only once and was as soft and as pliable as possible. A hardness of 4 meant that the wire had been drawn through five or more times and the wire was as stiff and as hard as possible. Most jewelry wire that is sold now is designated dead soft, half-hard, or hard, where dead soft is wire that is manufactured with a hardness of 0, half-hard is wire manufactured with a hardness of 2, and fully hardened wire is wire with a hardness of 4.

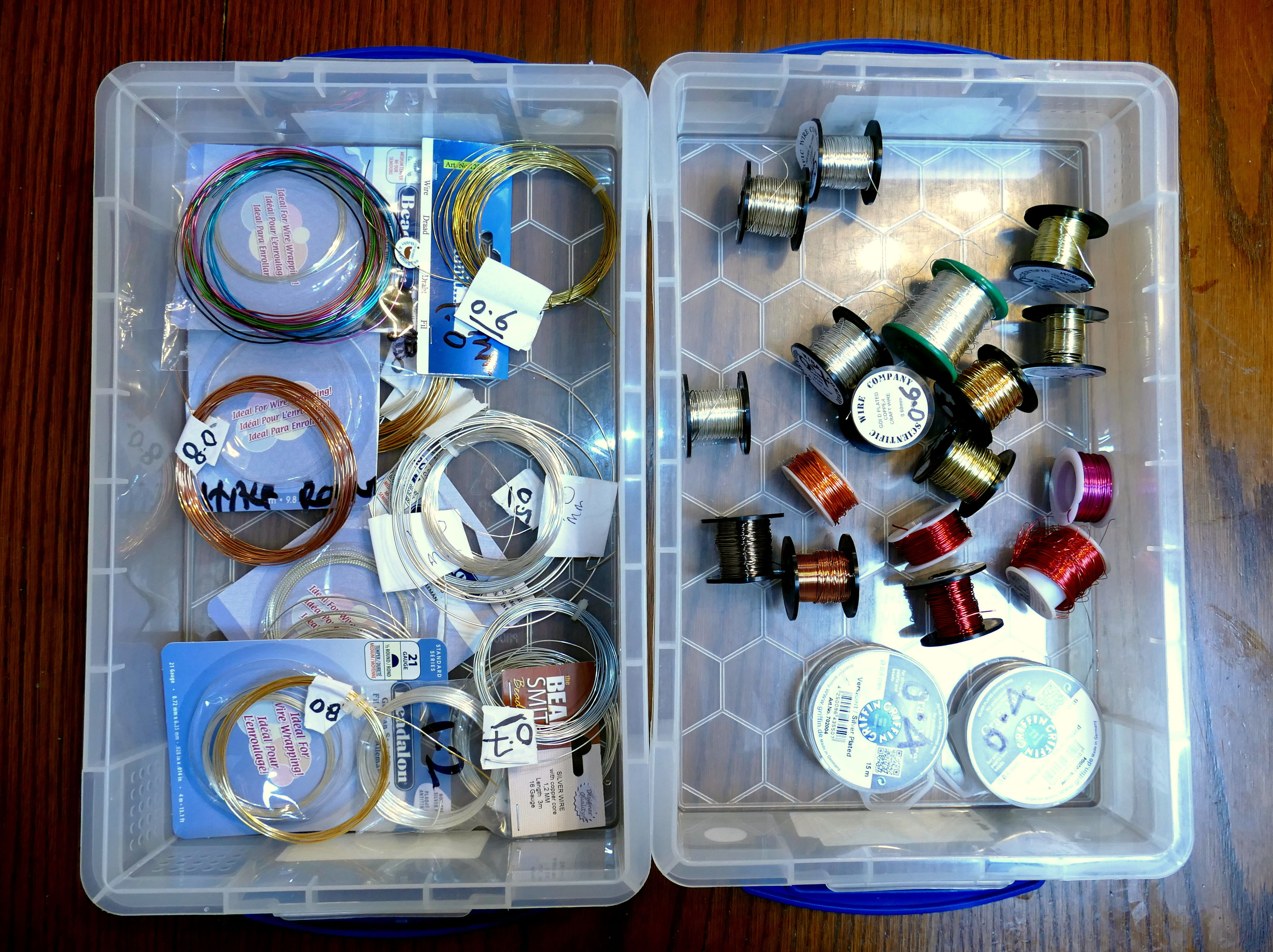
Boxes of jewellery wire. The left hand box has gold-plated, silver-plated and copper wire. The right hand box has reels of silver-plated wire at the top and reels of coloured copper wire at the bottom.

Dead soft wire is extremely soft and pliable. It can be easily bent and is excellent for making rounded shapes such as spirals. It is also excellent for wrapping wire around beads to make them look as though they are encased. The disadvantage of using soft wire is that the finished piece can be bent out of shape if not properly handled.

Half-hard wire is slightly stiffer than dead soft wire. Half-hard wire is excellent for making tight, angular bends, for making loops in wire, and for wrapping wire around itself. However, it is not very useful for making spirals. Finished pieces made with half-hard wire are usually more permanent than pieces made with soft wire.

Hard wire is very stiff and tends to spring back after being bent, making it harder to work with when using a jig; it cannot be used to make a spiral. Pieces made with hard wire have the advantage that they are not easily accidentally deformed.

As in many things, no single wire is perfect for all applications. Soft wire is easy to bend and shape, but the finished product may be bent out of shape if squeezed. Hard wire is difficult to bend but makes permanent shapes. Half-hard wire is a compromise between the two. Wire-wrapped jewelry can be made by wire which is initially soft, simplifying fabrication, but later hardened by hammering or by work hardening.

== Wire shape ==
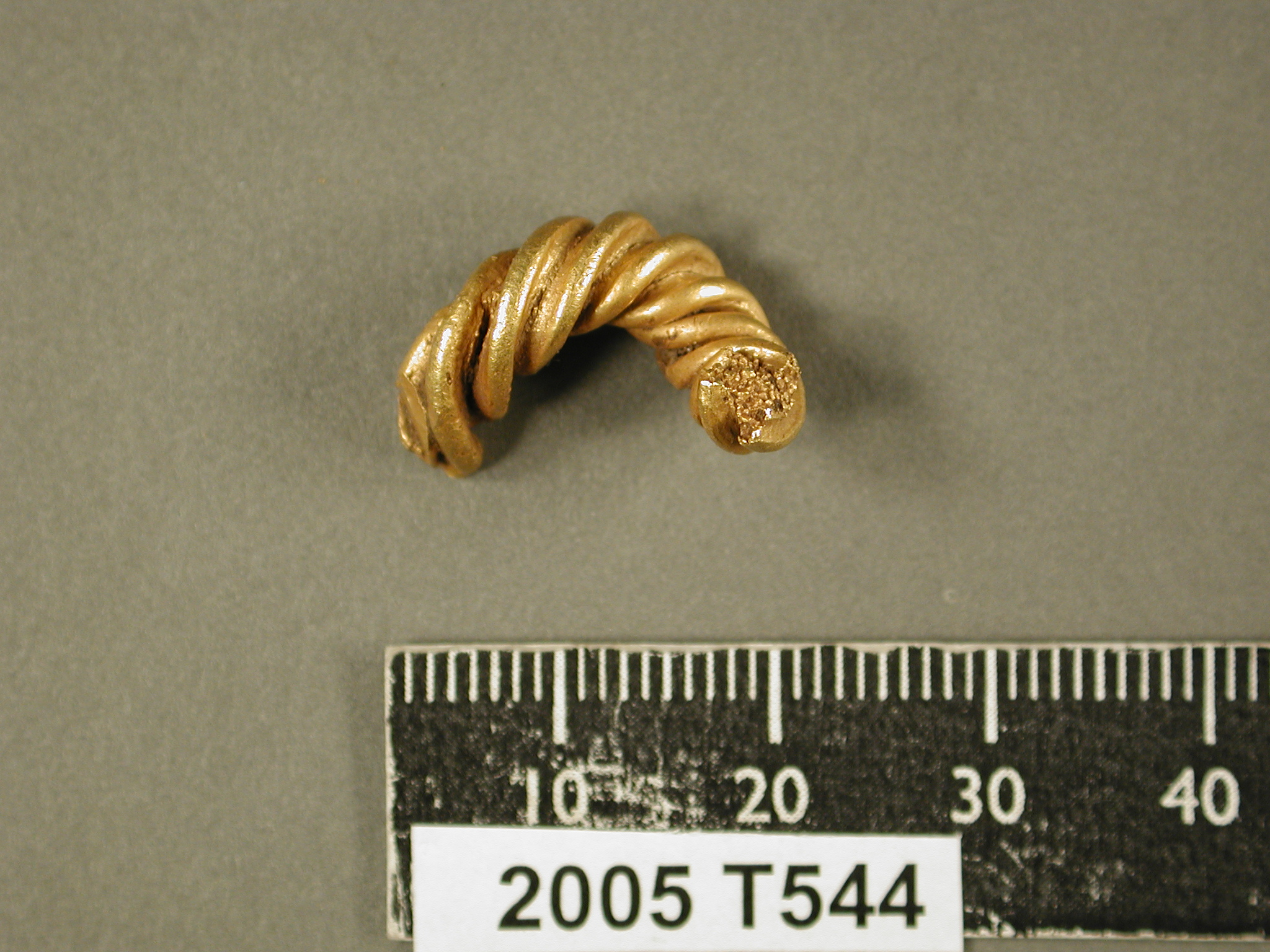
Iron Age gold wire from 'Gayton Area', Norfolk

Historically, all wire was round. Advances in technology now allow the manufacture of jewelry wire with different cross-sectional shapes, including circular, square, and half-round. Half round wire is often wrapped around other pieces of wire to connect them. Square wire is used for its appearance: the corners of the square add interest to the finished jewelry. Square wire can be twisted to create interesting visual effects.

== Wire size ==
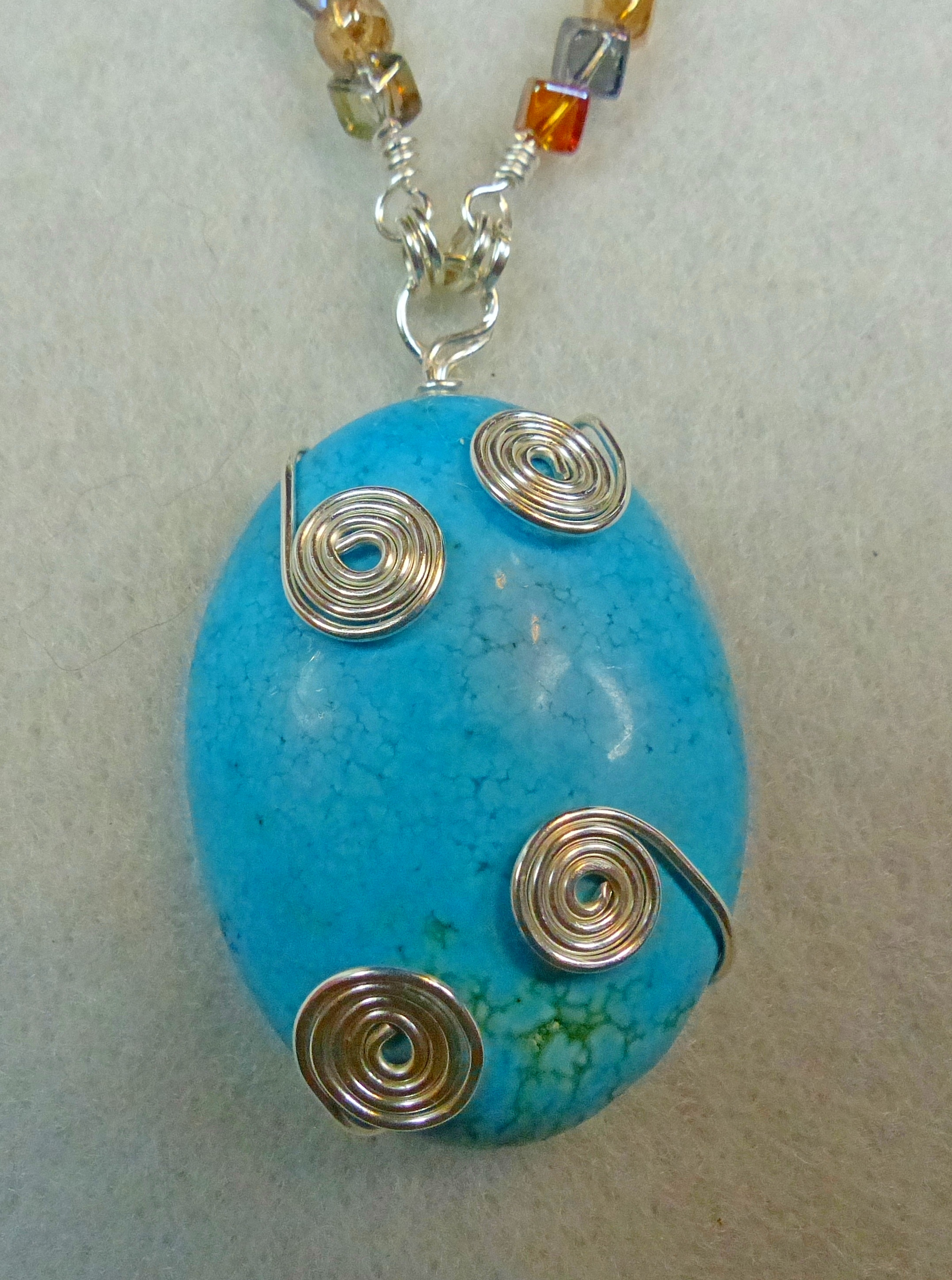
Cabochon decorated with silver-plated wire spirals

For jewelry applications, gauges 12–28 are most common. The size of wire is defined by one of two measuring systems. The American wire gauge (AWG) and the Standard wire gauge (SWG) systems. AWG is usually, but not always, the standard for defining the sizes of wire used in the United States, and SWG is usually, but not always, the standard wire sizing system used in the United Kingdom. With both the AWG and SWG systems, the larger the number, the smaller the gauge. For example: 2-gauge wire is large (like a pencil) and 30-gauge wire is fine, like thread. In much of the world wire diameter is often expressed in millimeters.

For making jump rings, 10- to 18-gauge wire (2.5 to 1.3 mm) is used. Bracelet and necklace wire components are generally made out of wire that is 16-, 18- or 20-gauge (1.3 to 0.8 mm). Earring wires are usually made out of 18- or 20-gauge wire (1.0 to 0.8 mm). When making wire wrapped jewelry, these components are connected to one another with wire that is generally 20- to 26-gauge (0.8 to 0.4 mm). Frequently the connections between wire components will include a bead on the wire connector in a technique called a wire-wrapped loop. Most glass beads (but not all) are manufactured with a hole that is 1 mm in size. This will accommodate 20-gauge wire, but will probably not accommodate 18-gauge wire. Some glass beads, almost all freshwater pearls and some gemstone beads will have smaller holes and will require the use of wire thinner than 20-gauge. (The largest wire that can go through the beads is generally chosen. Beads and gemstones are much harder than the wire, and will over time saw into the wire; so thicker wire will last longer.)

Thick wire, of 16-gauge and heavier, is harder to bend and requires more expert handling. Hammering wire with a plastic or rawhide mallet will harden wire without changing its shape. Hammering wire with a metal jeweler's hammer (chasing hammer) will harden and flatten wire.

For thickness of body jewelry sizes, gauges of all sizes can be found, notably with stretching.

== See also ==
- Body jewelry sizes – Wikipedia overview article
- Category:Jewellery components
- French wire – Type of jewellery wire
- Handmade jewelry
- Jig (jewellery) – Custom-made tool used to control the location or motion of another tool
- Wire gauge – Measurement of wire diameter
- Wire sculpture – Creating sculpture & jewelry with wire
- Wire wrapped jewelry – Technique for making jewelry
