= French wire =

Type of jewellery wire

French wire, also known as bullion or gimp, is a fine coil of silver or gold-filled wire used by jewellers to conceal beading wire next to crimps and clasps. Proponents maintain that French wire gives jewelry an elegant, professionally finished look while also protecting and strengthening the ends of the beadwork. Also widely available in silver and gold plated wire, this less expensive version is more commonly used by hobbyist beaders on seed bead and knotted pearl projects.

== See also ==
- Jewelry wire
