= Standard wire gauge =

Imperial unit for wire diameters, as defined in British Standard 3737

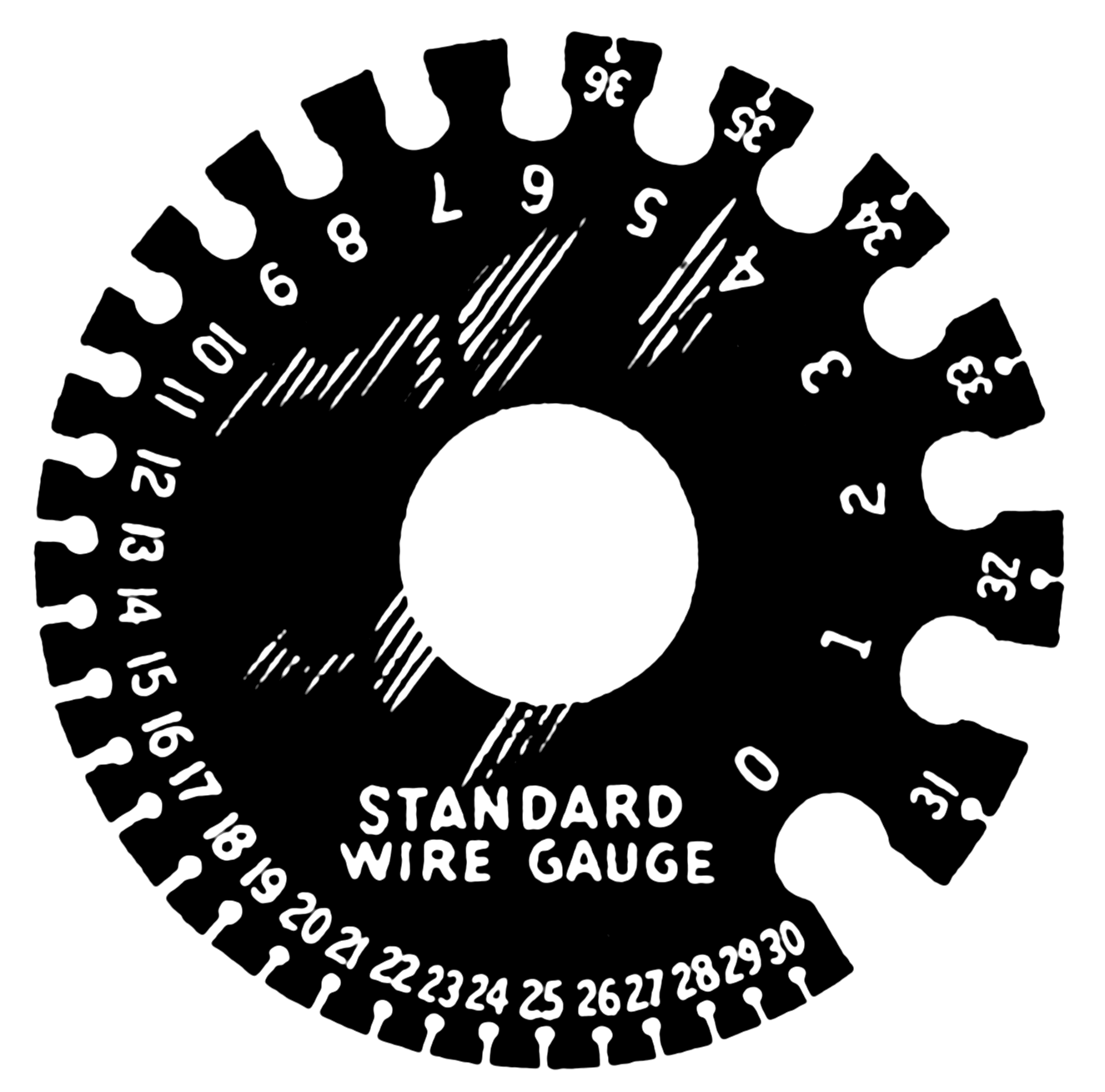
A standard wire gauge

The British Standard Wire Gauge, often referred to as the Standard Wire Gauge or simply SWG, is a unit used to denote wire gauge (size) as defined by BS 3737:1964, a standard that has since been withdrawn. It is also known as the Imperial Wire Gauge or British Standard Gauge. Although its use has significantly declined, SWG sizes are still used for measuring the thickness of bicycle spokes and certain types of electrical wire.

In modern applications, wire size is more commonly measured in terms of cross-sectional area, expressed in square millimeters, particularly for electrical installation cables. The current British Standard for metallic materials, including wires and sheets, is BS 6722:1986, which exclusively uses metric measurements.

== History ==
SWG was fixed by Order of Council August 23, 1883. It was constructed by improving the Birmingham Wire Gauge. It was made a legal standard on 1 March, 1884, by the British Board of Trade. SWG is not to be confused with American wire gauge, which has a similar but not interchangeable numbering scheme.

== Standard ==
A table of the gauge numbers and wire diameters is shown below. The basis of the system is the thou (or mil in US English), or 0.001 in. Sizes are specified as wire diameters, stated in thou and tenths of a thou (mils and tenths). The wire diameter diminishes with increasing size number. No. 7/0, the largest size, is 0.50 in. (500 thou or 12.7 mm) dia., No. 1 is 0.30 in. (300 thou), and the smallest, No. 50, is 0.001 in. (1 thou or 25.4 µm).

The system as a whole approximates an exponential curve, plotting diameter against gauge-number (each size is a approximately a constant multiple of the previous size). The weight per unit length diminishes by an average of approximately 20% at each step. Because the weight per unit length is related to the cross sectional area, and therefore to the square of the diameter, the diameter diminishes by approximately 10.6%:

$$\mbox{Diameter Ratio} = 1-\sqrt{1-0.2} \approx 10.6\%$$

However, the system is piecewise linear, only approximating the exponential curve loosely. Thus, it runs in constant steps of 0.4 thou (0.4 mil) through the range No. 49 - No. 39 and of 0.8 thou (0.8 mil) through No. 39 - No. 30.

British Standard Wire Gauge (SWG) diameters
SWG	(in)	(mm)	Step
7/0	0.500	12.700	0.036"/gauge
6/0	0.464	11.786	0.032"/gauge
5/0	0.432	10.973	0.032"/gauge
4/0	0.400	10.160	0.028"/gauge
3/0	0.372	9.449	0.024"/gauge
2/0	0.348	8.839	0.024"/gauge
0	0.324	8.230	0.024"/gauge
1	0.300	7.620	0.024"/gauge
2	0.276	7.010	0.024"/gauge
3	0.252	6.401	0.020"/gauge
4	0.232	5.893	0.020"/gauge
5	0.212	5.385	0.020"/gauge
6	0.192	4.877	0.016"/gauge
7	0.176	4.470	0.016"/gauge
8	0.160	4.064	0.016"/gauge
9	0.144	3.658	0.016"/gauge
10	0.128	3.251	0.012"/gauge
11	0.116	2.946	0.012"/gauge
12	0.104	2.642	0.012"/gauge
13	0.092	2.337	0.012"/gauge
14	0.080	2.032	0.008"/gauge
15	0.072	1.829	0.008"/gauge
16	0.064	1.626	0.008"/gauge
17	0.056	1.422	0.008"/gauge
18	0.048	1.219	0.008"/gauge
19	0.040	1.016	0.004"/gauge
20	0.036	0.914	0.004"/gauge
21	0.032	0.813	0.004"/gauge
22	0.028	0.711	0.004"/gauge
23	0.024	0.610	0.002"/gauge
24	0.022	0.559	0.002"/gauge
25	0.020	0.5080	0.002"/gauge
26	0.018	0.4572	0.0016"/gauge
27	0.0164	0.4166	0.0016"/gauge
28	0.0148	0.3759	0.0012"/gauge
29	0.0136	0.3454	0.0012"/gauge
30	0.0124	0.3150	0.0008"/gauge
31	0.0116	0.2946	0.0008"/gauge
32	0.0108	0.2743	0.0008"/gauge
33	0.0100	0.2540	0.0008"/gauge
34	0.0092	0.2337	0.0008"/gauge
35	0.0084	0.2134	0.0008"/gauge
36	0.0076	0.1930	0.0008"/gauge
37	0.0068	0.1727	0.0008"/gauge
38	0.0060	0.1524	0.0008"/gauge
39	0.0052	0.1321	0.0004"/gauge
40	0.0048	0.1219	0.0004"/gauge
41	0.0044	0.1118	0.0004"/gauge
42	0.004	0.1016	0.0004"/gauge
43	0.0036	0.0914	0.0004"/gauge
44	0.0032	0.0813	0.0004"/gauge
45	0.0028	0.0711	0.0004"/gauge
46	0.0024	0.0610	0.0004"/gauge
47	0.0020	0.0508	0.0004"/gauge
48	0.0016	0.0406	0.0004"/gauge
49	0.0012	0.0305	0.0002"/gauge
50	0.0010	0.0254	0.0002"/gauge

== See also ==
- IEC 60228, the metric wire-size standard used in most parts of the world.
- Circular mil, Electrical industry standard for wires larger than 4/0.
- American Wire Gauge (AWG), used primarily in the US and Canada
- Stubs Iron Wire Gauge
- Jewelry wire gauge
- Body jewelry sizes
- Electrical wiring
- Number 8 wire, a term used in the New Zealand vernacular
