= Birmingham gauge =

Wire gauge system used in medicine

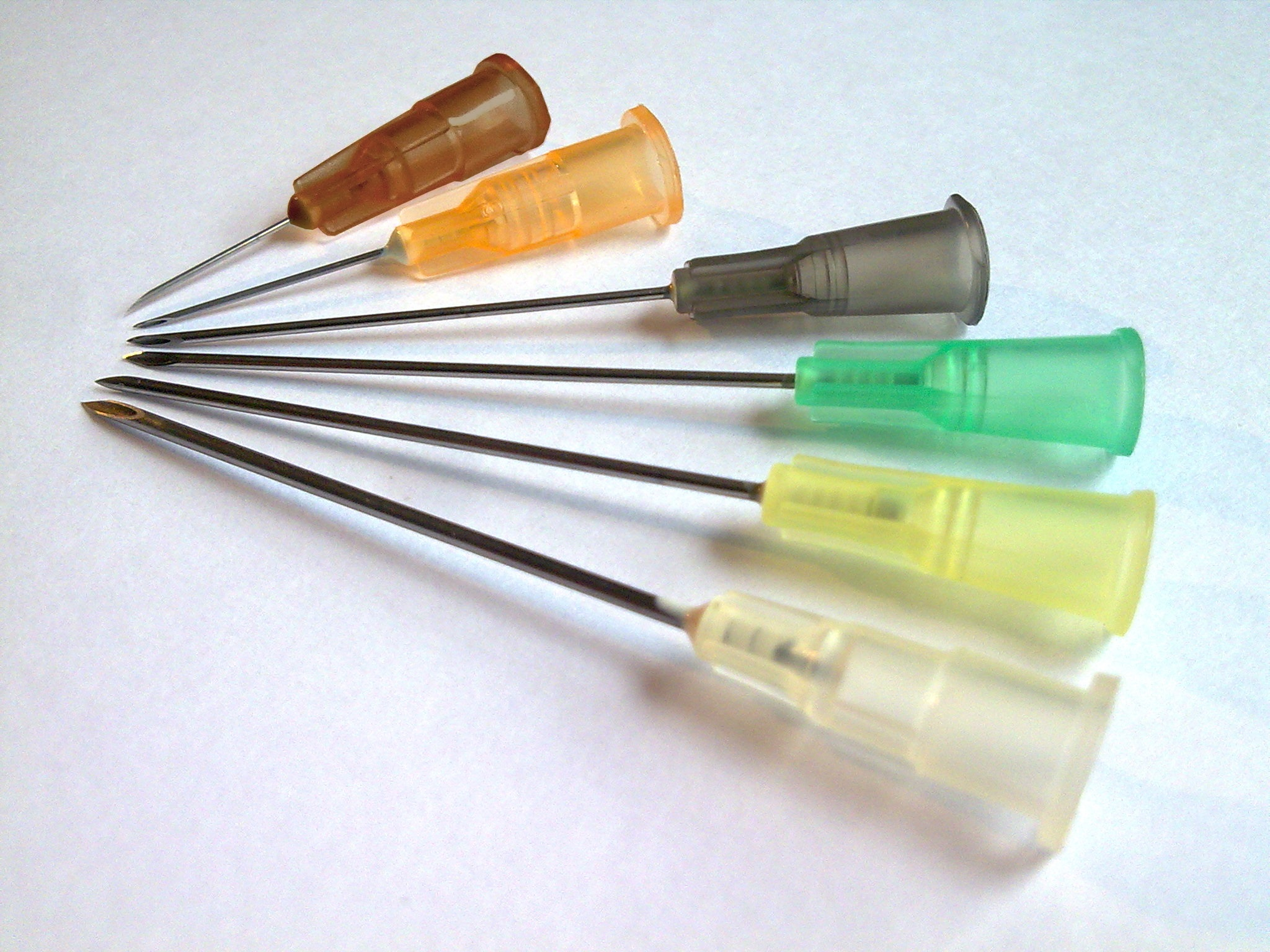
Six hypodermic needles on Luer connectors. These needles are normally used with other medical devices, such as a syringe; from top to bottom: 26G × 1/2″ (0.45 × 12 mm) (brown); 25G × 5/8″ (0.5 × 16 mm) (orange); 22G × 1 1/4″ (0.7 × 30 mm) (black); 21G × 1 1/2″ (0.8 × 40 mm) (green); 20G × 1 1/2″ (0.9 × 40 mm) (yellow); 19G × 1 1/2″ (1.1 × 40 mm) (cream)

The Birmingham gauge, officially the Birmingham Wire Gauge and often abbreviated as G or ga, is a unit of wire gauge used to measure the thickness or diameter of wires and tubing, including hypodermic needles and other medical tube products.

== Terminology ==
The Birmingham gauge is also known as the Stubs Iron Wire Gauge or Birmingham Wire Gauge and is distinct from the Stubs Steel Wire Gauge and the British Standard Wire Gauge. It is commonly referred to simply as gauge (abbreviated as G), but this should not be confused with the French gauge, a separate system used for measuring the outer diameter of catheters.

Its name derives from the English city of Birmingham, which was a major copper wire manufacturing hub in the 19th century. Birmingham wire factories were the first in Britain to standardize a set of gauges known as the Old British Wire-Gauge. In 1857, the U.S.-based Association of Brass Wire and Sheet Manufacturers commissioned the Brown & Sharpe firm to reconfigure the dimensions of the Old British Wire-Gauge. This modified version was then marketed as the Birmingham gauge throughout the United States, leading to the term’s widespread global adoption.

== System ==
The Birmingham gauge ranges from 5/0 or 00000, the lowest gauge number corresponding to the largest size of 0.500 inches (12.7 mm), to 36, the highest gauge number corresponding to the smallest size of 0.004 inches (0.10 mm). The increments between gauge sizes are not linear and vary. At higher gauge numbers, the increment between the two highest gauges is 0.001 inches (0.025 mm), while at lower gauge numbers, the increment between the two lowest gauges is 0.046 inches (1.2 mm). This progression does not follow a mathematical formula; instead, it reflects historical manufacturing practices in the wire drawing industry, where the size increments were determined by practical tooling, such as a draw plate, and production constraints. In applications involving wires and fine tubing, the gauge number refers to the product's outside diameter. For larger mechanical tubing, however, the gauge number indicates the wall thickness, independent of the tube's overall size.

In medicine, the Birmingham gauge is widely used to specify the outer diameter of hypodermic needles, catheters, cannulae, and suture wires. However, catheters are more commonly defined using the French catheter gauge. The Birmingham gauge was originally developed in early 19th-century England for wire manufacturing and became common in medical settings in the early 20th century.

The Birmingham gauge system is also recognized in international medical standards, such as ISO 6009:2016, which includes a color-coding system for hypodermic needles. This standardization helps ensure accurate identification and compatibility of medical equipment.

== Sizes of hypodermic needles ==
Hypodermic needles are available in a wide variety of outer diameters described by gauge numbers. Smaller gauge numbers indicate larger outer diameters. Inner diameter depends on both gauge and wall thickness. The following chart shows nominal inner diameter and wall thickness for regular-wall needles. Thin-wall needles (not shown) have identical outer diameters but larger inner diameters for a given gauge.

Gauge, G	Nominal outer diameter		Nominal inner diameter (Note: Not strictly defined, and may vary for a given gauge.)		Nominal wall thickness		ISO 6009 color
Gauge, G	(inch)	(mm)	(inch)	(mm)	(inch)	(mm)	ISO 6009 color
7	0.180 ± 0.001	4.572 ± 0.025	0.150 ± 0.003	3.810 ± 0.076	0.015 ± 0.001	0.381 ± 0.025	(undefined)
8	0.165 ± 0.001	4.191 ± 0.025	0.135 ± 0.003	3.429 ± 0.076	0.015 ± 0.001	0.381 ± 0.025	(undefined)
9	0.148 ± 0.001	3.759 ± 0.025	0.118 ± 0.003	2.997 ± 0.076	0.015 ± 0.001	0.381 ± 0.025	(undefined)
10	0.134 ± 0.001	3.404 ± 0.025	0.106 ± 0.003	2.692 ± 0.076	0.014 ± 0.001	0.356 ± 0.025	Olive brown
11	0.120 ± 0.001	3.048 ± 0.025	0.094 ± 0.003	2.388 ± 0.076	0.013 ± 0.001	0.330 ± 0.025	Green-yellow
12	0.109 ± 0.001	2.769 ± 0.025	0.085 ± 0.003	2.159 ± 0.076	0.012 ± 0.001	0.305 ± 0.025	Pale blue
13	0.095 ± 0.001	2.413 ± 0.025	0.071 ± 0.003	1.803 ± 0.076	0.012 ± 0.001	0.305 ± 0.025	Purple
14	0.083 ± 0.001	2.108 ± 0.025	0.063 ± 0.003	1.600 ± 0.076	0.010 ± 0.001	0.254 ± 0.025	Pale green
15	0.0720 ± 0.0005	1.829 ± 0.013	0.0540 ± 0.0015	1.372 ± 0.038	0.0090 ± 0.0005	0.229 ± 0.013	Blue-grey
16	0.0650 ± 0.0005	1.651 ± 0.013	0.0470 ± 0.0015	1.194 ± 0.038	0.0090 ± 0.0005	0.229 ± 0.013	White
17	0.0580 ± 0.0005	1.473 ± 0.013	0.0420 ± 0.0015	1.067 ± 0.038	0.0080 ± 0.0005	0.203 ± 0.013	Red-violet
18	0.0500 ± 0.0005	1.270 ± 0.013	0.0330 ± 0.0015	0.838 ± 0.038	0.0085 ± 0.0005	0.216 ± 0.013	Pink
19	0.0420 ± 0.0005	1.067 ± 0.013	0.0270 ± 0.0015	0.686 ± 0.038	0.0075 ± 0.0005	0.191 ± 0.013	Cream
20	0.03575 ± 0.00025	0.9081 ± 0.0064	0.02375 ± 0.00075	0.603 ± 0.019	0.00600 ± 0.00025	0.1524 ± 0.0064	Yellow
21	0.03225 ± 0.00025	0.8192 ± 0.0064	0.02025 ± 0.00075	0.514 ± 0.019	0.00600 ± 0.00025	0.1524 ± 0.0064	Deep green
22	0.02825 ± 0.00025	0.7176 ± 0.0064	0.01625 ± 0.00075	0.413 ± 0.019	0.00600 ± 0.00025	0.1524 ± 0.0064	Black
22s	0.02825 ± 0.00025	0.7176 ± 0.0064	0.00600 ± 0.00075	0.152 ± 0.019	0.01110 ± 0.00025	0.2826 ± 0.0064	(undefined)
23	0.02525 ± 0.00025	0.6414 ± 0.0064	0.01325 ± 0.00075	0.337 ± 0.019	0.00600 ± 0.00025	0.1524 ± 0.0064	Deep blue
24	0.02225 ± 0.00025	0.5652 ± 0.0064	0.01225 ± 0.00075	0.311 ± 0.019	0.00500 ± 0.00025	0.1270 ± 0.0064	Medium purple
25	0.02025 ± 0.00025	0.5144 ± 0.0064	0.01025 ± 0.00075	0.260 ± 0.019	0.00500 ± 0.00025	0.1270 ± 0.0064	Orange
26	0.01825 ± 0.00025	0.4636 ± 0.0064	0.01025 ± 0.00075	0.260 ± 0.019	0.00400 ± 0.00025	0.1016 ± 0.0064	Brown
26s	0.01865 ± 0.00025	0.4737 ± 0.0064	0.00500 ± 0.00075	0.127 ± 0.019	0.00680 ± 0.00025	0.1734 ± 0.0064	(undefined)
27	0.01625 ± 0.00025	0.4128 ± 0.0064	0.00825 ± 0.00075	0.210 ± 0.019	0.00400 ± 0.00025	0.1016 ± 0.0064	Medium grey
28	0.01425 ± 0.00025	0.3620 ± 0.0064	0.00725 ± 0.00075	0.184 ± 0.019	0.00350 ± 0.00025	0.0889 ± 0.0064	Blue-green
29	0.01325 ± 0.00025	0.3366 ± 0.0064	0.00725 ± 0.00075	0.184 ± 0.019	0.00300 ± 0.00025	0.0762 ± 0.0064	Red
30	0.01225 ± 0.00025	0.3112 ± 0.0064	0.00625 ± 0.00075	0.159 ± 0.019	0.00300 ± 0.00025	0.0762 ± 0.0064	Yellow
31	0.01025 ± 0.00025	0.2604 ± 0.0064	0.00525 ± 0.00075	0.133 ± 0.019	0.00250 ± 0.00025	0.0635 ± 0.0064	White
32	0.00925 ± 0.00025	0.2350 ± 0.0064	0.00425 ± 0.00075	0.108 ± 0.019	0.00250 ± 0.00025	0.0635 ± 0.0064	Deep green
33	0.00825 ± 0.00025	0.2096 ± 0.0064	0.00425 ± 0.00075	0.108 ± 0.019	0.00200 ± 0.00025	0.0508 ± 0.0064	Black
34	0.00725 ± 0.00025	0.1842 ± 0.0064	0.00325 ± 0.00075	0.0826 ± 0.019	0.00200 ± 0.00025	0.0508 ± 0.0064	Orange

Rapid blood transfusion through 23G or smaller needles can cause hemolysis (rupturing of red blood cells).

== Sizes of catheters ==
This includes peripheral venous catheters. The gauge compared to outer diameter is the same as for needles, but the color coding is different.

Gauge	Outer diameter (mm)	Maximum flow rate (mL/min)	Color
14	2.0	250–300	Orange
16	1.7	180	Grey
18	1.3	75–120	Green
20	1.1	40–80	Pink
22	0.9	42-55	Blue
24	0.7	20-35	Yellow
26	0.6	10-13	Black

== See also ==
- Wire gauge, including other systems
- French gauge, mainly for catheters
- American Wire Gauge
