= American wire gauge =

North American standard for electrical-wire diameters

American Wire Gauge (AWG) is a logarithmic stepped standardized wire gauge system used since 1857, predominantly in North America, for the diameters of round, solid, nonferrous, electrically conducting wire. Dimensions of the wires are given in ASTM standard B 258. The cross-sectional area of each gauge is an important factor for determining its current-carrying capacity.

== Origin ==
The AWG originated in the number of drawing operations used to produce a given gauge of wire. Very fine wire (for example, 30 gauge) required more passes through the drawing dies than 0 gauge wire did. Manufacturers of wire formerly had proprietary wire gauge systems; the development of standardized wire gauges rationalized selection of wire for a particular purpose.

While the AWG is essentially identical to the Brown & Sharpe (B&S) sheet metal gauge, the B&S gauge was designed for use with sheet metals. These are functionally interchangeable, but the use of B&S in relation to wire gauges, rather than sheet metal gauges, is technically improper.

== Specifications ==
Increasing gauge numbers denote logarithmically decreasing wire diameters, which is similar to many other non-metric gauging systems such as British Standard Wire Gauge (SWG). However, AWG is dissimilar to IEC 60228, the metric wire-size standard used in most parts of the world, based directly on the wire cross-section area (in square millimetres, mm^{2}).

The AWG tables are for a single, solid and round conductor. The AWG of a stranded wire is determined by the cross-sectional area of the equivalent solid conductor. Because there are also small gaps between the strands, a stranded wire will always have a slightly larger overall diameter than a solid wire with the same AWG.

=== Formulae ===
By definition, 36 AWG is 0.005 inches in diameter, and 0000 AWG is 0.46 inches (11.68 mm) in diameter. The ratio of these diameters is 1:92, and there are 40 gauge sizes from 36 to 0000, or 39 steps. Because each successive gauge number increases cross sectional area by a constant multiple, diameters vary geometrically. Any two successive gauges (e.g., A and B) have diameters whose ratio (dia. B ÷ dia. A) is $\sqrt [39]{92}$ (approximately 1.1229), while for gauges two steps apart (e.g., A, B, and C), the ratio of C to A is about 1.1229^{2} ≈ 1.2610. Similarly for gauges n steps apart, the diameter ratio of the first to last gauges is about 1.1229^{n}.

The diameter of an AWG wire is determined according to the following formula:

$$d_n = 0.005~\mathrm{inch} \times 92^{(36 - n)/39} = 0.127~\mathrm{mm} \times 92^{(36 - n)/39}$$

Where n is the AWG size for gauges from 36 to 0. For larger gauges n = −1 for 00, n = −2 for 000, and n = −3 for 0000.

or equivalently:

$$d_n = e^{-1.12436 - 0.11594n}\ \mathrm{inch} = e^{2.1104 - 0.11594n}\ \mathrm{mm}$$

The gauge can be calculated from the diameter using

$$n = -39\log_{92} \left( \frac{d_n}{0.005~\mathrm{inch}} \right) + 36 = -39\log_{92} \left( \frac{d_n}{0.127~\mathrm{mm}} \right) + 36$$

and the cross-section area is

$$A_n = \frac{\pi}{4} d_n^2 \approx 0.000019635~\mathrm{inch}^2 \times 92^{(36 - n)/19.5} \approx 0.012668~\mathrm{mm}^2 \times 92^{(36 - n)/19.5}$$.

The standard ASTM B258-02 (2008), Standard Specification for Standard Nominal Diameters and Cross-Sectional Areas of AWG Sizes of Solid Round Wires Used as Electrical Conductors, defines the ratio between successive sizes to be the 39th root of 92, or approximately 1.1229. ASTM B258-02 also dictates that wire diameters should be tabulated with no more than 4 significant figures, with a resolution of no more than 0.0001 inches (0.1 mils) for wires thicker than 44 AWG, and 0.00001 inches (0.01 mils) for wires 45 AWG and thinner.

Sizes with multiple zeros are successively thicker than 0 AWG and can be denoted using "number of zeros/0", for example 4/0 AWG for 0000 AWG. For an m/0 AWG wire, use n = −(m − 1) = 1 − m in the above formulas. For instance, for 0000 AWG or 4/0 AWG, use n = −3.

==== Rules of thumb ====
The sixth power of $\sqrt[39]{92}$ is very close to 2, which leads to the following rules of thumb:

- When the cross-sectional area of a wire is doubled, the AWG will decrease by 3; for example, two 14 AWG wires have about the same cross-sectional area as a single 11 AWG wire. This doubles the electrical conductance.
- When the diameter of a solid round wire is doubled, the AWG will decrease by 6; for example, 1 mm diameter wire is ≈18 AWG, 2 mm diameter wire is ≈12 AWG, and 4 mm diameter wire is ≈6 AWG. This quadruples the cross-sectional area and conductance.
- A decrease of ten gauge numbers; for example, from 24 AWG to 14 AWG multiplies the area, weight, and conductance by approximately 10.

Convenient coincidences result in the following rules of thumb for resistances:

- The resistance of copper wire is approximately (1 Ω)/(1000 ft) for 10 AWG, (10 Ω)/(1000 ft) for 20 AWG, (100 Ω)/(1000 ft) for 30 AWG, and so on. For an arbitrary gauge n, it is approximately 10^{n/10} Ω per 10000 ft.
- Because aluminum wire has a conductivity of approximately 61% of copper, an aluminum wire has nearly the same resistance as a copper wire that is two sizes smaller, which has 62.9% of the area.

=== Tables of AWG wire sizes ===
The table below shows various data including both the resistance of the various wire gauges and the allowable current (ampacity) based on a copper conductor with plastic insulation. The diameter information in the table applies to solid wires. Stranded wires are calculated by calculating the equivalent cross sectional copper wire area. Fusing current (melting wire) is estimated based on 25 °C (77 °F) ambient temperature. The table below assumes DC, or AC frequencies equal to or less than 60 Hz, and does not take skin effect into account. "Turns of wire per unit length" refers to wire wound in a helix with the turns touching, as in a solenoid and is therefore the reciprocal of the conductor diameter. As wire in such a coil normally has insulation, this figure forms an upper bound.

AWG	Diameter		Turns of wire, without insulation		Area		Copper wire							
AWG	Diameter		Turns of wire, without insulation		Area		Length-specific resistance		Ampacity at temperature rating (A) (Note: For enclosed wire at 30 °C ambient, with given insulation material temperature rating, or for single unbundled wires in equipment for 16 AWG and thinner.)			Fusing current		
AWG	Diameter		Turns of wire, without insulation		Area		Length-specific resistance		Ampacity at temperature rating (A)			Preece	Onderdonk	
AWG	(in)	(mm)	(per in)	(per cm)	(kcmil)	(mm^{2})	(mΩ/m (Note: or, equivalently, Ω/km))	(mΩ/ft (Note: or, equivalently, Ω/kft))	60 °C	75 °C	90 °C	~10 s	1 s	32 ms
0000 (4/0)	0.4600 (Note: Exactly, by definition)	11.684	2.17	0.856	212	107	0.1608	0.04901	195	230	260	3.2 kA	33 kA	182 kA
000 (3/0)	0.4096	10.405	2.44	0.961	168	85.0	0.2028	0.06180	165	200	225	2.7 kA	26 kA	144 kA
00 (2/0)	0.3648	9.266	2.74	1.08	133	67.4	0.2557	0.07793	145	175	195	2.3 kA	21 kA	115 kA
0 (1/0)	0.3249	8.251	3.08	1.21	106	53.5	0.3224	0.09827	125	150	170	1.9 kA	16 kA	91 kA
1	0.2893	7.348	3.46	1.36	83.7	42.4	0.4066	0.1239	110	130	145	1.6 kA	13 kA	72 kA
2	0.2576	6.544	3.88	1.53	66.4	33.6	0.5127	0.1563	95	115	130	1.3 kA	10.2 kA	57 kA
3	0.2294	5.827	4.36	1.72	52.6	26.7	0.6465	0.1970	85	100	115	1.1 kA	8.1 kA	45 kA
4	0.2043	5.189	4.89	1.93	41.7	21.2	0.8152	0.2485	70	85	95	946 A	6.4 kA	36 kA
5	0.1819	4.621	5.50	2.16	33.1	16.8	1.028	0.3133				795 A	5.1 kA	28 kA
6	0.1620	4.115	6.17	2.43	26.3	13.3	1.296	0.3951	55	65	75	668 A	4.0 kA	23 kA
7	0.1443	3.665	6.93	2.73	20.8	10.5	1.634	0.4982				561 A	3.2 kA	18 kA
8	0.1285	3.264	7.78	3.06	16.5	8.37	2.061	0.6282	40	50	55	472 A	2.5 kA	14 kA
9	0.1144	2.906	8.74	3.44	13.1	6.63	2.599	0.7921				396 A	2.0 kA	11 kA
10	0.1019	2.588	9.81	3.86	10.4	5.26	3.277	0.9989	30	35	40	333 A	1.6 kA	8.9 kA
11	0.0907	2.305	11.0	4.34	8.23	4.17	4.132	1.260				280 A	1.3 kA	7.1 kA
12	0.0808	2.053	12.4	4.87	6.53	3.31	5.211	1.588	20	25	30	235 A	1.0 kA	5.6 kA
13	0.0720	1.828	13.9	5.47	5.18	2.62	6.571	2.003				198 A	798 A	4.5 kA
14	0.0641	1.628	15.6	6.14	4.11	2.08	8.286	2.525	15	20	25	166 A	633 A	3.5 kA
15	0.0571	1.450	17.5	6.90	3.26	1.65	10.45	3.184				140 A	502 A	2.8 kA
16	0.0508	1.291	19.7	7.75	2.58	1.31	13.17	4.016	12	16	18	117 A	398 A	2.2 kA
17	0.0453	1.150	22.1	8.70	2.05	1.04	16.61	5.064				99 A	316 A	1.8 kA
18	0.0403	1.024	24.8	9.77	1.62	0.823	20.95	6.385	10	14	16	83 A	250 A	1.4 kA
19	0.0359	0.912	27.9	11.0	1.29	0.653	26.42	8.051	—	—	—	70 A	198 A	1.1 kA
20	0.0320	0.812	31.3	12.3	1.02	0.518	33.31	10.15	5	11	—	58.5 A	158 A	882 A
21	0.0285	0.723	35.1	13.8	0.810	0.410	42.00	12.80	—	—	—	49 A	125 A	700 A
22	0.0253	0.644	39.5	15.5	0.642	0.326	52.96	16.14	3	7	—	41 A	99 A	551 A
23	0.0226	0.573	44.3	17.4	0.509	0.258	66.79	20.36	—	—	—	35 A	79 A	440 A
24	0.0201	0.511	49.7	19.6	0.404	0.205	84.22	25.67	2.1	3.5	—	29 A	62 A	348 A
25	0.0179	0.455	55.9	22.0	0.320	0.162	106.2	32.37	—	—	—	24 A	49 A	276 A
26	0.0159	0.405	62.7	24.7	0.254	0.129	133.9	40.81	1.3	2.2	—	20 A	39 A	218 A
27	0.0142	0.361	70.4	27.7	0.202	0.102	168.9	51.47	—	—	—	17 A	31 A	174 A
28	0.0126	0.321	79.1	31.1	0.160	0.0810	212.9	64.90	0.83	1.4	—	14 A	24 A	137 A
29	0.0113	0.286	88.8	35.0	0.127	0.0642	268.5	81.84	—	—	—	12 A	20 A	110 A
30	0.0100	0.255	99.7	39.3	0.101	0.0509	338.6	103.2	0.52	0.86	—	10 A	15 A	86 A
31	0.00893	0.227	112	44.1	0.0797	0.0404	426.9	130.1	—	—	—	9 A	12 A	69 A
32	0.00795	0.202	126	49.5	0.0632	0.0320	538.3	164.1	0.32	0.53	—	7 A	10 A	54 A
33	0.00708	0.180	141	55.6	0.0501	0.0254	678.8	206.9	—	—	—	6 A	7.7 A	43 A
34	0.00630	0.160	159	62.4	0.0398	0.0201	856.0	260.9	0.18	0.3	—	5 A	6.1 A	34 A
35	0.00561	0.143	178	70.1	0.0315	0.0160	1079	329.0	—	—	—	4 A	4.8 A	27 A
36	0.00500	0.127	200	78.7	0.0250	0.0127	1361	414.8	—	—	—	4 A	3.9 A	22 A
37	0.00445	0.113	225	88.4	0.0198	0.0100	1716	523.1	—	—	—	3 A	3.1 A	17 A
38	0.00397	0.101	252	99.3	0.0157	0.00797	2164	659.6	—	—	—	3 A	2.4 A	14 A
39	0.00353	0.0897	283	111	0.0125	0.00632	2729	831.8	—	—	—	2 A	1.9 A	11 A
40	0.00314	0.0799	318	125	0.00989	0.00501	3441	1049	—	—	—	1 A	1.5 A	8.5 A

In the North American electrical industry, conductors thicker than 4/0 AWG are generally identified by the area in thousands of circular mils (kcmil), where 1 kcmil = 0.5067 mm^{2}. The next wire size thicker than 4/0 has a cross section of 250 kcmil. A circular mil is the area of a wire one mil in diameter. One million circular mils is the area of a circle with 1,000 mil (1 inch) diameter. An older abbreviation for one thousand circular mils is MCM.

=== Stranded wire AWG sizes ===
AWG can also be used to describe stranded wire. The AWG size of a stranded wire represents the sum of the cross-sectional diameter of the individual strands; the gaps between strands are not counted. When made with circular strands, these gaps occupy about 25% of the wire area, thus requiring the overall bundle diameter to be about 13% larger than a solid wire of equal gauge.

Stranded wires are specified with three numbers, the overall AWG size, the number of strands, and the AWG size of a strand. The number of strands and the AWG size of a strand are separated by a slash. For example, a 22 AWG 7/30 stranded wire is a 22 AWG wire made from seven strands of 30 AWG wire.

As indicated in the Formulae and Rules of thumb sections above, differences in AWG size translate directly into ratios of diameter or area. This property can be employed to easily find the AWG size of a stranded bundle by measuring the diameter and count of its strands. (This only applies to bundles with circular strands of identical size.) To find the AWG size of 7-strand wire with equal strands, subtract 8.4 from the AWG size of a strand. Similarly, for 19-strand subtract 12.7, and for 37 subtract 15.6.

Measuring strand diameter is often easier and more accurate than attempting to measure bundle diameter and packing ratio. Such measurement can be done with a wire gauge go-no-go tool or with a caliper or micrometer.

== Nomenclature and abbreviations in electrical distribution ==
Alternative ways are commonly used in the electrical industry to specify wire sizes as AWG.

- 4 AWG (proper)
  - #4 (the number sign is used as an abbreviation of "number")
  - № 4 (the numero sign is used as an abbreviation for "number")
  - No. 4 (an approximation of the numero is used as an abbreviation for "number")
  - No. 4 AWG
  - 4 ga. (abbreviation for "gauge")
- 000 AWG (proper for thick sizes)
  - 3/0 (common for thick sizes) Pronounced "three-aught" or "triple-aught"
  - 3/0 AWG
  - #000

=== Pronunciation ===
AWG is colloquially referred to as gauge and the zeros in thick wire sizes are referred to as aught /ˈɔːt/. Wire sized 1 AWG is referred to as "one gauge" or "No. 1" wire; similarly, thinner sizes are pronounced "x gauge" or "No. x" wire, where x is the positive-integer AWG number. Consecutive AWG wire sizes thicker than No. 1 wire are designated by the number of zeros:

- No. 0, often written 1/0 and referred to as "one-aught" or "single-aught" wire
- No. 00, often written 2/0 and referred to as "two-aught" or "double-aught" wire
- No. 000, often written 3/0 and referred to as "three-aught" or "triple-aught" wire

and so on.

== See also ==
- IEC 60228, international standards for wire sizes
- French gauge
- Brown & Sharpe
- Circular mil, North American Electrical industry standard for wires thicker than 4/0.
- Standard wire gauge or SWG, has a similar but not interchangeable numbering scheme to AWG.
- Birmingham Wire Gauge
- Stubs Iron Wire Gauge
- Jewelry wire
- Body jewelry sizes, which commonly uses AWG especially for thinner sizes, even when the material is not metallic.
- Electrical conductor
- Electrical wiring
- Number 8 wire, a term used in the New Zealand vernacular
