= Thousandth of an inch =

Non-metric unit of length

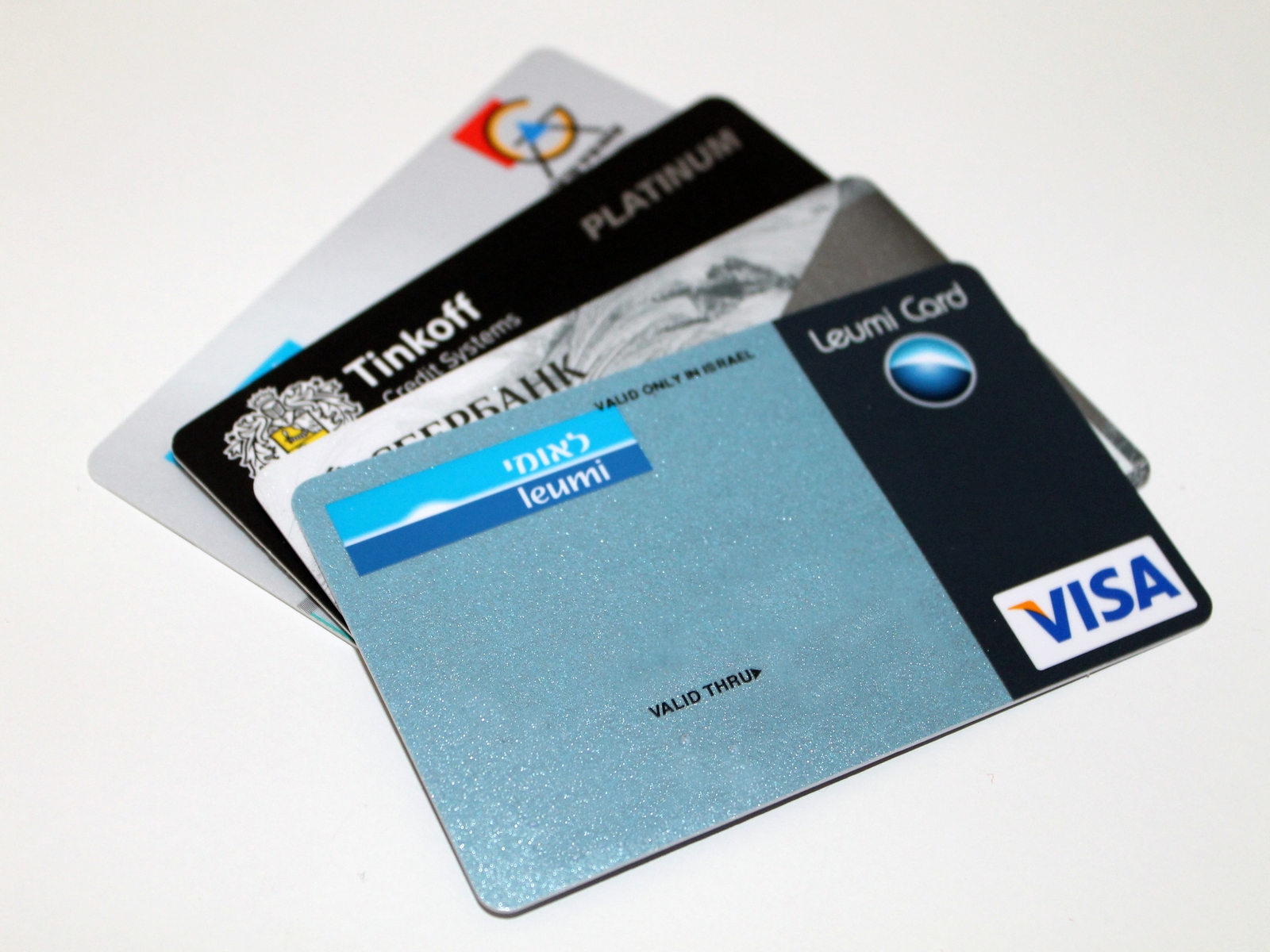
- ID-1 cards like payment cards have a thickness of 0.03 inches (30 thou).

General information
- Unit system: Imperial/US units
- Unit of: Length
- Symbol: thou, mil

Conversions
| 1 thou in ... | ... is equal to ... |
- imperial/US units: 0.001 in
- SI units: 25.4 μm

A thousandth of an inch is a derived unit of length in a system of units using inches. Equal to 1/1000 of an inch, a thousandth is commonly called a thou /ˈθaʊ/ (used for both singular and plural) or, particularly in North America, a mil (plural mils).

The words are shortened forms of the English and Latin words for "thousand" (mille in Latin). In international engineering contexts, confusion can arise because mil is a formal unit name in North America but mil or mill is also a common colloquial clipped form of millimetre. The units are considerably different: a millimetre is approximately 39 mils.

== Contexts of use ==
The thou, or mil, is most commonly used in engineering and manufacturing in non-metric countries. For example, in specifying:

- The thickness of items such as paper, film, foil, wires, paint coatings, latex gloves, plastic sheeting, and fibers
  - For example, most plastic ID cards are about 30 thou (0.76 mm) in thickness.
  - Card stock thickness in the United States, where mils are also called points.
  - Gauge (diameter) of strings in stringed instruments
- Manufacturing dimensions and tolerances, such as:
  - In the manufacture of older automobile engines. A typical example is the thickness of the head gasket, or the amount of material to be removed from the head to adjust the compression ratio of the cylinders.
  - In the servicing of older automobile engines. Typical examples include a spark-plug gap or ignition points gap.
  - The manufacture of printed circuit boards (PCBs). However, the component dimensions are now typically provided in millimetres, because they are sold worldwide.
  - the pin pitch of semiconductor packages
  - Tolerance specifications on hydraulic cylinders

There are also compound units such as "mils per year" used to express corrosion rates.

=== Mil-measurements ===
The word "mil" appears in the following different units:

- linear mil = 0.0254 mm (0.001 in)
- square mil = 0.00064516 mm^{2} (1.0×10^{−6} sq in)
- circular mil = 0.0005067 mm^{2} (7.854×10^{−7} sq in) = π/4 square mil
- angular mil ≈ 1 milliradian ≈ 0.057296 degrees (also known as NATO mil)

=== Tenths ===
In areas of machining where the thou is used, 0.0001 inches (2.54 micrometres) is often treated as a basic unit and can be referred to as "one tenth", meaning "one tenth of a thou" or "one ten thousandth". Other common terms used in machining with Imperial units involve adding tenths together to achieve a specific tolerance or measurement. For example, "five tenths," is typically a measurement or tolerance of five ten-thousandths of an inch, and written as 0.0005 inches. "Three tenths," as another example, is written as 0.0003 inches.

Machining "to within a few tenths" is often considered very accurate, and at or near the extreme limit of tolerance capability in most contexts. Greater accuracy (tolerance ranges inside one tenth) apply in only a few contexts: in plug gauge and gauge block manufacturing or calibration, they are typically expressed in millionths of an inch or, alternatively, in micrometres; in nanotechnology, nanometres or picometres are used.

=== Usage notes on mil versus thou ===
In the United States, mil was once the more common term, but as use of the metric system has become more common, thou has replaced mil among most technical users to avoid confusion with millimetres. Today both terms are used, but in specific contexts one is traditionally preferred over the other.

== Equivalents in other units of length ==
1 thou is equal to:

- 0.001 international inches (1 international inch is equal to 1,000 thou)
- 0.0254 mm, or 25.4 μm (1 millimetre is about 39.37 thou)

== History of usage ==
The introduction of the thousandth of an inch as a base unit in engineering and machining is generally attributed to Joseph Whitworth who wrote in 1857:

... instead of our engineers and machinists thinking in eighths, sixteenths and thirty-seconds of an inch, it is desirable that they should think and speak in tenths, hundredths, and thousandths ...

Whitworth's main point was to advocate decimalization in place of fractions based on successive halving; but in mentioning thousandths, he was also broaching the idea of a finer division than had been used previously. Until then, workers such as millwrights, boilermakers, and machinists in the Anglosphere measured only in traditional fractions of an inch, divided via successive halving, usually only as far as 64ths (1, 1/2, 1/4, 1/8, 1/16, 1/32, 1/64). Each 64th is about 16 thou. Communication about sizes smaller than a 64th of an inch was subjective and hampered by a degree of ineffability—while phrases such as "scant 64th" or "heavy 64th" were used, they were imprecise. Dimensions and geometry could be controlled to high accuracy, but this was done by comparative methods: comparison against templates or other gauges, feeling the degree of drag of calipers, or simply repeatably cutting, relying on the positioning consistency of jigs, fixtures, and machine slides. Such work could only be done in craft fashion: on-site, by feel, rather than at a distance working from drawings and written notes. Although measurement was certainly a part of the daily routine, the highest-precision aspects of the work were achieved by feel or by gauge, not by measuring (as in determining counts of units). This in turn limited the kinds of process designs that could work, because they limited the degree of separation of concerns that could occur.

The introduction of the thou as a base unit for machining work required the dissemination of vernier calipers and screw micrometers throughout the trade, as the unit is too small to be measured with practical repeatability using rulers alone. (Most rule markings were far too wide to mark a single mil, and even if such dividing is accomplished, it is unclear to the naked eye, being discernible but not useful for measuring.) During the following half century, such measuring instruments, previously expensive rarities, became widespread, everyday tools among machinists. Bringing more metrology into machining made possible, for example, designing an assembly in the form of an engineering drawing, then having the mating parts made at different firms who did not have any contact with (or even awareness of) each other—yet still being sure that their products would have the desired fit.

== See also ==
- twip, a typographical measurement, defined as 1/1440 inch, or 17.64 μm.
