= Body jewelry sizes =

Wikipedia overview article

Body jewelry sizes express the thickness of an item of body jewelry, using one of several possible systems.

== Background ==
Items of body piercing jewelry have an important common factor: the diameter of the part of the item of jewelry where it will rest in the piercing site. With the wearing of European-traditional kinds of earrings, that thickness is not an issue, because jewelry is made to use only thin wire for support, and the wearer need only have a narrow piercing hole to accommodate it. But with body jewelry, there is a wide variety of possible sizes, and wearers generally want jewelry that is the same size as their piercing site. Some wearers want increasingly larger sizes to deliberately stretch the hole. So that wearers can choose the size they want, there are standards for body jewelry sizes, used by jewelry makers and sellers.

Generally, the system of gauge-and-inches is used: In gauge notation, jewelry less than 1/2 inch (13 mm) thick is typically measured in a system originally devised for measuring wire thickness. A gauge number denotes a thickness on a standardized scale which, for most purposes, starts at 20g (0.812 mm thick— often used for the posts for nose studs), and increases in thickness (as the gauge number decreases) to 0g, then 00g, and rarely goes any further as these thicknesses come closer and closer to 1/2 inch. From there, sizes of 1/2 inch and thicker are always specified in fractions of an inch. (But note that sizes thinner than 1/2 inch are also sometimes specified as fractions of an inch; see the § Conversion table to see how these interleave with gauges.)

Even though the gauge system was originally meant for wire, it is now used regardless of whether an item of body jewelry is an actual wire, or is instead a wooden plug, a plastic ring, or any other material.

The alternative to using the gauge-and-inches system is to specify the thickness in millimeters.

== Conversion table ==
gauge (AWG)	diameter		
gauge (AWG)	inches fractional	inches decimal	millimeters
20	·	0.0320	0.812
18	·	0.0403	1.024
16	·	0.0508	1.291
·	1/16	0.0625	1.588
14	·	0.0641	1.628
12	·	0.0808	2.05
10	·	0.1019	2.58
·	1/8	0.1250	3.18
8	·	0.1285	3.26
6	·	0.1620	4.12
·	3/16	0.1875	4.76
4	·	0.204	5.19
·	1/4	0.250	6.35
2	·	0.258	6.54
·	5/16	0.312	7.94
0	·	0.325	8.25
00	·	0.365	9.27
·	3/8	0.375	9.52
000	·	0.410	10.40
·	7/16	0.438	11.11
0000	·	0.460	11.68
·	1/2	0.500	12.70
·	9/16	0.562	14.29
·	5/8	0.625	15.88
·	11/16	0.688	17.46
·	3/4	0.750	19.05
·	13/16	0.812	20.6
·	7/8	0.875	22.2
·	15/16	0.938	23.8
·	1	1.000	25.4
·	1 1/16	1.062	27.0
·	1 1/8	1.125	28.6
·	1 3/16	1.188	30.2
·	1 1/4	1.250	31.8
·	1 5/16	1.312	33.3
·	1 3/8	1.375	34.9
·	1 7/16	1.438	36.5
·	1 1/2	1.500	38.1
·	1 9/16	1.562	39.7
·	1 5/8	1.625	41.3
·	1 11/16	1.688	42.9
·	1 3/4	1.750	44.4
·	1 13/16	1.812	46.0
·	1 7/8	1.875	47.6
·	1 15/16	1.938	49.2
·	2	2.000	50.8

== Usage of the systems ==
Using millimeters as the primary notation is most common in Europe and Australia.

== Units and notation ==
Discussions of gauge in this article use the American Wire Gauge (AWG) scale. Some jewelry may use the significantly different Standard Wire Gauge (SWG) scale instead, particularly jewelry from Canada or the United Kingdom where the SWG scale is used. Both AWG and SWG express sizes as a gauge, but the numbers are different. For example, AWG 12g is 2.1 mm, but SWG 12g is 2.6 mm. AWG 8g happens to be the same as SWG 10g. AWG 000g is 10.4 mm, but SWG 000g is 9.4 mm.

In most discussions of body jewelry, sizes are specified by giving the gauge, usually abbreviated by the suffix "g", the same symbol as used for grams: "12g". The article American Wire Gauge system, section "Nomenclature and abbreviations in electrical distribution" shows other notations for gauge, but most are rarely used for expressing body jewelry sizes, except "ga." as in "12 ga.", which is used occasionally.

== See also ==
- Jewelry wire gauge
