= Number 8 wire =

Culturally significant wire gauge

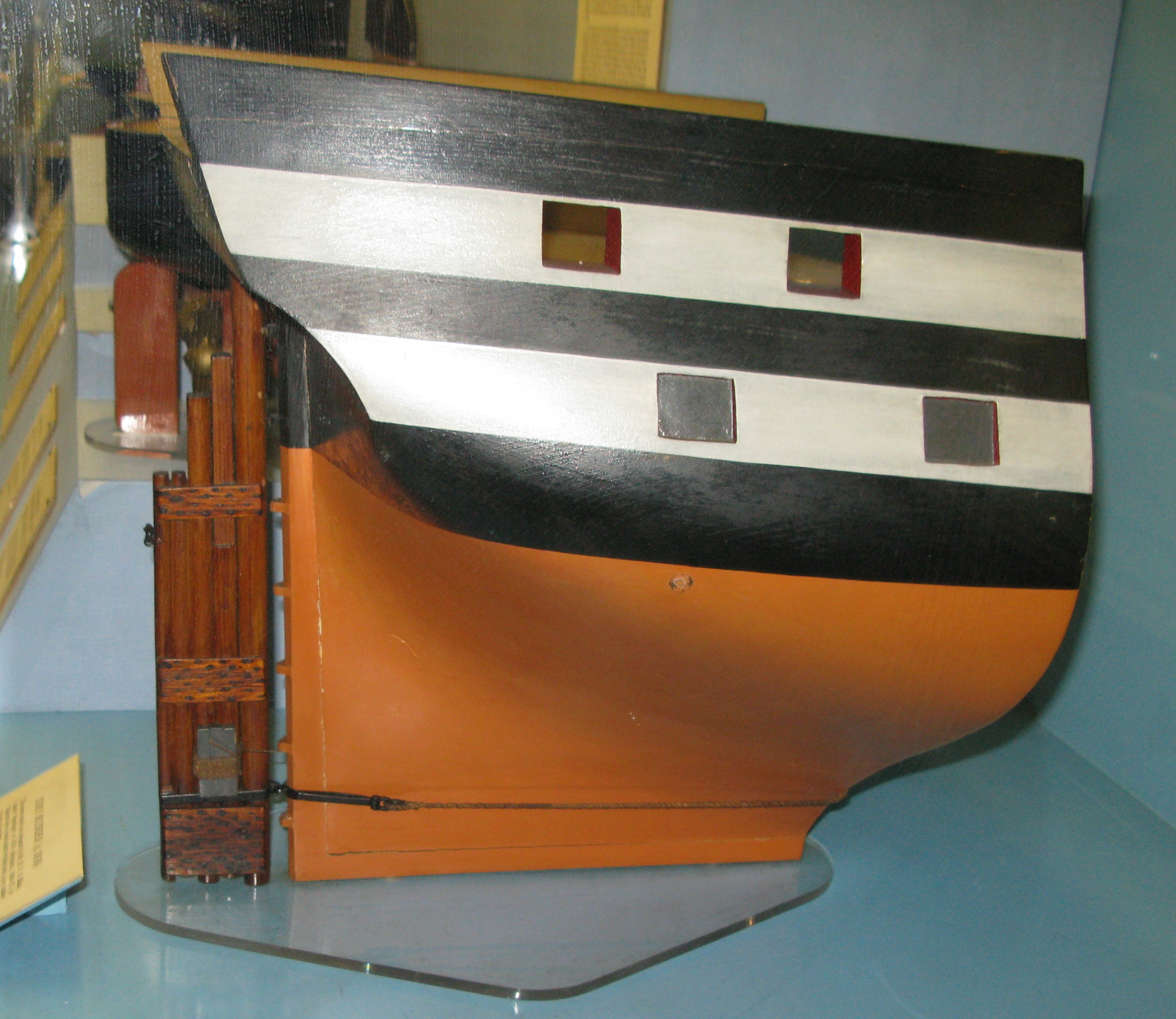
A model showing a method for jury-rigging a rudder, an example of Number 8 wire mentality

Number 8 wire is a 0.16-inch-diameter (4.064 mm) gauge of wire on the British Standard Wire Gauge that has entered into the cultural lexicon of New Zealand.

== Use for farm fencing ==
Early farm fences in New Zealand were generally used to protect crops, gardens, and orchards from farm animals, rather than to contain the stock. Fencing methods used were post-and-rail fences, ditch-and-bank fences, stone walls, and hedges, but all proved too expensive to install and maintain to fence entire properties and tended to be unreliable. To prevent stock straying, boundary keepers were employed to patrol boundaries. In the 1850s, heavy annealed iron wire became available for fences, but this wire was very thick and only came in short lengths, was hard to work and to keep taut, and was expensive to use. In England, in 1855, Henry Bessemer patented the Bessemer process that led to the mass production of low-cost high-quality steel, leading to the large scale production of affordable lighter gauge steel wire.

The introduction of the new steel fencing wire of various gauges in the 1860s allowed the rapid construction of low-cost fencing and was quickly adopted for use on New Zealand sheep farms. Galvanised number 8 steel wire soon became the preferred standard. These new, lightweight steel wire fences were not suitable for cattle, as cattle would lean over or on the fences and damage or push the fences over. When barbed wire became available in 1879, it was used as the top wire and perhaps a lower additional wire in conjunction with No. 8 wire on fences on dairy and cattle farms to prevent the animals from damaging the fences. This further extended the use of number 8 wire.

From the early 1960s, high-tensile 12½ gauge (2.5 mm) steel wire has largely replaced number 8 wire for New Zealand fencing, as it is lighter and cheaper, though also more difficult to work. Since 1976, when New Zealand adopted the metric system, number 8 wire is officially referred to as 4.0 mm gauge wire, although the older term "Number 8 wire" continues to be commonly used.

== In language and culture ==
As a consequence of the ubiquitous use of number 8 wire in New Zealand, remote farms often had rolls of number 8 wire on hand, and the wire would often be used inventively and practically to solve mechanical or structural problems other than fencing. Accordingly, the term "number 8 wire" came to represent the ingenuity and resourcefulness of New Zealanders, and the phrase "a number 8 wire mentality" evolved to denote an ability to create or repair machinery using whatever scrap materials are available on hand. New Zealand hardware and DIY store franchise Mitre 10 have adopted "Number 8" as their in house brand for generic hardware supplies and tools.

The Waikato Museum runs an art award focused around and named after the wire.

== See also ==
- Culture of New Zealand
- Agriculture in New Zealand
- MacGyverism — a similar concept describing the resourceful use of materials to hand.
- Baling wire
- Duct tape — often used in a similar improvised way.
- Fence
- Fred Dagg
- Yankee ingenuity
- Jugaad
- WD-40
