= Draw plate =

Die used to reduce the gauge of wire

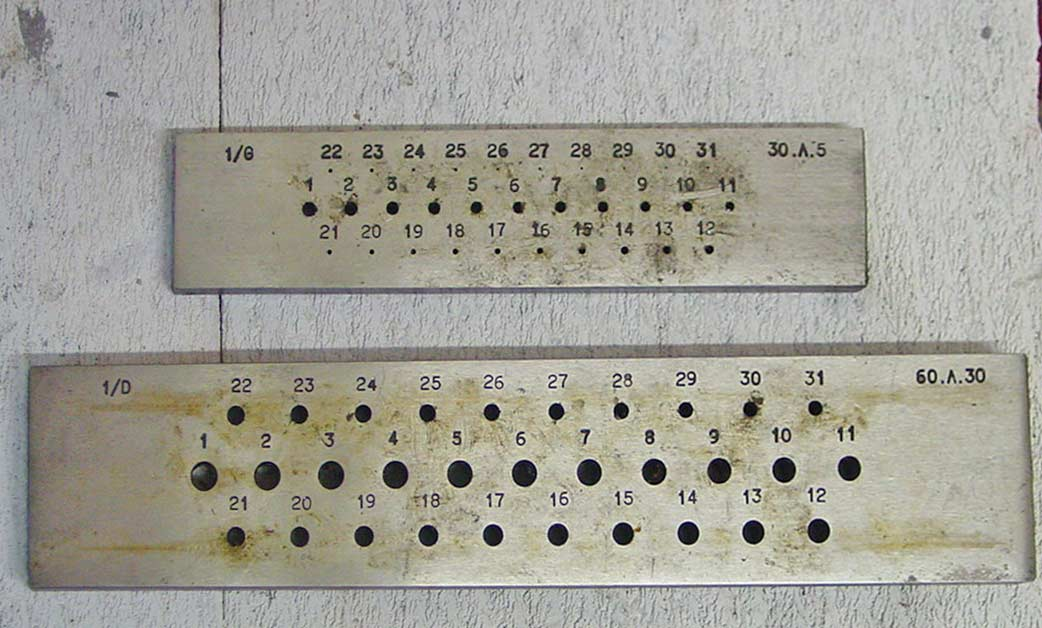
Two drawplates for different wire gauges

A draw plate is a type of die consisting of a hardened steel plate with one or more tapered holes through which wire is drawn to make it thinner. A typical plate will have twenty to thirty holes, so a wide range of diameters can be drawn.

== Drawing wire ==
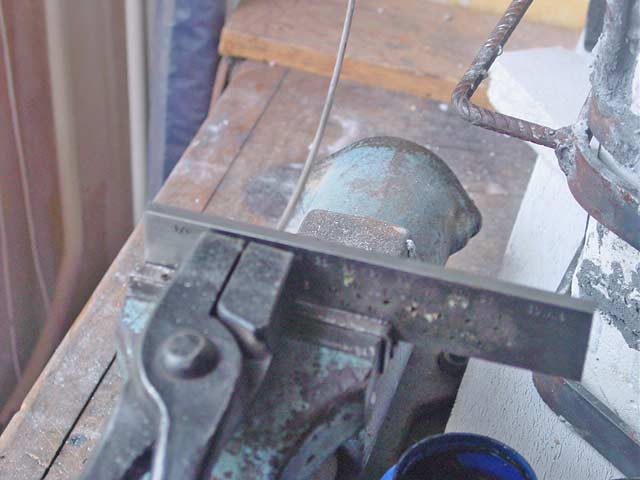
Tongs at the bottom of the photo will be used to pull silver wire through the draw plate

Before drawing, the draw plate is held securely in a vise or other fixture. The plate is oriented so that the wider end of a tapered opening can receive a metal wire which is to be pulled through it.

Annealed soft, ductile wire is filed at one end to give it an initial taper. The tapered end is inserted into a tapered hole with a final diameter just smaller than its current width. Special pliers, called draw tongs are used to hold the tip of the wire and pull it through, sometimes with the aid of grease or wax as a lubricant. Small-diameter wire may be drawn manually, while very thick wire may require a drawing bench with a crank to produce enough force.

Typically, a wire can be drawn three times in sequence before it needs to be re-annealed. This must be done because drawing wire hardens it, which causes the wire to become brittle. Brittle wire that has not been annealed may snap during the drawing process (or develop microscopic or macroscopic cracks, which may weaken the piece or "grow" with further working).

With a mandrel, a draw plate can be used to draw tubes of metal. Plates are available in many different sizes and shapes for drawing different shapes of wire, including round, square, oval, half-round, and hexagonal.

== History ==
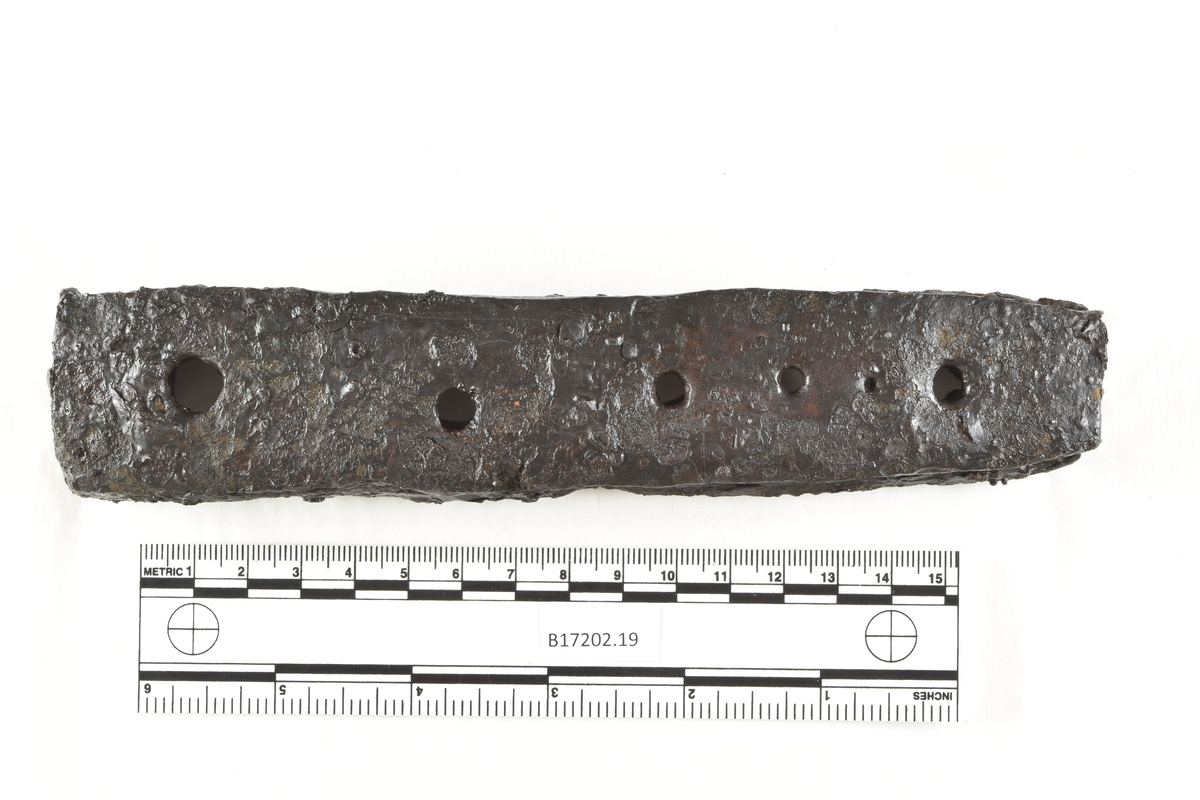
Late eighth-century drawplate from Bergen

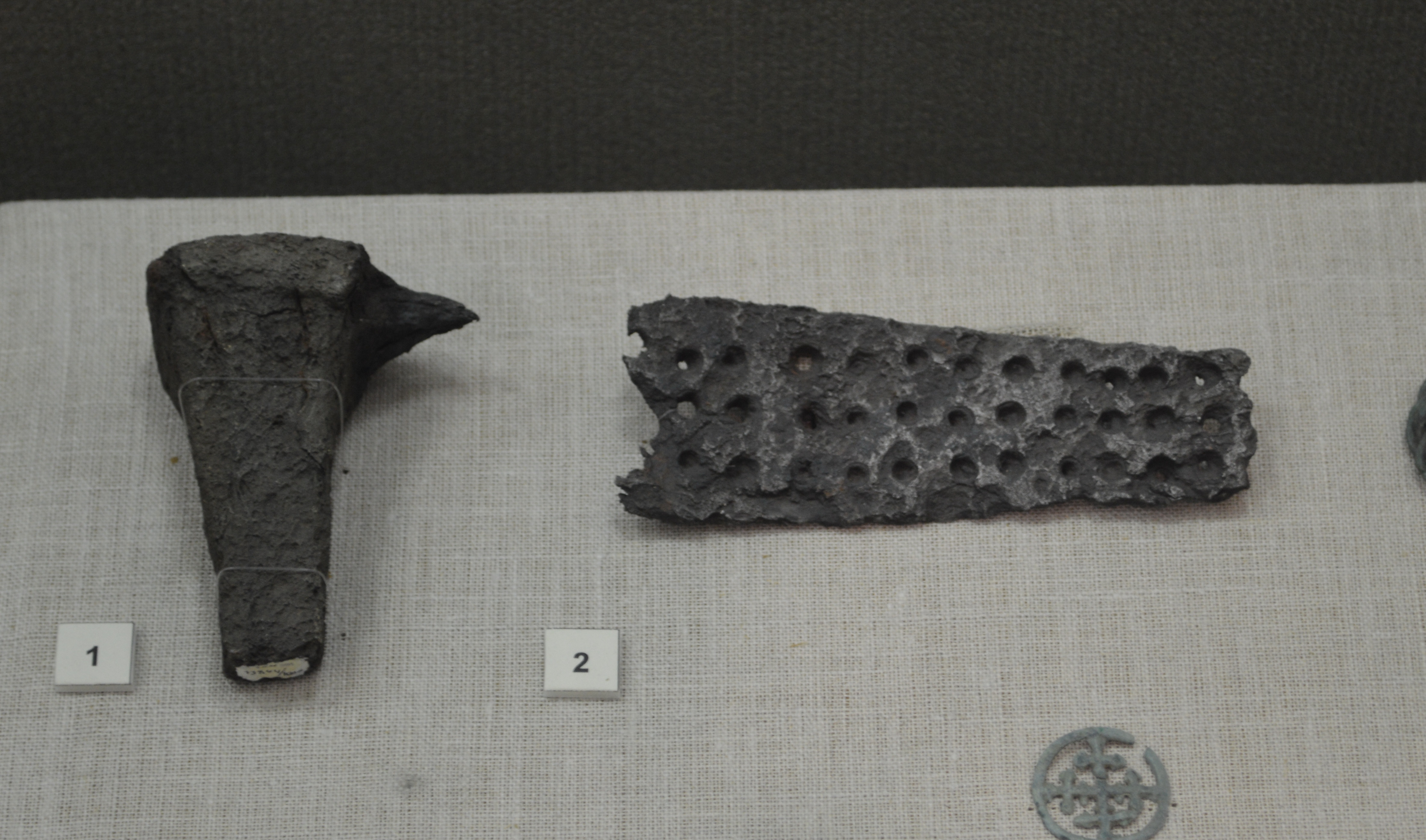
Anvil and drawplate for jewelry making, Kyivan Rus', 12th-14th centuries.

The origins of wire-drawing are uncertain. One of the earliest known written references to wire-making is Exodus 39:3, which suggests that gold was hammered into sheets, cut into strips, and then these strips were made into gold wire, but the precise technique is not clear. The oldest clear written descriptions of the method are the twelfth-century De diversis artibus by Theophilus Presbyter and the sixteenth-century De la pirotechnia by Vannoccio Biringuccio. As of 2023, the earliest known draw plates dated to around the sixth century. As of 2026, the earliest known draw plates dated to Roman times.

== See also ==
- Tube drawing
- Cold working
- Die (manufacturing)
