= Ordnance Depot =

Ordnance Depot may refer to:

- Black Hills Ordnance Depot
- Erie Ordnance Depot
- Holabird Ordnance Depot
- Navajo Ordnance Depot, at Bellemont, Arizona (noe Camp Navajo)
- Ogden Ordnance Depot, near Ogden, Utah (now Defense Depot Ogden)
- Pueblo Ordnance Depot, east of Pueblo, Colorado (now Pueblo Chemical Depot)
- Shumaker Naval Ammunition Depot
- Stockton Ordnance Depot
- Terre Haute Ordnance Depot
- Umatilla Ordnance Depot
