= List of the United States Army munitions by supply catalog designation =

The Ammunition Identification Code (AIC) was a sub-set of the Standard Nomenclature List (SNL). The SNL was an inventory system used from 1928 to 1958 to catalog all the items the Army's Ordnance Corps issued.

The AIC was used by the United States Army Ordnance Corps from January, 1942 to 1958. It listed munitions and explosives (items from SNLs P, R, S, and T), items that were considered priority issue for soldiers in combat. The markings used by the system made it easier for soldiers to quickly identify and procure the right items.

It used a code that had five parts.

1. The first character consisted of the item's SNL Group and was represented by its letter.
2. The second character indicated the sub-group and was represented by its number.
3. The third character represented the weapon or weapons that could use it and was represented by a letter.
4. The fourth character represented the type and model of ammunition (i.e., Training Blank, Ball, Armor-Piercing, Incendiary, Tracer, etc.), which differed from weapon to weapon, and was represented by a letter.
5. The fifth and last character detailed the packing method (Cartons, Bandoleers, or Belts / Links) and container type used (M1917 Rifle Ammunition Packing Box, M23 Ammo Crate, etc.) and was designated by a letter.

The AIC was replaced by the FSN (Federal Stock Number) in 1958, which later became the NSN (National Stock Number) in 1975.

== Packing terminology ==
=== Cartons ===
Ammunition came packed in single-ply chipboard cartons lined with Manila paper. A label marked with the number of cartridges, caliber and type of ammo, manufacturer, and Lot Code was glued over the top flap, front, and back to seal the carton. Wartime boxes (1942 to 1945) had wide vertical colored stripes, like those used on the packing box, as a background for the text. This allowed the soldier to quickly visually identify the ammo he needed.

==== .45 ACP ====
.45 ACP ammo for the Colt M1911 semi-automatic pistol and Thompson submachine gun originally came in 20-round boxes. It was later changed to 50-round boxes in 1942 for ease of packing and distribution. They were packed in the small M1911 Pistol Ammunition Packing Boxes.

.45 ACP ammo for the Colt M1917 and Smith & Wesson M1917 revolvers came packed in 3-round Half-Moon clips. They were packed eight clips per carton in two-row (2x12 cell – sideways interlocking "zig-zag" style) or three-row (3x9 cell – inline overlapping "spoons" style) rectangular cartons of 24 rounds. They were packed in the larger M1917 Rifle / Machinegun Ammunition Packing Boxes.

==== .30 carbine ====
M1 carbine ammo was originally packed in 3-row 45-round boxes to reduce waste, as the carbine had a 15-round magazine. This was later changed in 1942 to 50-round boxes to ship as much ammo as possible. They were packed in a special small Ammunition Packing Box, perhaps so a soldier wouldn't grab the wrong ammunition.

==== .30 caliber ====
.30 caliber rifle (grade "R") and machine gun (grade "MG") ammo came in 20-round boxes. Early-war cartons for use in bolt-action rifles like the Springfield M1903 came with the ammo already in 5-round stripper clips. They were packed in the large M1917 ammunition packing boxes.

==== .50 caliber ====
.50 caliber machine gun ammo (grades "AC" and "MG") came bulk-packed in 10-round boxes for loading into belts or links in-theater. They were packed in the large M1917 ammunition packing boxes.

=== Ammunition packing box ===
A wooden box designed to be reused. The lid was secured by tightening brass wingnuts over threaded metal posts in the walls of the chest. They were meant to be carried by means of handles milled into the ends of the chest; troops assigned to carry ammo found them hard to grasp. Ammunition was shipped in boxes with a hermetically-sealed terneplate lining that had the top soldered on to seal it; this was ripped open using a wire handle built into the top. It came in two standard sizes.

The small M1917 packing box (Dimensions: 16-7/16" Length × 12-11/16" Width × 7-5/8" Height; Volume: 0.92 cubic feet) was secured with 4 threaded posts (one on each side). It was used for pistol and submachine gun ammunition and held 2,000 rounds in cartons (100 x 20-round cartons or 40 x 50-round cartons). It could also be used to hold 960 rounds of Caliber .30 ammo (48 x 20-round cartons) or 240 rounds of Caliber .50 (24 x 10-round cartons) ammo.
Another box (Volume: 0.83 cubic feet) was used for carbine ammunition. It held 2,700 (60 x 45-round cartons) or 3,000 (60 x 50-round cartons) cartridges.

The large M1917 packing box (Dimensions: 18-7/16" Length × 9-7/16" Width × 14-13/16" Height; Tare Weight: 9 lbs. Volume: 1.49 cubic feet) was secured with 6 threaded posts (one on each end and two on each side). It was used to store and carry .30- and .50-caliber ammunition in cartons, clips, belts or links.

Pre-war and early-war ammo packing boxes were made of stained wood with black-painted lettering. Mid- to late-war packing boxes were painted Olive Drab brown with white or yellow lettering that used the item's AIC code and a system of symbols to indicate the contents at a glance. The caliber, ammunition type and model (e.g., Caliber .30 Ball M1) were in the upper center field in bold lettering. The number of units (i.e., how many bullets or shells there were per box) and packing information (i.e., whether it was in cartons, bandoleers or belts) were on the two lines below it. The caliber (CAL .45, CAL .30, or CAL .50) was painted in bold lettering in the upper left corner. The gross weight of the box in pounds and its volume in cubic feet was painted in the lower left corner and the Ammunition Lot information (manufacturer code and lot number) was painted in the lower right corner.

==== Packing box stripes ====
In 1943(?), a system was introduced that painted color-coded stripes painted across the long sides and lid to indicate the contents.
A straight stripe indicated Pistol, Carbine, Rifle and Medium Machine gun ammunition; it was vertical on the long sides and top and horizontal on the ends. Triple straight stripes were painted horizontally with the first stripe on top or to the left and the third stripe on the bottom or to the right.
A diagonal stripe (lower left corner to upper right corner) indicated Heavy Machine gun ammunition. Triple diagonal stripes were painted with the first stripe on the left-side and the third stripe on the right side. If packed in cartons, the colored stripe was duplicated on the carton's label vertically.

Red = Ball.
Brown = Gallery practice. (.22 Long Rifle and .30 Gallery M1919)
Orange = Guard. (.30 Guard M1)
Orange with wide Green stripe = Dim Tracer (1600 yards range) or Subdued Tracer (50 to 140 yards before ignition / 1,000 yards range).
Yellow = High Pressure Test
Yellow with wide Red stripe = Incendiary.
Yellow with wide Red stripe inset with narrow Green stripe = Incendiary Tracer.
Yellow with wide Green stripe = Bright Tracer (3,000 yards range).
Yellow with wide Blue stripe = Armor-Piercing.
Yellow with wide Blue stripe inset with narrow Red stripe = Armor-Piercing Incendiary.
Yellow with wide Blue stripe inset with narrow Green stripe = Armor-Piercing Tracer.
Green = Dummy.
Blue = Blank.
Blue with wide White stripe = Rifle Grenade Blank.
Triple Red, Yellow, and Green Stripe = Linked Ball & Tracer.
Triple Yellow, Red, and Green Stripe = Belted Ball & Tracer.
Triple Yellow, Blue, and Red Stripe = Belted Armor-Piercing & Incendiary.
Triple Yellow, Blue, and Green Stripe = Belted Armor-Piercing & Tracer.
Triple Blue, Yellow, and Red Stripe = Linked Armor-Piercing & Incendiary.
Triple Blue, Yellow, and Green Stripe = Linked Armor-Piercing & Tracer.

=== Commercial shotgun shell packing box ===
A wooden or fiberboard box with a waterproof tarpaper lining designed to transport and carry shotgun shells. It held 20 × 25-shell cartons (500 total shells) of 12 gauge ammunition and weighed around 65 lbs (Dimensions: 15" Length × 10.375" Width × 9.75" Height; Volume: 0.88 Cubic Feet).
Guard shells had either a brass base (base only) with a full paper hull or partial brass case (1" long) and a long paper hull.
Combat shells had either a partial brass case (1" long) with a long paper hull or a full (2.75" long) brass case and no paper hull.
Sporting shells (used for trap shooting or hunting) either had a brass base with a full paper hull or a partial brass case (1/2" long) and a long paper hull.

=== Ammunition crate ===
A metal-strapped wooden packing crate designed to be thrown away that replaced the Ammunition Packing Box. They were made of plain, unpainted wood and had its lettering, AIC code, and symbols stamped on in black ink. They were carried by a horizontal rectangular wooden bar fastened to the pair of vertical wooden reinforcing struts on each end. Some crate contractors looped a semi-circular piece of thick rope through a hole in each reinforcing strut for use as a flexible handle. Other contractors used a folding two-strut metal handle fastened between the reinforcing struts for heavier loads.

The cartons of ammunition inside were originally grouped and packed in corrugated cardboard boxes. The boxes were then coated and sealed in a waterproof wax coating to keep the ammunition inside from being affected by the environment. There were 2 boxes per crate and they were loaded in the crate sideways so the bullets would fly off to the sides rather than through the top or bottom. The weatherproofing was found to be ineffective, so the cardboard boxes were replaced by hermetically-sealed ammunition cans ("spam cans") in the autumn of 1943.

=== Ammunition can ===
A vacuum-sealed metal canister with wire handles on its sides. They were first produced at the Evansville, Indiana Chrysler-Sunbeam plant in 1943 to pack .45 ACP ammunition in M5 cans. It was opened using a metal can key (like a can of sardines) that was soldered to the top. It could be reclosed afterwards using a small roll of duct tape that came packed in the can. They were painted Olive Drab and had yellow lettering on them. The caliber of ammunition – .45 (.45 pistol or submachinegun - cartons), .30C (.30 Carbine – cartons), .30R (.30 Rifle – clips or cartons), .30M (.30 Machinegun – belted or linked ammo), or .50 (Machinegun - linked or cartons) – was embossed in raised letters and numbers on the metal lid so they could be identified by touch under low-light conditions.

The "spam can" designs were created by American Can Company in New York City, New York. It was patented in 1950 (patent number 2,495,715). However, the application was filed on November 28, 1944, not much time after the first cartridges were repacked at the Evansville Chrysler plant.

The model of can (M5, M6, M8, M10, M13, etc.) was embossed on the bottom. The M5 cans were for packing .45 ACP ammo and weighed about 29 lbs. The M6 cans were for packing .30 Carbine ammo and weighed about 25 lbs. The M8 cans were for packing .30 Rifle & Machine gun ammo and weighed about 16 lbs. The M10 cans were originally for packing .50 Machinegun ammo but later on were also used to pack shotgun shells or a variety of other ammunition in cartons.

The M13 can was for issue with a rifle grenade launcher.
The "A" assortment can (weight: 12 oz.) was packed with an assortment of a packet of six .30 Carbine M6 rifle-grenade blanks, a packet of ten .30-'06 Springfield M3 rifle-grenade blanks, and a packet of five M7 booster charges. This "all in one" assortment was the last surviving version in the 1974 Identification Listings.
The "B" assortment can (weight: 10 oz.) contained 1 packet of .30 Carbine M6 rifle-grenade blanks and 1 packet of .30-'06 Springfield M3 rifle-grenade blanks.
The "C" assortment can (weight: 14 oz.) contained 1 packet of .30 Carbine M6 rifle-grenade blanks, 1 packet of .30-'06 Springfield M3 rifle-grenade blanks, and 2 packets of M7 booster charges.
When the M1 and M2 Carbines were withdrawn in the 1960s, the .30 Carbine M6 Grenade Blanks were pulled from repacked M13 cans. The entire contents of the can were replaced by fifteen .30-'06 M3 Grenade Blanks in a heat-sealed plastic bag. The packets of M7 booster charges started to be withdrawn in the 1970s(?) when the M1 Garand started to be replaced by the M16 rifle in the National Guard.

The instruction "Do Not Use As Food Container" was prominently painted on the cans. The lead and chemical residue inside the container could contaminate the food and poison the soldier.

The Korean War–era universal M20 and M21 cans replaced the earlier assortment of cartridge-specific cans. The M20 was a rounded-edged cube with a folding handle on top and was packed two per M22 crate. It was used to pack small arms ammunition in cartons or bandoleers. The M21, twice the height of the M20, was a taller version of the M20 and was packed horizontally two per M23 crate. It was designed to pack linked machinegun and autocannon ammunition. They lacked the embossing of the earlier cans.

==== Mixed lots ====
Mixed lots are when two or three types of new ammunition were used (e.g., Ball and Tracer or Armor-Piercing and Incendiary), like in a machinegun or autocannon belt. They would be pre-loaded into a web belt or disintegrating metal link. The paperwork would mark the new lot number and list the different types and lot numbers of all ammunition used. Packaging would list the lot of each type of ammunition used on the lower right field of the crate, beginning with the line of text "AMMUNITION LOT". Belted ammunition would have a "B" prefix and linked ammunition would have an "L" prefix.

==== Repacked ammo cans ====
Lots made up of old or damaged ammunition were from the same lot. They would be inspected, overhauled, sorted and repacked for re-use. Repacked ammunition was usually resealed in an unpainted ammo can with the information stamped on the container in black ink. The arsenal or manufacturer who did the repacking would use their manufacturer's code followed by the last two digits of the year it was repacked. The paperwork would list the original lot code and new lot code to help in tracing defective or unsuitable ammunition. The repacked crate would have a line of text beginning with "REPACKED LOT:" followed by the new lot code. In 1952 this text was replaced with "FUNCTIONAL LOT:", as troops had been leery of using "used" ammunition. If the lot was being repacked by the same manufacturer, the lot code would be the same, but it would have underneath it the text: "REPACKED" followed by the manufacturer code and the digits of the month and year (e.g., TW-01-44 was repacked by Twin Cities Arsenal in January 1944).

=== Standard ammunition box ===
A re-closeable metal box with a hinged metal lid sealed with a foam-rubber gasket to keep out moisture and rain and a folding metal handle to aid in carrying it. They were originally designed to only store belted machine gun ammunition, but later became a standard container after the war for all sorts of ammunition packed in cartons and / or clips and bandoleers. Originally planned to be disposable, they were recycled for reloading.

The ammo boxes were originally painted Olive Drab Brown (OD3) with white lettering, but were later painted Olive Drab Green (OD7) with yellow lettering. The early individual M1 and M2 series metal boxes were also painted with the same colored ammunition identification stripes as the pre-war and early-war M1917 wooden packing crates.

They were first shipped individually, but were later bulk-packed in unpainted wire-bound plywood crates with stencil-painted or ink-stamped lettering. The .30 M1 and M1A1 ammo boxes were packed four to a crate that weighed around 90 pounds and had a volume of 1 cubic foot. The M1 ammo crate held a total of 1,000 belted or linked rounds packed in 4 M1 ammo boxes and the later M1A1 ammo crate held a total of 1,000 belted or 1,100 linked rounds packed in M1A1 ammo boxes. There were two .50 M2 ammo boxes to a crate (for a total of 220 belted or 210 linked rounds) with a volume of 0.93 cubic feet. The later M2A1 can also came packed two to a crate (for a total of 200 linked rounds) with a volume of 0.85 cubic feet.

- The M1 box (made from 1942 to 1945 and phased out by the 1950s) opened from the side, had a flat bottom, had a catch opposite from the box's hinge for attaching the can to the M1917 / M1917A1 / M1918 / M1928 tripod, and had a pair of concentric oval ribs on the long sides to reinforce them. Inside the rings was embossed two lines of text: "CAL .30M" / "AMMUNITION BOX"; with the "M" standing for Machine gun ammunition. The initials "U.S." and the US Army Ordnance Corps' "Flaming Bomb" symbol were embossed on the hinge side. It held 250 belted rounds of .30-caliber ammo and was designed to replace the similar but less durable M1917 wooden machine gun ammo boxes. (Dimensions: 10-3/16" Length × 3-3/4" Width × 7-7/32" Height; Weight (empty): around 3.5 lbs.; Net Weight (250-round M1 cloth belt): 15.5 lbs; Gross Weight (loaded): 19 lbs.; Volume: 0.1595 Cubic Feet).
  The M1A1 Box that replaced it (June 1945 – 1950s and phased out in the early 1960s) was a little taller (11" Length × 3-13/16" Width × 7-19/32" Height), had a more durable rubber gasket, and held 250 belted or 275 linked rounds of .30-06 ammo. The M1A1 model can be distinguished from the earlier M1 by the different embossed text, which reads "CAL .30 M1" / "AMMUNITION BOX" in the oval; the "M" now stood for Model. Later cans were embossed with "CAL .30 M1A1" / "M.M.G. BOX". There were also some minor improvements. The tripod catch side was redesigned to be slightly angled at the bottom and top rather than flat to fit flush alongside the tripod mount.
- The later M19 Box (1946 to 1953) that replaced the M1 series was a product-improved model that eliminated the earlier model's weaknesses and added improvements. It retained the rubber gasket, eliminated the tripod catch, and had smooth sides. The major difference between the M19 and the M1 series are the M19 series' lid skirts, which made the M19 series visually distinctive from the M1 and M2 series. They are designed to lock in place while part-way open to protect the belted ammunition inside from the elements while it feeds into the weapon. The M19 box held 250 belted or linked rounds of .30-06 ammunition.
  The M19A1 box (1954 to present) held the shorter, thicker 7.62mm NATO service cartridge, which replaced the .30-06 Springfield in 1954. It incorporated a series of improvements that corrected faults discovered during the Korean War. The lid was redesigned and the gasket was adjusted to allow it to close properly and remain sealed in cold weather – as the contracting metal would either stick shut or make it impossible to close once opened. An overhang was added to the lid and the latch was made wider to make it easier for soldiers with gloved hands to open it. It had a hollow on the bottom that was high enough to fit over the folding handle on the top of the box beneath it, allowing the boxes to be neatly stacked on top of each other. For ease in loading, a cartridge shape was embossed in the edge of the lid and center of the base to show which way the belt it contained faced (a feature that was later discontinued). It can hold 220 linked or 225 belted 7.62mm NATO rounds in bulk or 2 × 100-round linked belts packed in cartons and carried in bandoleers. The M19A1 box is also used to store pistol ammunition in cartons. (Dimensions: 3 13/16" [96.8mm] Width × 7 1/4" [184.2mm] Height × 11" [279.4mm] Long. Weight: 3.81 lbs. (1.72 kg.) Volume: 0.175 Cubic Feet)
- The M2 box (September 1942 – 1950) had 4 rectangular "feet" embossed into the bottom of the box that ran along the edges of the sides, square ribbing around the edges of each side, a foam-rubber gasket, and opened from the front like a tool box. It had a small folding wire handle on the left side corner to secure it to a tripod. On the front side the bottom arc of the ribbing running along the bottom edge was embossed: "AMMO BOX CAL .50 M2". The back side was usually where the content information was stenciled because there was more empty space. It held 110 belted or 105 linked rounds of .50-caliber ammo. (Dimensions: 12 ¼" Length × 6 ¼" Width × 7 ½" Height; Weight (empty): 4.4 lbs.; Gross Weight: 35 lbs.; Volume: 0.33 Cubic Feet).
  The M2A1 Box (1950–2004) opens from the side (but lacks the tripod catch of the similar M1 series), has smooth sides and a rubber gasket, had a hollow bottom like the M19 box, and holds a standardized 100 linked rounds. The M2A1 box was commonly used to store a variety of ammo in cartons, clips, and bandoleers. It was replaced in 2004 by the improved M2A2 Box, which had a reinforced lid hinge and a support bar riveted to the top of the latch to keep pressure from compromising the rubber gasket and crushing the lid. (Dimensions: 12 1/32" Length × 6 3/32" Width × 7 ½" Height; Weight (empty): ?? lbs.; Volume: 0.32 Cubic Feet).
- The 20mm Ammunition Box Mk.1 Mod.0 (1942-1970s?) was a steel chest used by the Navy that was originally designed to carry 20mm shells. It had a removable lid with a gasket seal, two large hasps on each side and a hasp on each end, and was painted gray with black markings. It was made of metal rather than wood because wooden crates were a fire hazard and would get damaged from rough handling. Since it was the same size as the wooden M1917 chest, it was used to store small arms ammunition from the elements. From about 1943 it was used to hold six M5, M6, M8, or M10 spam cans (3 per horizontal cardboard carton) to replace the wooden crates. In the 1950s it could hold 6 x M20 ammo cans (3 per horizontal cardboard carton with spacers) or 3 x M21 ammo cans (3 per vertical cardboard carton with spacers). The former stored small arms ammunition in cartons or bandoleers while the latter was usually used to hold linked caliber .50 and 20 mm ammo.

== Group "P" Material (Ammunition for Heavy Field Artillery and Anti-Aircraft Weapons) ==
The Green Bag Charge (in a green cloth bag) was a short range powder charge in increments from 1 to 5. The White Bag Charge (in a white cloth bag) was the long range powder charge in increments 7 through 12? The gunners would rip off the unneeded sections of the bag charge and load the remainder in the gun.

=== Sub-group P1 (Projectiles, separate loading, 6-inch to 240-mm inclusive) ===
Class P1ZA (Ammunition for 155mm Guns M1 and M1A1)

Uses Powder Charge P2EAA

P1ZAM = 1 × 155mm HE M101 Projectile with Point Detonating Fuse M51A1
P1ZAN = 1 × 155mm Casualty Gas(H) Projectile with Point Detonating Fuse M51A1
P1ZAO = 1 × 155mm Smoke(WP) Projectile with Point Detonating Fuse M51A1
P1ZAP = 1 × 155mm AP M113 Projectile with Base Detonating Fuse (M48?)
P1ZCM = 1 × 155mm HE M101 Projectile with Mechanical Time Fuse (M57?)

Class P1ZB (Ammunition for 155mm Guns M1917, M1917A1 and M1918M1)

Uses Powder Charge P2FCC

P1ZBC = 1 × 155mm HE M101 Projectile with Point Detonating Fuse M51A1
P1ZBD = 1 × 155mm Casualty Gas(H) Projectile with Point Detonating Fuse M51A1
P1ZBE = 1 × 155mm Smoke(WP) Projectile with Point Detonating Fuse M51A1
P1ZBG = 1 × 155mm AP M113 Projectile with Base Detonating Fuse (M48?)
P1ZCN = 1 × 155mm HE M101 Projectile with Mechanical Time Fuse (M57?)

Class P1ZC (Ammunition for 8" (203mm) Howitzer, M1)
P1ZCD = 1 × 8" HE M106 Projectile with Point Detonating Fuse M51A1 and Green Bag Charge
P1ZCE = 1 × 8" HE M106 Projectile with Point Detonating Fuse M51A1 and White Bag Charge
P1ZCF = 1 × 8" HE M106 Projectile with Point Detonating Fuse M57 and Green Bag Charge
P1ZCG = 1 × 8" HE M106 Projectile with Point Detonating Fuse M57 and White Bag Charge

=== Sub-group P2 (Charges, propelling, separate loading, 6-inch (152-mm) to 240-mm inclusive for harbor defense, heavy field, and railway artillery.) ===
P2EEA – Powder Charge for 155mm Guns M1 and M1A1
P2FCC – Powder Charge for 155mm Guns M1917, M1917A1 and M1918M1
P2OBE - 2 × Propelling Charge [White Bag] for 8mm Howitzer M1 in a wooden crate. Gross Weight: 109 lbs., Volume: 3.96 Cu. Ft.

=== Sub-group P5 (Anti-Aircraft Weapons) ===
Class P5EA (Ammunition for 37-mm Anti-Aircraft Gun M1A2 and A/N M2)
P5EAB = 10 × 37 mm HE-Tracer M54 Shell, with Point Detonating Fuse M56 in wooden crate.
P5EAC = 10 × 37 mm HE M54 Shell in wooden crate. Weight: ? Volume: 0.85 Cubic Feet.
P5EIA = ? × 37 mm AP Capped-Tracer M39 Shot in wooden crate.

Class P5F (Ammunition for 40-mm Automatic Gun M1 and Quick-Firing Gun (Bofors))
P5FHA 24 × 40 mm HE-Tracer MK.2 Shell in wooden crate.

Class P5H (Ammunition for 40-mm Anti-Aircraft Gun M1 (Bofors Gun - British))

The 40mm Bofors Gun used 4-round clips and was loaded manually.

P5HJA = 24 × 40 mm AP-Tracer M81A1 Shot [without Clips] in wooden crate
P5HNA = 24 × 40 mm HE-Tracer MK.2 Shell (w/. Self-Destruct MK.12) with Point-Detonating Fuse MK.27 (Navy) [without Clips] in wooden crate
P5HOA = 24 × 40 mm HE-Tracer MK.2 Shell (w/. Self-Destruct) with Point-Detonating Fuse MK.27 (Navy) [without Clips] in wooden crate.
P5HVA = 6 × 40 mm HE-Tracer MK.2 Shell (w/. Self-Destruct tracer MK.11) with Point-Detonating Fuse MK.27 (Navy) [without Clips] in wooden crate. Gross Weight: 52 lbs. Volume: 1.0 Cubic Foot.

Class P5M (Ammunition for 3-inch anti-aircraft gun 3" (76.2mm) M1917, M1925, M1, M2, and M4)
P5MSB 2 × 3" HE M42A1 with Mechanical Time Fuse M43A5 in wooden crate. Gross Weight: 50.7 lbs. Volume: 2.28 Cu. Ft.

Class P5N (Ammunition for 3" (76.2mm) Anti-Aircraft Guns (Mobile))
P5NIA = ? × 3" AP Capped-Tracer M62 Shot with Base-Detonating Fuze M66A1 in wooden crate.
P5NSA = ? × 3" HE M42A1 Shell with Mechanical Time Fuze M43 in wooden crate.
P6OCA = ? × 3" HE M42A1 Shell with Point-Detonating Fuze M48 in wooden crate.
P6ODA = ? × 3" HE M42A1 Shell with Point-Detonating Fuze M48A1 in wooden crate.

== Group "R" Material (Ammunition for pack, light, and medium field artillery) ==
The "T" (or "Trial") designation was for experimental munitions before they went into standard production. They are placed in parentheses after the standard designation.

=== Sub-group R1 (Ammunition, fixed and semi-fixed, all types – including subcaliber – for pack, light, and medium field artillery, including complete round data) ===
==== Class R1A (20x110mm Hispano "A"; Ammunition for 20 mm Guns M1, A/N M2, M3, and British Hispano-Suiza "A") ====
R1ABA = 120 rounds × 20 mm High-Explosive-Incendiary Mk.I Cartridge with Point-Detonating Fuze No.253 Mk.I. 10 rounds per moisture-sealed fiberboard container, 12 containers per wooden packing crate. Net Weight = ? lbs. Gross Weight = ? lbs. Volume = 1.45 cubic feet.
R1ABS = 120 rounds × 20 mm High-Explosive-Incendiary Mk.I Cartridge (Tetryl filler, Steel Case). 10 rounds per moisture-sealed fiberboard container, 12 containers per wooden packing crate. Gross Weight = 95 lbs. Volume = 1.45 cubic feet.
R1ACA = 120 rounds of 20 mm Armor-Piercing-Tracer M75 Cartridge. 10 rounds per moisture-sealed fiberboard container, 12 containers per wooden packing crate. Net Weight = ? lbs. Gross Weight = ? lbs. Volume = 1.45 cubic feet.
R1ADA = 120 rounds of 20 mm BALL Mk.I Cartridge. 10 rounds per moisture-sealed fiberboard container, 12 containers per wooden packing crate. Net Weight = ? lbs. Gross Weight = ? lbs. Volume = 1.45 cubic feet.
R1AFA = 120 rounds of 20 mm High Explosive-Incendiary M97 (T23) Cartridge with M75 (T71E5) Point-Detonating Fuze. 10 rounds per moisture-sealed fiberboard container, 12 containers per wooden packing crate. Net Weight = 68.4 lbs. Gross Weight = 95 lbs. Volume = 1.45 cubic feet.
R1AFB = 150 rounds of 20 mm High Explosive-Incendiary M97 (T23) Cartridge with M75 (T71E5) Point-Detonating Fuze. 10 rounds per moisture-sealed fiberboard container, 15 containers per wooden packing crate. Gross Weight = 106 lbs. Volume = 1.49? cubic feet.
R1AGA = 120 rounds of 20mm Armor Piercing Tracer M95 (T9) Cartridge. 10 rounds per moisture-sealed fiberboard container, 12 containers per wooden packing crate. Gross Weight = 94 lbs. Volume = 1.45 cubic feet.
R1AJA = 120 rounds of 20 mm Practice (T24) Cartridge. 10 rounds per moisture-sealed fiberboard container, 12 containers per wooden packing crate. Gross Weight = 95 lbs. Volume = 1.45 cubic feet.

==== Class R1A (20x110mm Hispano "A"; Ammunition for 20 mm Gun M24) ====
The 20 mm M24 was a variant of the 20 mm M3 designed to use electrically fired instead of percussion-fired shells.

R1AMC = 80 rounds of linked 20 mm with electric primers. Wooden crate. Weight: 72 lbs. Volume: 1.2 Cubic Feet.

==== Class R1B (Belts and Links, 20 mm cartridge) ====
R1BAA = M3 Links, Disintegrating Belt, 20 mm, in wooden packing crate.
R1BBA = M4 Links, Disintegrating Belt, 20 mm, in wooden packing crate.

==== Class R1F (37mm M4 Automatic Gun) ====
R1FAA = 37 mm High-Explosive-Tracer M54 Fixed Shell with timed Self-Destruct and M56 Point-Detonating Fuse.
R1FGA = 37 mm Armor-Piercing-Tracer M80 Fixed Shell.

==== Class R1G (37 mm Gun; Ammunition for Anti-Tank Guns M3 and M3A1, and Tank Guns M5 and M6) ====
NOTE: The M3 was the towed Anti-Tank gun version. The short-barreled M5 and semi-automatic M6 were tank and self-propelled gun variants.

R1GBA = 20 × 37 mm HE M63 Shell with Base Detonating Fuse (M?) in fiberboard tubes in a wooden crate. Volume: 2 cubic feet.
R1GHB = 20 × 37 mm Canister M2 Shell in fiberboard tubes in a wooden crate. (Each shell ontains 122 × 3/8-inch(0.38-caliber) steel balls and acts like a giant shotgun shell.) Gross weight: 97 lbs. Volume: 2 cubic feet.
R1GIA = ? × 37 mm AP Capped-Tracer M51 Shell in wooden crate.
R1HAA = 10 × 37 mm APC-T M51 Shell in wooden crate. Volume: 0.72 cubic feet.

==== Class R1J (57 mm Rifle; Ammunition for M18 Recoilless Rifle) ====
The M18 Recoilless Rifle (final "Trial" designation: T15E16) was developed in 1944. It was available in Europe by March 1945 and in the Pacific by June 1945.

R1JFS = 4 cartridges × 57 mm HEAT M307A1 Shell with Point-Initiating Fuze M90. Wooden crate. Volume: 1 cu ft.
R1JSA = 4 cartridges × 57 mm TP (Training / Practice) Shell. Wooden crate. Gross Weight: 38 lbs. Volume: 1 cu ft.
R1JUA = 4 cartridges × 57 mm Smoke(WP) M308A1 Shell (Steel Case) with Point-Detonating Fuze M503A1. Wooden crate. Gross Weight: 42 lbs. Volume: 1 cu ft.

==== Class R1L (75 mm Guns (all)) ====
R1LCA
R1LFA
R1LGA
R1LLB
R1LNA
R1LPA Smoke (WP)
R1RAA HE Shell M48 with Point Detonating Fuse M48A1, and Powder Charge []
R1RCA HE Shell M48 with Point Detonating Fuse M48A1, and Powder Charge []
R1REA Smoke(HC) Base-Ejecting (Shell M69?) [For use in M2 & M3 Guns]
R3BEA Point-detonating Fuse M46 [For use in M? Gun]

==== Class R1M (75mm Howitzer; Ammunition for ?) ====
R1MLA = 3 × 75mm HE M48 Shell with Point-Detonating Fuze M48A1 packed in tarpaper tubes in triangular wooden "lobster" crate. Gross Weight: 80 lbs. Volume: 1.7 cubic feet.

==== Class R1N (75 mm Rifle; Ammunition for M20 Recoilless Rifle) ====
Although the weapon was developed during World War II, the M20 Recoilless Rifle ("Trial" designation: T21E12) wasn't ready until the spring of 1945. It served mostly in the Korean and Vietnam Wars.

R1NDA = 2 cartridges × 75 mm HEP-TR M349 (Trials designation: T151E21). Volume = 1.64 cubic feet.
R1NRA = 2 cartridges × 75 mm HE M309A1 with M51A5 Point-Detonating fuze. Gross Wt. = 75 lbs. Volume = 1.64 cubic feet.
R1NTB = 2 cartridges × 75 mm Training Practice M309A1 with M51A5 Point-Detonating fuze. Gross Wt. = 78 lbs. Volume = 1.64 cubic feet.

==== Class R1Q (105 mm Howitzer; Semi-Fixed Ammunition for M2, M2A1, and M4 Howitzer) ====
"Semi-Fixed" artillery ammunition is composed of a shell and a propellant cartridge. Pre- and early-war semi-fixed ammunition came packed in black fiberboard tubes packed in a long crate with a volume of 1.94 cubic feet.

The M4 Howitzer was a modified version of the M2A1 used with the M4A3 Sherman Assault Support tank.

R1QBA = 2 × 105 mm HE M1 with M48 or M48A2 Point-Detonating Fuze (0.5 second). Gross Weight: 119 Lbs. Volume: 1.8 cubic feet(?).
R1QBS = 2 × 105 mm HE M1 with M48 Point-Detonating Fuze. Volume: 1.8 cubic feet(?).
R1QCB = 3 × 105 mm HE M1 with M54 Timed Super Quick Fuze. Packed in individual inner black cardboard tubes, 3 tubes packed in outer black cardboard tubes conjoined by three-lobed "cloverleaf" endcaps secured by wingnuts on a central carriage bolt through the center, packed in a long triangular-ended slatted wooden crate. Gross Weight: 172 lbs. Volume: 3.24 Cubic Feet.
R1QCC = 2 × 105 mm HE M1 with M54 Timed Super Quick Fuze. Volume: 1.8 cubic feet(?).
R1QDB = 2 × 105 mm HE M1 with M48A1 Point-Detonating Fuze (0.15 second). Volume: 1.8 cubic feet(?).
R1QDN = 1 × 105 mm HE M1 with M48A1 Point-Detonating Fuze (0.15 second). Packed in an inner cardboard tube inside an M152 outer steel tube with a metal screw cap on one end. Gross Weight: 71 lbs. Volume: 0.8 cubic feet.
R1QDT = 2 × 105 mm HE M1 with M48A1 Point-Detonating Fuze (0.15 second). Volume: 1.8 cubic feet(?).
R1QEB = 2 × 105 mm HEAT M67. Gross Weight: 110 lbs. Volume: 1.8 cubic feet.
R1QGC = 2 × 105 mm Training-Practice M1 empty with inert M48 Point-Detonating Fuze. Gross Weight: 110 lbs. Volume: 1.8 cubic feet.
R1QIA = 2 × 105 mm Casualty Gas (H) M60 with M57 Point-Detonating Fuze. Gross Weight: 121 lbs. Volume: 1.8 cubic feet.
R1QJA = 2 × 105 mm Smoke (WP) M60 with M57 Point-Detonating Fuze. Gross Weight: 123 lbs. Volume: 1.8 cubic feet.
R1QMA = 2 × 105 mm Riot Control Gas (CS) M60. Volume: 1.8 cubic feet.
R1QNA = 2 × 105 mm HE M1 with cavity for Variable Time Fuze T80E6. Gross Weight: 120 lbs. Volume: 1.8 cubic feet.
R1QSA = 2 × 105 mm HE M1 (TNT Filler) with M48A2 Point-Detonating Fuze (0.15 second). Gross Weight: 120 lbs. Volume: 1.8 cubic feet.
R1QSN = 1 × 105 mm HE M1 (TNT Filler) with M48A2 Point-Detonating Fuze (0.15 second). Packed in an inner cardboard tube inside an M152 outer steel tube with a metal screw cap on one end. Gross Weight: 71 lbs. Volume: 0.8 cubic feet.

=== Sub-group R2 (Projectiles and separate-loading propelling charges for medium field artillery, including complete round data) ===
==== Class R2ZD (Ammunition for 4.5" (114mm) Gun, M1) ====
An artillery piece that used the same carriage as the 155mm Howitzer M1 and fired the same ammunition as the British 4.5" Field Gun.

R2ZCD 4.5" HE M65 with Point Detonating Fuze
R2ZDA 4.5" HE M65 with Point Detonating Fuze
R2ZDB 4.5" HE M65 with Fuze and M7 Propelling Charge (Normal)
R2ZDC 4.5" HE M65 with Mechanical Time Fuze and M8 Propelling Charge (Super)

==== Class R2ZE (Ammunition for 155 mm Howitzer; models M1917, M1917A1 & M1918) ====
R2ZAO = 155mm HE M102 with M51A2 Point Detonating Fuze with green bag charge.
R2ZDP = 155mm Smoke (HC, Base-Ejecting) M112? with M54 Time & Super-Quick Fuze with green bag charge.
R2ZEF = 155mm HE M102 with 51A2 Point Detonating Fuze with white bag charge.
R2ZEG = 155mm HE M102 with M54 Time & Super-Quick Fuze with white bag charge.
R2ZEW = 155mm Casualty Gas (H) M105 with M51A1 Point Detonating Fuze with green bag charge.

=== Sub-group R3 (service fuzes and primers for pack, light, and medium field artillery) ===
==== Class R3B (projectile fuzes) ====
R3BEA point-detonating super-quick fuse M46; wooden crate.

==== Class R3F (155 mm Howitzer projectile fuzes) ====
R3FDA 25 × point-detonating fuze M51A3 with M21A2 booster; wooden crate.

==== Class R3G (projectile fuzes) ====
R3GGC 15 x point-detonating fuze M51A5 (fuze M48A3 assembled with M21A4 booster); wooden crate.

=== Sub-group R4 (ammunition for trench mortars; including fuzes, propelling charges and other components) ===
==== Class R4A (ammunition for 2" M3 smoke mortar / launcher) ====
This was an internal gun/mortar mounted in the left side of the turret of the M4 Sherman tank. The M3 mortar was a conversion of the British SBML Ordnance 2-Inch Mortar that was used from 1943-1945. It could lay down a smoke cloud within 20 to 120 yards of the vehicle.

R4AAA = Bomb, Smoke, Mk.I/L.

==== Class R4C (ammunition for 60 mm M2 light mortar) ====
R4CAA = 10? × 60 mm HE M49A2 w/ point-detonating fuze M52 in tarpaper storage tubes in a wooden crate.
R4CAC = 10 × 60 mm HE M49A2 w/ point-detonating fuze M52B1 in tarpaper storage tubes in a wooden crate. Gross Weight: 49 lbs. volume: 1.0 cubic feet.
R4CDA = 10 × 60 mm illumination M83 w/ time fuse in tarpaper storage tubes in a wooden crate.
R4CHA = 10? × 60 mm in tarpaper storage tubes in a wooden crate.
R4CPN = 10 × 60 mm bursting smoke (white phosphorus) M302 w/ point-detonating fuze M527 in tarpaper storage tubes in a wooden crate. Volume: 1.0 cubic feet.

==== Class R4F (ammunition for 81 mm M1 medium mortar or 3-inch (3.2" [81 mm]) Mk.1A2 Stokes trench mortar) ====
The 81 mm mortar shells used an adapter collar to allow 60 mm mortar shell fuzes to fit. Originally packed in wooden crates, the late war shells (1944–1945) were packed in metal M140 canisters. The M140 canister carried live shells in a four-chambered internal divider, had a horsehair pad in the inside of the lid to cushion the fuzes, and had a metal loop carrying handle on the lid that doubled as the locking catch. The M140A1 canister eliminated the divider and carried the shells in tarpaper packing tubes instead.

R4FCM = 4 cartridges 81-mm M43A1 Light HE w/. Point Detonating fuze M52B1 with booster charges, packed in M140 (T16) metal canister. Gross Weight: 48.5 lbs. Volume: 0.71 Cubic Feet.

==== Class R4H (Ammunition for 81 mm M29 or M1 Medium Mortar) ====
R4HUA = 4 cartridges of 81-mm M43A1 Light HE w/. Point Detonating fuze M52B1 with booster charges, packed in wooden crate. Gross Weight: 50.0 lbs. Volume: 1.04 Cubic Feet.
R4HSA = 4 cartridges of 81-mm M43A1 Light HE w/. Point Detonating fuze M52A2 with booster charges, packed in wooden crate. Gross Weight: 50.0 lbs. Volume: 1.04 Cubic Feet.

==== Class R4N (Ammunition for 4.2" [107 mm] M2 Chemical Mortar) ====
R4NAA = 2 cartridges of 4.2" HE M3 w/. M9 Fuze and M6 Propellant Charges in wooden crate. Gross Weight: 56 lbs. Volume: 1.1 Cubic Feet.

=== Sub-group R5 (Ammunition, blank, for Pack, Light, and Medium field artillery) ===
==== Group R5C (Ammunition for 57mm Anti-Tank Gun M1 and 6-Pounder QF 7-cwt Gun) ====
R5CHA = 2 cartridges × 57 mm / 6 Pdr. Blank. Volume: 1.0 cubic feet.
R5CRA = 2 cartridges × 57mm / 6 Pdr. Drill M22. Weight: 46 lbs. Volume: 1.0 cu. ft.

==== Group R5I (Ammunition for 76mm Gun M1, M1A1, and M1A2) ====
R5IAA = 8 × 76 mm cartridges Blank. Volume: 1.12 cubic feet.

=== Sub-group R7 (Land Mines and Fuzes, Demolition Material, and Ammunition for Simulated Artillery and Grenade Fire) ===
==== Class R7A (Land Mines) ====
R7AE (Anti-Personnel Mines M3 and M3A1)

Each wooden crate comes with six mines, six fuzes packed in cylindrical fiberboard containers, six 26-foot-long spools of tripwire (painted either Olive Drab or Sand Color), and a wrench for unscrewing the plastic safety plugs from the mines before inserting the fuze.

R7AEA 6 × Anti-Personnel Mines M3 w/. Fuze M3 per wooden crate. Gross Weight: 73 lbs.
R7AKA 6 × Anti-Personnel Mines M3A1 w/. Fuze M3 per wooden crate. Gross Weight: 73 lbs.

R7AI (Anti-Tank Mines M1 and M1A1)

Each wooden crate comes with the five mines loaded sideways.

R7AIA = 5 × Anti-Tank Mine M1A1 w/. Fuze M1A2 in wooden crate.

==== Class R7B (Arming Plugs for Land Mines) ====
R7BJ (Arming Plug M4 for Anti-Tank Mine M15)
R7BJA = 120 × M4 Arming Plugs for M15 AT Mine in wooden crate.

==== Class R7D (Practice Land Mines) ====
R7DL (M12A1 Practice Heavy Anti-Tank Land Mine, Empty)
R7DLB = 2 × M12A1 Practice Heavy Land Mines in wooden crate. Gross Weight: 40 lbs. Volume: 1.56 Cubic Feet
R7DSA = 6 × Practice Anti-Personnel mines in wooden crate.

==== Class R7E () ====
R7EV (M3 Shaped Charge)
R7EVA = 1 x M3 Shaped Charge [40 lbs.] in wooden crate. Gross Weight: 67 lbs. Volume: 1.85 Cubic Feet.

==== Class R7F (Bangalore Torpedoes) ====
R7FA (M1A1 Bangalore Torpedo)
R7FAB = 10 × M1A1 Bangalore Torpedoes in Wooden Crate. Gross Weight: 176 lbs. Volume: 4.1 Cubic Feet.

==== Class R7H (Demolition Material) ====
R7HCA 16 × M2 Demolition Charge (Tetrytol) [2.5 lbs. each], 8 charges (plus fuze train assembly) per haversack [21 lbs.], 2 haversacks per wooden crate. Net Weight: 42 lbs. Gross Weight: 67 lbs. Volume: 1.3 cubic feet.
R7HDA 16 × M3 Demolition Charge (Composition C3) [2.25 lbs. each], 8 charges (plus fuze train assembly) per haversack [19 lbs.], 2 haversacks per wooden crate. Net Weight: 38 lbs. Gross Weight: 44 lbs. Volume: 0.91 cubic feet.

==== Class R7L (Demolition Kits) ====
R7LY (Demolition Kit M37)
R7LYA = 2 × M37 Demolition Kits in wooden crate. Gross Wt.: 57 lbs., Volume: 1.4 Cu. Ft.

== Group "S" Material (Bombs, grenades, pyrotechnics) ==
=== Sub-group S1 (Bombs, aircraft, all types) ===
S1DDA Bomb, GP, 250lb AN-M57A1 (Tritonal Filling), with transit hoops
S1DGA Bomb, GP, 1000lb AN-M65A1 (Tritonal Filling), with transit hoops
S1FKA 2 × Bombs, Fragmentation, 23lb M72, with fuzes, in wooden crate
S1GDA Bomb, Chemical, 500lb AN-M78 (AC Filling), with transit hoops
S1HGA Bomb, GP, 1000lb AN-M65A1 (TNT Filling), with transit hoops
S1HMA Bomb, GP, 1000lb AN-M65A1 (Composition B Filling), with transit hoops
S1HTA Bomb, GP, 500lb AN-M64A1 (TNT Filling), with transit hoops
S1HVA Cluster, Fragmentation, 500lb size T4E4 (AN-M26), of 20 × Bombs, Fragmentation, AN-M41A1, in steel drum
S1HWA Bomb, GP, 500lb AN-M64A1 (Composition B Filling), with transit hoops
S1ICA Bomb, GP, 500lb AN-M64A1 (Tritonal Filling), with transit hoops
S1VAA Cluster, Fragmentation, 100lb size AN-M1A2, of 6 × Bombs, Fragmentation, 20lb AN-M41A1, unfuzed, in wooden crate
S1VBA Cluster, Fragmentation, 100lb size AN-M4A1, of 3 × Bombs, Fragmentation, 23lb AN-M40 or AN-M40A1, unfuzed, in wooden crate
S1ZVA Cluster, Practice, 100lb size M2, of 6 × Bombs, Practice, 20lb M48 with Fuzes M110, in wooden crate
S1ZVB Cluster, Fragmentation, 100lb size M1, of 6 × Bombs, Fragmentation, 20lb M41 with Fuzes M110, in wooden crate
S1ZVD Cluster, Fragmentation, 100lb size M1A1, of 6 × Bombs, Fragmentation, 20lb M48 with Fuzes M110, in wooden crate
S1ZVE Cluster, Practice, 100lb size M2A1, of 6 × Bombs, Practice, 20lb M48 with Fuzes M110, in wooden crate
S1ZVF Cluster, Fragmentation, 100lb size M4, of 3 × Bombs, Fragmentation, 23lb M40 with Fuzes M104, in wooden crate
S1ZVG Cluster, Fragmentation, 100lb size M1, of 6 × Bombs, Fragmentation, 20lb M41 with Fuzes M110A1, in wooden crate
S1ZVH Cluster, Fragmentation, 100lb size M1A1, of 6 × Bombs, Fragmentation, 20lb M41 with Fuzes M110, in wooden crate
S1ZVI Cluster, Practice, 100lb size M2, of 6 × Bombs, Practice, 20lb M48 with Fuzes M110A1, in wooden crate
S1ZVJ Cluster, Practice, 100lb size M2A1, of 6 × Bombs, Practice, 20lb M48 with Fuzes M110A1, in wooden crate
S1ZVK Cluster, Fragmentation, 100lb size M4, of 3 × Bombs, Fragmentation, 23lb M40 with fuzes M120 in wooden crate
S1ZVL Cluster, Fragmentation, 100lb size AN-M1A1, of 6 × Bombs, Fragmentation, 20lb AN-M41 with Fuzes AN-M110A1, in wooden crate
S1ZVN Cluster, Fragmentation, 100lb size AN-M4, of 3 × Bombs, Fragmentation, 23lb AN-M40 with Fuzes AN-M104, in wooden crate
S1ZVO Cluster, Fragmentation, 100lb size AN-M4, of 3 × Bombs, Fragmentation, 23lb AN-M40 with fuzes AN-M120 in wooden crate
S1ZVP Cluster, Practice, 100lb size AN-M2A1, of 6 × Bombs, Practice, 20lb AN-M48 with Fuzes M110A1, in wooden crate
S1ZVQ Cluster, Fragmentation, 500lb size AN-M26, of 20 × Bombs, Fragmentation, 20lb AN-M41 with Fuzes AN-M110A1, in steel drum
S1ZVT Cluster, Practice, 100lb size AN-M2A1, of 6 × Bombs, Practice, 20lb AN-M48 with Fuzes M110, in wooden crate.

=== Sub-group S2 (Fuzes and miscellaneous explosive components for aircraft bombs) ===
AN- stands for "Army / Navy", meaning it is a common supply item for both the War and Navy departments.

S2FRB = 9 × Fuzes, Bomb, Tail, AN-M100A2 (Non-Delay), in metal cans, in wooden crate.
S2MUA = 30 × Fuzes, Bomb, Nose, AN-M158, in metal cans, in wooden crate.
S2NLA = 48 × Fuzes, Bomb, Nose, AN-M126A1, in metal cans, in wooden crate.
S2NRA = 25 × Fuzes, Bomb, Nose, AN-M103A1, in metal cans, in wooden crate.
S2QNA = 25 × Fuzes, Bomb, Tail, AN-M100A1, in metal cans, in wooden crate.
S2QQB = 9 × Fuzes, Bomb, Tail, AN-M102A2 (.025 Sec Delay), in metal cans, in wooden crate.

=== Sub-group S3 (Fin assemblies, and miscellaneous inert components for aircraft bombs) ===
S3FHB = 20 × Containers, 100 Arming Wire Assemblies, in wooden crate.
S3JWA = Fin Assembly, 250lb size, AN-M106A1, with/without accessories, in metal crate.
S3POB = 5 × Arming Wire Assemblies for Bomb, Chemical, 100lb M47A2, in round metal tin.
S3RHB = 5 × Arming Wire Assemblies for Bomb, Fragmentation, 260lb AN-M81, in round metal tin.

=== Sub-group S4 (Grenades, hand and rifle, and fuzing components) ===
==== Class S4F (Rifle Grenades, Signal, Colored Smoke, Ground, for Grenade Launchers M1, M2, M7, & M8) ====
S4FK (M22A3 Rifle Grenade, Smoke, Ground, Green)
S4FKA = 10 × M22A3 Rifle Grenades in fiberboard tubes in wooden crate. Comes with 3 Launcher Positioning Clips and an M13 Grenade Launcher Assortment metal ammo can (1 × 10-round carton of .30-'06 Grenade Blank M3 and 1 × 5-round packets (5 cartridges) of M7 Grenade Auxiliary Cartridges). Gross Weight: 39 lbs. Volume: 1.13 cubic feet.
S4FH (M23A1 Rifle Grenade, Smoke Streamer, Green)
S4FHA = 10 × M23A1 Rifle Grenades in fiberboard tubes in wooden crate. Comes with 3 Launcher Positioning Clips and an M13 Grenade Launcher Assortment metal ammo can (1 × 10-round carton of .30-'06 Grenade Blank M3 and 2 × 5-round packets (10 cartridges) of M7 Grenade Auxiliary Cartridges). Gross Weight: 38 lbs. Volume: 0.98 cubic feet.

==== Class S4G (Mk.II Fragmentation Grenade) ====
S4GCA = 25 × Mk.2 Fragmentation Grenades (Fuse M10A2 or M10A3) in M41 Fiber Containers (fiberboard storage tubes) in a wooden crate. Gross Weight: 53 lbs. Volume: 1.25 Cubic Feet.
S4GGA = 25 × M21 Practice Grenades (Fuse M10A2) in M41 Fiber Containers (fiberboard storage tubes) in a wooden crate. Gross Weight: 55 lbs. Volume: 1.25 Cubic Feet. Later reclassified as the S4MAA Mk.I-A1 Training Grenade.
S4GIA = 25 × Mk.2 Fragmentation Grenades (Fuse M10A3) in M41 Fiber Containers (fiberboard storage tubes) in a wooden crate. Gross Weight: 53 lbs. Volume: 1.25 Cubic Feet.
S4GIA = 25 × Mk.2 Fragmentation Grenades (Fuse M6A4C) in M41 Fiber Containers (fiberboard storage tubes) in a wooden crate. Gross Weight: 55 lbs. Volume: 1.25 Cubic Feet.
S4GQA = 25 × Mk.2 Fragmentation Grenades (Fuse M204A1) in M41 Fiber Containers (fiberboard storage tubes) in a wooden crate. Gross Weight: 53 lbs. Volume: 1.25 Cubic Feet.

==== Class S4K (Mk.III Offensive Grenade) ====
Note: Since it was a high explosive grenade, they were shipped without fuzes to prevent accidental detonation during shipping.

S4KBA = 50 × Mk.3A2 Offensive Grenades (Unfused) in a wooden crate. The Mk.3A2 grenade used the M6A3 igniter fuse, later replaced with the M206 fuze.

==== Class S4M (Mk.I-A1 Practice Grenade) ====
- S4MAA = 24 x Mk.I-A1 Training Handgrenades (Fuse M10A3) packed in M41 fiberboard storage tubes in a wooden crate. Gross Weight: 55 lbs.? Volume: 1.25 cu. ft.

==== Class S4N (M9 Anti-Tank Rifle Grenade) ====
S4NBA = 10 × M9A1 HEAT Rifle Grenades packed in fiberboard storage tubes in a wooden crate with metal M13 Grenade Launcher Assortment ammo can (1 carton of 10 × .30-'06 Grenade Blank M3 cartridges and 2 packets of 5 × M7 Grenade Auxiliary Blank Cartridges). Gross Weight: 32 lbs.
S4NBB = 10 × M9A1 HEAT Rifle Grenades packed in fiberboard storage tubes in a wooden crate with metal M13 Grenade Launcher Assortment ammo can (1 carton of 10 × .30-'06 Grenade Blank M3 cartridges, 1 carton of 6 × .30 Carbine Grenade Blank M6 cartridges, and 1 packet of 5 × M7 Grenade Auxiliary Cartridges). Gross Weight: 32 lbs.
S4NBC = 10 × M9A1 HEAT Rifle Grenades packed in fiberboard storage tubes in a wooden crate with metal M13 Grenade Launcher Assortment ammo can (1 carton of 10 × .30-'06 Grenade Blank M3 cartridges, 1 carton of 6 × .30 Carbine Grenade Blank M6 cartridges, and 1 packet of 5 × M7 Grenade Auxiliary Cartridges). Gross Weight: 31 lbs. Volume: 0.95 Cu. Ft. The crate was vertical with a thick side-folding metal carrying handle on top for easy carrying. It opened from the side like an M1 or M2 ammo can and had a metal hasp on one end and a triangular metal hinge on the opposite end.
S4NGA = 50 × M11A2 Practice HEAT Rifle Grenades packed in fiberboard storage tubes in a wooden crate with 5 metal M13 Grenade Launcher Assortment ammo cans (1 carton of 10 × .30-'06 Grenade Blank M3 cartridges, 1 carton of 6 × .30 Carbine Grenade Blank M6 cartridges, and 1 packet of 5 × M7 Grenade Auxiliary Cartridges). Gross Weight: 32 lbs. Volume: 3.5 Cubic Feet.

==== Class S4Q (Adapter, Grenade Projection) ====
S4QF (M1A1 Grenade Projection Adapter, for use with the Mk.II Fragmentation Grenade)

Note: The M1A1 Grenade Projection Adapter converted a Mk.II fragmentation grenade into a rifle grenade.

S4QFD = 48 × M1A1 Grenade Projection Adapters. Comes with 5 × metal M13 Grenade Launcher Assortment ammo cans (1 carton of 10 × .30-'06 Grenade Blank M3 cartridges, 1 carton of 6 × .30 Carbine Grenade Blank M6 cartridges, and 1 packet of 5 × M7 Grenade Auxiliary Cartridges). Volume: 1.75 Cubic Feet.

=== Sub-group S5 (Pyrotechnics, military, all types) ===
==== Class S5P (Signal, Illumination, Aircraft, for Pyrotechnic Pistol AN-M8) ====
S5PD (Aircraft Illumination Signal, 37 mm AN-M37A1, Double Star Flare, Red-Red)
S5PDC = 72 cartridges × Signal, Illumination, Aircraft, 37 mm AN-M37A1, Double Star Flare, Red-Red, 6 cartons of 12 cartridges each, in wooden crate. Gross Weight: 36 lbs. Volume: 0.75 cubic feet.

==== Class S5R (Signal, Illumination, Ground, for Rifle Grenade Launchers M1, M2, M7, & M8) ====
S5RM (M22A1 Rifle Grenade, Ground Signal, Amber Star Cluster Flare)
S5RMA 48 × M22A1 rifle grenades, in fiberboard tubes, in wooden crate. Comes with 5 × M13 metal Grenade Launcher Assortment ammo cans (1 carton of 10 × .30-'06 M3 Grenade Blank cartridges, 1 carton of 6 × .30 Carbine M6 Grenade Blank cartridges, and 1 packet of 5 × M7 Grenade Auxiliary Cartridges).
S5RMB 30 × M22A1 rifle grenades, in fiberboard tubes, in wooden crate. Comes with 3 × M13 metal Grenade Launcher Assortment ammo cans (1 carton of 10 × .30-'06 M3 Grenade Blank cartridges, 1 carton of 6 × .30 Carbine M6 Grenade Blank cartridges, and 1 packet of 5 × M7 Grenade Auxiliary Cartridges).
S5RO (M21A1 Rifle Grenade, Ground Signal, Amber Star Parachute Flare)
S5ROA 48 × M21A1 rifle grenades, in fiberboard tubes, in wooden crate. Comes with 5 × M13 metal Grenade Launcher Assortment ammo cans (1 carton of 10 × .30-'06 M3 Grenade Blank cartridges, 1 carton of 6 × .30 Carbine M6 Grenade Blank cartridges, and 1 packet of 5 × M7 Grenade Auxiliary Cartridges).
S5ROB 30 × M21A1 rifle grenades, in fiberboard tubes, in wooden crate. Comes with 3 × M13 metal Grenade Launcher Assortment ammo cans (1 carton of 10 × .30-'06 M3 Grenade Blank cartridges, 1 carton of 6 × .30 Carbine M6 Grenade Blank cartridges, and 1 packet of 5 × M7 Grenade Auxiliary Cartridges).
S5RP (M20A1 Rifle Grenade, Ground Signal, Green Star Cluster Flare)
S5RPA 48 × M20A1 rifle grenades, in fiberboard tubes, in wooden crate. Comes with 5 × M13 metal Grenade Launcher Assortment ammo cans (1 carton of 10 × .30-'06 M3 Grenade Blank cartridges, 1 carton of 6 × .30 Carbine M6 Grenade Blank cartridges, and 1 packet of 5 × M7 Grenade Auxiliary Cartridges).
S5RPB 30 × M20A1 rifle grenades, in fiberboard tubes, in wooden crate. Comes with 3 × M13 metal Grenade Launcher Assortment ammo cans (1 carton of 10 × .30-'06 M3 Grenade Blank cartridges, 1 carton of 6 × .30 Carbine M6 Grenade Blank cartridges, and 1 packet of 5 × M7 Grenade Auxiliary Cartridges).
S5RQ (M19A1 Rifle Grenade, Ground Signal, Green Star Parachute Flare)
S5RQA 48 × M19A1 rifle grenades, in fiberboard tubes, in wooden crate. Comes with 3 × M13 metal Grenade Launcher Assortment ammo cans (1 carton of 10 × .30-'06 M3 Grenade Blank cartridges, 1 carton of 6 × .30 Carbine M6 Grenade Blank cartridges, and 1 packet of 5 × M7 Grenade Auxiliary Cartridges).
S5RQB 30 × M19A1 rifle grenades, in fiberboard tubes, in wooden crate. Comes with 3 × M13 metal Grenade Launcher Assortment ammo cans (1 carton of 10 × .30-'06 M3 Grenade Blank cartridges, 1 carton of 6 × .30 Carbine M6 Grenade Blank cartridges, and 1 packet of 5 × M7 Grenade Auxiliary Cartridges).
S5RR (M18A1 Rifle Grenade, Ground Signal, White Star Cluster Flare)
S5RRA 48 × M18A1 rifle grenades, in fiberboard tubes, in wooden crate. Comes with 5 × M13 metal Grenade Launcher Assortment ammo cans (1 carton of 10 × .30-'06 M3 Grenade Blank cartridges, 1 carton of 6 × .30 Carbine M6 Grenade Blank cartridges, and 1 packet of 5 × M7 Grenade Auxiliary Cartridges).
S5RRB 30 × M18A1 rifle grenades, in fiberboard tubes, in wooden crate. Comes with 3 × M13 metal Grenade Launcher Assortment ammo cans (1 carton of 10 × .30-'06 M3 Grenade Blank cartridges, 1 carton of 6 × .30 Carbine M6 Grenade Blank cartridges, and 1 packet of 5 × M7 Grenade Auxiliary Cartridges).
S5RS (M17A1 Rifle Grenade, Ground Signal, White Star Parachute Flare)
S5RSA 48 × M17A1 rifle grenades, in fiberboard tubes, in wooden crate. Comes with 5 × M13 metal Grenade Launcher Assortment ammo cans (1 carton of 10 × .30-'06 M3 Grenade Blank cartridges, 1 carton of 6 × .30 Carbine M6 Grenade Blank cartridges, and 1 packet of 5 × M7 Grenade Auxiliary Cartridges).
S5RSB 30 × M17A1 rifle grenades, in fiberboard tubes, in wooden crate. Comes with 3 × M13 metal Grenade Launcher Assortment ammo cans (1 carton of 10 × .30-'06 M3 Grenade Blank cartridges, 1 carton of 6 × .30 Carbine M6 Grenade Blank cartridges, and 1 packet of 5 × M7 Grenade Auxiliary Cartridges).
S5RT (M51A1 Rifle Grenade, Ground Signal, Red Star Parachute Flare)
S5RTA 48 × M51A1 rifle grenades, in fiberboard tubes, in wooden crate. Comes with 5 × M13 metal Grenade Launcher Assortment ammo cans (1 carton of 10 × .30-'06 M3 Grenade Blank cartridges and 1 carton of 6 × .30 Carbine M6 Grenade Blank cartridges). Gross Weight: 86 lbs. Volume: 2.46 cubic feet.
S5RTB 30 × M51A1 rifle grenades, in fiberboard tubes, in wooden crate. Comes with 3 × M13 metal Grenade Launcher Assortment ammo cans (1 carton of 10 × .30-'06 M3 Grenade Blank cartridges, 1 carton of 6 × .30 Carbine M6 Grenade Blank cartridges, and 1 packet of 5 × M7 Grenade Auxiliary Cartridges).
S5RU (M52A1 Rifle Grenade, Ground Signal, Red Star Cluster Flare)
S5RUA 48 × M52A1 rifle grenades, in fiberboard tubes, in wooden crate. Comes with 5 × metal M13 Grenade Launcher Assortment ammo cans (1 carton of 10 × .30-'06 M3 Grenade Blank cartridges, 1 carton of 6 × .30 Carbine M6 Grenade Blank cartridges, and 1 packet of 5 × M7 Grenade Auxiliary Cartridges). Gross Weight: 81 lbs., Volume: 2.46 Cubic Feet.
S5RUB 30 × M52A1 rifle grenades, in fiberboard tubes, in wooden crate. Comes with 3 × M13 metal Grenade Launcher Assortment ammo cans (1 carton of 10 × .30-'06 M3 Grenade Blank cartridges, 1 carton of 6 × .30 Carbine M6 Grenade Blank cartridges, and 1 packet of 5 × M7 Grenade Auxiliary Cartridges).

==== Class S5T (Trip Flare) ====
S5TBA 4 × M48 Trip Flare, Parachute kit (with firing mechanism and a coil of tripwire), 1 kit per carton, 4 cartons per wooden crate.
S5TCA 4 × M49 Trip Flare kit (with firing mechanism and a coil of tripwire), 1 kit per carton, 4 cartons per wooden crate.

=== Sub-group S9 (Rockets, all types) ===
==== Class S9A (2.36" Rocket for Anti-Tank Rocket Launchers M1, M1A1, M9, & M9A1) ====
Note = The fiberboard packing tubes are sealed with colored tape. The color of the tape indicates what type of rocket it is: yellow is HEAT, gray is Smoke, and blue is Practice. Early M6 HE(AT) and M7 Practice rockets can only be fired out of M1 launchers because they have an earlier ignition system that cannot be activated out of an M1A1, M9, or M9A1 launcher.

- S9ACA = 20 × 2.36" M6A1 Rockets, HE (Anti-Tank) [For use with M1A1 Rocket Launcher], in M87 fiberboard tubes, in wooden crate. Gross Weight: 128 lbs. Volume: 3.7 cubic feet.
- S9ADA = 20 × 2.36" M7A1 Rockets, Practice [For use with M1A1 Rocket Launcher], in M87 fiberboard tubes, in wooden crate. Gross Weight: Volume: 3.7 cubic feet.
- S9AEA = ? × 2.36" M? Rockets, Smoke [For use with modified M1 Rocket Launcher], in fiberboard tubes, in wooden crate.
- S9AFA = ? × 2.36" M6A1 Rockets, HE (Anti-Tank) [For use with modified M1 Rocket Launcher], in fiberboard tubes, in wooden crate.
- S9AKA = 12 × 2.36" M10 Rockets, Bursting Smoke (White Phosphorus), in fiberboard tubes, in wooden crate. Gross Weight: 68 lbs. Volume: 2.4 cubic feet.
- S9ALA = 8 × 2.36" M6A3 Rockets, HE (Anti-Tank) [For use with M9 and M9A1 Rocket Launcher], in M87 fiberboard tubes, in wooden crate. Gross Weight: 54 lbs.Volume: 1.41 cubic feet.
- S9ASB = 8 × 2.36" M7A6 Rockets, Practice, in fiberboard tubes, in wooden crate. Gross Weight: 53 lbs.Volume: 1.41 cubic feet.

==== Class S9IKA (Fuses for Rockets) ====
- S9IKA = 12 × Variable Time (VT) Fuze M402 in metal packing box. Gross Weight: 67 lbs.Volume: 1.24 cubic feet.

==== Class S9J (3.5" Rocket for Anti-Tank Rocket Launcher M20) ====
- S9JKA = 3 × 3.5" M28 Rockets, HE (Anti-Tank) in fiberboard tubes, in a wooden crate. Gross Weight: 53 lbs. Volume: 1.59 cubic feet.
- S9JNA = 3 × 3.5" M28A2 Rockets, HE (Anti-Tank) w/. Composition B warhead in fiberboard tubes, in a wooden crate. Gross Weight: 55.7 lbs. Volume: 1.59 cubic feet.

== Group "T" Material (Small Arms Ammunition) ==
=== Sub-group T1 (Ammunition for Rifle, Carbine and Automatic Gun) ===
After 1948, the AIC number "1" was replaced by the letter "A" to indicate the small arms ammunition was packed in the new M20 or M21 ammo cans instead of the myriad World War II-era packing boxes and cans.

==== Class T1A (.22 Long Rifle; Gallery Practice Ammunition) ====
The military used .22-caliber training rifles to teach basic marksmanship before transitioning to full-bore service rifles.

T1AAA = 10,000 cartridges of .22 Long Rifle Ball, in 50-round cartons. They were packed 10 cartons per cardboard box (500 rounds) and there were 20 boxes per wooden crate. Gross Weight: 85 lbs. Volume: 0.7 Cubic Feet.
TAAAA = 6,000 cartridges of .22 Long Rifle Ball, in 50-round cartons in M20 ammo cans (60 × 50-round cartons; 3,000 rounds), 2 × M20 cans in an M22 wooden crate. Gross Weight: 60 lbs. Volume: 0.75 Cubic Feet.

==== Class T1C (.30 Carbine; Ammunition for .30-caliber Carbine M1) ====
This ammunition was for use with the M1 Carbine, a different weapon than the M1 Garand Rifle. The primers for the cartridges were non-corrosive because the M1 carbine's gas-system would have fouled or corroded if standard corrosive primers were used. It only came in Grade R ("Rifle") because the M1 Carbine was semi-automatic only, dispensing with the use for Grade 2 for an automatic weapon. The late-war creation of the M2 selective-fire carbine and M3 infra-red sniper carbine didn't change this.

Cartons (1942–1948)

Note = .30 Carbine ammunition was not carried or packed in bandoleers during World War 2.
T1CAA = 2,700 cartridges of .30 Carbine Ball M1, Grade R, in 45-round cartons packed in a small metal-lined M1917 wooden Packing Box. There were 60 cartons per box. Pre-War packing used 45-round cartons divided into three 15-round packs. M1 Carbines used 15-round box magazines, so the packs made sure that ammunition would not be wasted. Gross Weight:? Volume: 0.83 cubic feet.
T1CAA = 3,000 cartridges of .30 Carbine Ball M1, Grade R, in 50-round cartons packed in a small metal-lined M1917 wooden Packing Box. There were 60 cartons per box. The packing was changed in 1942 to 50-round cartons (3000 rounds per crate) to maximize how much ammunition could be shipped. Gross Weight:? Volume: 0.83 cubic feet.
T1CAD = 3,000 cartridges of .30 Carbine Ball M1, Grade R, in 50-round cartons, 30 cartons per T3 waxed cardboard box (1500 rounds), 2 × T3 waxed cardboard boxes per T4 wooden crate (3,000 rounds total). Gross Weight: 98 lbs. Volume: 0.83 cubic feet. This experimental packing method was used to ship ammunition overseas, but without the metal ternplate liner to make it easier and faster to open in combat. It was found to be ineffective, so the crates were recalled in 1944 and repacked in M6 ammo cans by Evansville Chrysler (EC).
T1CAE = 2,000 cartridges of .30 Carbine Ball M1, Grade R, in 50-round cartons packed in a commercial packing box. There were 40 cartons per box.
T1CAF = 3,450 cartridges of .30 Carbine Ball M1, Grade R, in 50-round cartons packed in a wooden M1917 ammunition chest. There were 69 cartons per box. Gross Weight: 110 lbs. Volume: 0.92 Cu. Ft.
T1CAF = 3,200 cartridges of .30 Carbine Ball M1, Grade R, in 50-round cartons packed in M6 ammo cans. Each M6 ammo can contained 16 cartons (800 rounds). There were 4 × M6 ammo cans per crate.
T1CAH = 2,400 cartridges of .30 Carbine Ball M1, Grade R, in 50-round cartons packed in M6 ammo cans. Each M6 ammo can contained 16 cartons (800 rounds). There were 3 × M6 ammo cans per M4 crate. Gross Weight: 85 lbs. Volume: 0.87 cubic feet.
T1CAI = 3,150 cartridges of .30 Carbine Ball M1, Grade R, in 50-round cartons packed in a metal-lined wooden box. There were 63 cartons per box. Gross Weight: 108 lbs. Volume: 1 cubic foot.
T1CAJ = 1,600 cartridges of .30 Carbine Ball M1, Grade R, in 50-round cartons packed in M6 ammo cans. Each M6 ammo can contained 16 cartons (800 rounds). There were 2 × M6 ammo cans per M7 ammo crate. Gross Weight: 59 lbs. Volume: 0.662 cubic feet.

Cartons (1948–1958)

TACAA = 1,800 cartridges of .30 Carbine Ball M1, Grade R, in 50-round cartons packed in M20 ammo cans. Each M20 ammo can contained 18 cartons (900 rounds). There were 2 × M20 ammo cans per M22 ammo crate. Gross Weight: 49 lbs. Volume: 0.75 Cu. Ft.
T1CAZ-5 = 4,800 cartridges of .30 Carbine Ball M1, Grade R, in 50-round cartons, 16 cartons per M6 ammo can (800 rounds), 3 × M6 ammo cans per rectangular cardboard box (2,400 rounds), 2 vertically-stacked cardboard boxes per metal 20mm Autocannon MK 1 MOD 0 ammo box. Gross Weight: ?, Volume: 1.5 cu ft. Postwar repacking of WW2 ammunition for use by the US Navy and Marine Corps. This was designed to replace the wooden small M1917 Packing Box and M7 ammo crate.

Bandoleers (1948–1958)

After World War II .30 Carbine ammunition began being packed in stripper clips. Each pre-packed M1 bandoleer had 6 pockets (containing 2 stripper clips each) for a total of 120 rounds per bandolier. The stripper clips did not require a separate magazine guide because they had a magazine guide built-in to speed reloading.
TACAL = 1,200 cartridges of .30 Carbine Ball M1, in 10-round stripper clips in M1 bandoleers (120 rounds), packed in M20 ammo cans. Each M20 ammo can contained 5 × M1 bandoleers (600 rounds total). There were 2 × M20 ammo cans per wooden M22 ammo crate. Gross Weight: 51 lbs. Volume: 0.75 cubic feet.
TACCA = 1,200 cartridges of .30 Carbine Tracer M27, in 10-round stripper clips in M1 bandoleers (120 rounds), packed in M20 ammo cans. Each M20 ammo can contained 5 × M1 bandoleers (600 rounds total). There were 2 × M20 ammo cans per wooden M22 ammo crate. Gross Weight: 52 lbs. Volume: 0.75 Cubic Feet

==== Class T1E (Caliber .30; Ammunition for .30-caliber Rifles and Machine Guns) ====
This ammunition was used in the M1903 Springfield, M1917 Enfield, and M1 Garand rifles, the Browning Automatic Rifle (BAR), and the Browning M1917 water-cooled and Browning M1919 air-cooled machine guns.

There were three cartridge grades based on accuracy and reliability: "AC/R", "MG", and "3". Test batches would be randomly drawn from a lot and they would be chambered and fired individually from a fixed bench-rested barrel and mechanism at a stationary round "bullseye" target 600 feet away. "AC" (Aircraft), the most accurate and reliable, was similar to the RAF's "Red Label" ammunition used in their synchronized aircraft machine guns. It had to be grouped within a 5-inch circle and not exceed a specified maximum number of stoppages to be acceptable. It came in metal linked belts and was suitable for aircraft and anti-aircraft machine-guns. "R" (Rifle) had to be grouped within a 5-inch circle; it came packed in cartons or bandoleers and was suitable for use in rifles. "MG" (Machine Gun), the least accurate, had to be grouped within a 7.5-inch circle; it came in woven belts and was suitable for use in ground machine-guns. Class 3 (Unsuitable) was rejected for not meeting standards.

Ammunition Lot Numbers had a code letter prefix in-between the Manufacturer code and Lot Number to indicate how it was packed: "C" indicated rifle ammunition preloaded in clips, "B" indicated Belted (woven cloth belt) machine gun ammunition, and "L" indicated Linked (disintegrating metal link belt) machine gun ammunition.

Cartons (1939–1948)

T1EDM = 1500 cartridges .30-06 AP M2, in 20-round cartons, 75 cartons per metal-lined wooden crate M1917. Gross Weight: 113 lbs. Volume: 1.5 cubic feet.
T1EDW = 1320 cartridges .30-06 AP M2, in 20-round cartons, 11 cartons per M10 ammo can (220 rounds), 6 × M10 ammo cans per metal Mk.1 Mod.0 ammo box. Gross Weight: ? Volume: 1.5 cubic feet.
T1EGB = 1500 cartridges .30-06 Ball M2 (Grade AC), in 20-round cartons, 75 cartons per metal-lined wooden crate M1917. Gross Weight: 106 lbs. Volume: 1.5 cubic feet.
T1EGM = 960 cartridges .30-06 Ball M2, in 20-round cartons, 12 cartons per waxed cardboard box (240 rounds), 4 × waxed cardboard boxes per wooden crate. Gross Weight: 72 lbs. Volume: 1.2 cubic feet.
T1EGN = 1500 cartridges .30-06 Ball M2 (Grade AC/R), in 20-round cartons, 75 cartons per metal-lined wooden crate M1917. Gross Weight: 113 lbs. Volume: 1.5 cubic feet.
T1EGO = 1500 cartridges .30-06 Ball M2 (Grade R), 20-round cartons, 75 cartons per metal-lined wooden chest M1917. Gross Weight: 106 lbs. Volume: 1.5 cubic feet.
T1EHS = 480 rounds .30-06 Ball M2, in 20-round cartons, 12 cartons per M8 ammo can (240 rounds), 2 x M8 cans per wooden M9 crate. Gross Weight: Volume: 0.7 cu ft.
T1EHW = 1320 cartridges .30-06 Ball M2, in 20-round cartons, 11 cartons per M10 ammo can (220 rounds), 6 × M10 ammo cans per metal 20mm Mk.1 Mod.0 ammo box. Gross Weight: ? Volume: 1.5 cubic feet.
T1ELB = 480 cartridges, .30-06 Frangible M22 (Trials designation: T-44) (Grade MG), in 20-round cartons, Gross Weight: 36 lbs. Volume: 0.7 cubic feet.
T1EPD = 1500 Cartridges .30-06 Tracer M1, in 20-round cartons, 75 cartons per metal-lined wooden crate M1917. Gross Weight: 108 lbs. Volume: 1.5 cubic feet.

Cartons (1948–1958)

TAEHB = 1040 cartridges .30-06 Ball M2, in 20-round cartons, 26 cartons per M21 ammo can (520 rounds), 2 × M21 ammo cans per M23 wooden crate. Gross Weight: 83 lbs. Volume: 1.2 cubic feet.
TAEPA = 1040 cartridges .30-06 TR M25, in 20-round cartons, 26 cartons per M21 ammo can (520 rounds), 2 × M21 ammo cans per M23 wooden crate. Gross Weight: ? Volume: 1.2 cubic feet.
T1EHW-5 = 1320 cartridges .30-06 Ball M2 (Grade AC/R), in 20-round cartons, 11 cartons per M10 ammo can (220 rounds), 6 × M10 ammo cans per metal Mk.1 Mod.0 ammo box. Gross Weight: ? Volume: 1.5 cubic feet. Postwar repacked WW2 ammunition for use by the Navy and Marine Corps. It replaced the wooden large M1917 Ammo Packing Box and M9 crate.

Bandoleers (1939–1948)
Note: 5-round Mauser-style stripper clips were used by the M1903 Springfield and M1917 Enfield. 8-round Mannlicher-style en-bloc clips were used by the M1 Garand. The M1 Bandoleer had six pockets; each pocket could hold either two 5-round stripper clips (60 rounds total) or one 8-round en-bloc clip (48 rounds total).
The symbol for ammunition packed in stripper clips was 5 bullets conjoined by a long rectangle across the base (looking like 5 bullets in a Mauser clip); there were two symbols in a vertical column per side. The symbol for ammunition packed in en-bloc clips was a rectangular oval with 2 rows of 4 dots (looking like eight rounds in an en-bloc clip); there were one or two symbols in a vertical column per side.

T1EDC = 1500 cartridges .30-06 AP M2 (Grade R), 5-round stripper clips in bandoleers (12 clips / 60 rounds), 25 bandoleers per metal-lined wooden chest M1917. Volume: 1.5 cubic feet.
T1EDV = 1344 cartridges .30-06 AP M2 (Grade R), 8-round en-bloc clips in bandoleers (6 clips / 48 rounds), 28 bandoleers per metal-lined wooden chest M1917. Gross Weight: 111 lbs. Volume: 1.5 cubic feet.
T1EFA = 1200 cartridges .30-06 Ball M1, 8-round stripper clips in bandoleers (6 clips / 48 rounds), 25 bandoleers per metal-lined wooden chest M1917. Volume: 1.5 cubic feet.
T1EGK = 1500 cartridges .30-06 Ball M2 (Grade R), 5-round stripper clips in bandoleers (12 clips / 60 rounds), 25 bandoleers per metal-lined wooden chest M1917. Gross Weight: 112 lbs. Volume: 1.5 cubic feet.
T1EHA = 1344 cartridges .30-06 Ball M2 (Grade R), 8-round en-bloc clips in bandoleers (6 clips / 48 rounds), 28 bandoleers per metal-lined wooden chest M1917. Gross Weight: 108 lbs. Volume: 1.5 cubic feet.
T1EHO = 480 cartridges .30-06 Ball M2, 5-round clips in bandoleers (12 clips / 60 rounds), 4 bandoleers per M8 ammo can (240 rounds), 2 × M8 ammo cans per M9 wooden crate. Gross Weight: 42 lbs. Volume: 0.7 cubic feet.
T1EHP = 480 cartridges .30-06 Ball M2, 8-round clips in bandoleers (6 clips / 48 rounds), 5 bandoleers per M8 ammo can (240 rounds), 2 × M8 ammo cans per M9 wooden crate. Gross Weight: 46 lbs. Volume: 0.7 cubic feet.
T1EPC = 1500 cartridges .30-06 Tracer M1 (Grade R), 5-round stripper clips in bandoleers (12 clips / 60 rounds), 25 bandoleers per metal-lined wooden chest M1917
T1EPM = 1344 cartridges .30-06 Tracer M1 (Grade R), 8-round en-bloc clips in bandoleers (6 clips / 48 rounds), 28 bandoleers per metal-lined wooden chest M1917
T1EPP = 480 cartridges .30-06 Tracer M1, 8-round clips in bandoleers (6 clips / 48 rounds), 5 bandoleers per M8 ammo can (240 rounds), 2 × M8 ammo cans per M9 wooden crate. Gross Weight: 44 lbs. Volume: 0.7 cubic feet.

Bandoleers (1948–1958)
Note: The ammunition now only came in 8-round en-bloc clips because the M1 Garand was the standard service rifle.

TAEAB = 384 cartridges .30-06 AP M2, 8-round en-bloc clips in bandoleers (6 clips / 48 rounds), 4 bandoleers per metal M20 ammo can (192 rounds), 2 × M20 ammo cans per wooden M22 crate. Gross Weight: 39.2 lbs. Volume: 0.76 cubic feet.
TAEGA = 384 cartridges .30-06 Ball M2, 8-round en-bloc clips in bandoleers (6 clips / 48 rounds), 4 bandoleers per metal M20 ammo can (192 rounds), 2 × M20 ammo cans per wooden M22 crate. Gross Weight: 38 lbs. Volume: 0.76 cubic feet.
TAE## = 768 cartridges .30-06 Ball M2, 8-round en-bloc clips in bandoleers (6 clips / 48 rounds), 8 bandoleers per metal M21 ammo can (384 rounds), 2 × M21 ammo cans per wooden M23 crate. Gross Weight:71 lbs. Volume: 1.2 cubic feet.
T1EXX-5 = 1584 cartridges .30-06 Ball M2, 8-round en-bloc clips in bandoleers (6 clips / 48 rounds), 33 bandoleers per metal 20mm Mk.1 Mod.0 ammo box. Gross Weight:132 lbs. Volume: 1.5 cubic feet. Repacked WW2 ammunition for use by the Navy and Marine Corps. It replaced the wooden large M1917 Ammo Packing Box and M9 crate.

Belted
Note: The symbol for belted or linked 0.30-06 Springfield ammunition was a vertical string of cartridges pointing right. Most early 0.30-'06 machine gun ammunition manufactured during World War II was belted rather than linked due to a steel shortage. All metal-linked ammunition was reserved for the Army Air Force and Naval Aviation. When the US Army Air Force .30-caliber machine gun was superseded by the .50-caliber machine gun mid-war, all .30-caliber ammunition began to be belted in M1 250-round belts for infantry use or M3 100-round woven belts for use in vehicles and tanks. Post-World War II production used linked ammunition.

In a belt with mixture of ammunition types the number and type of rounds per 5- or 10-round segment is used. If different ammunition types were used in the segment, they were alternated (for example, A–B–A–B–C rather than A–A–B–B–C), with the tracer round (C) at the end. Usually one round in five or ten was tracer, to show the gunner the trajectory; pre-War belts used a 1-in-10 mix and War and Post-War belts used a 1-in-5 mix.

T1ECT = 1,500 cartridges .30-06 linked (4 × AP M2, 1 × TR M1) 250-rounds in M1 links in a carton, 6 cartons per metal-lined wooden chest M1917. Volume: 1.5 cubic feet.
T1EDP = 1,000 cartridges .30-06 belted (4 × AP M2, 1 × TR M1), Grade MG, 250-round M1917-belt in metal M1A1 ammo box, 4 × M1A1 ammo boxes per wirebound plywood crate. Gross Weight: 75 lbs. Volume: 1.0 cubic feet.
T1EDP = 1,100 rounds .30-06 linked (4 × AP M2, 1 × TR M1), Grade MG, 275 rounds in M1 links in metal ammo box M1A1, 4 × M1A1 ammo boxes per wirebound plywood crate. Gross Weight: 77 lbs. Volume: 1.0 cubic feet.
T1EED = 250 cartridges .30-06 belted (9 × AP M2, 1 × TR M1), 250-round M1917 web belt in metal M1 ammo box.
T1EED = 275 cartridges .30-06 linked (9 × AP M2, 1 × TR M1) 275 rounds in M1 links in metal M1A1 ammo box.
T1EEF = 1,200 cartridges .30-06 linked (2 × AP M2, 2 × INC M1, 1 × TR M1), 100 rounds in M1-links in a carton, 12 cartons per metal-lined wooden M1917 ammunition chest. Gross Weight: 106 lbs. Volume: 1.5 cubic feet.
T1EGW = 250 cartridges .30-06 belted (4 × Ball M2, 1 × TR M1), Grade MG, 1 × 250-round M1917-belt per metal M1 or M1A1 ammo box.
T1EGW = 275 rounds .30-06 linked (4 × Ball M2, 1 × TR M1), Grade AC, 275 rounds in M1 links per metal M1A1 ammo box. Repacked linked ammunition.
T1EHC = 250 cartridges .30-06 belted (9 × Ball M2, 1 × TR M1), 1 × 250-round M917 web belt per metal M1 ammo box.
T1EHC = 275 rounds .30-06 linked (9 × Ball M2, 1 × TR M1), 275 rounds in M1 links per metal M1A1 ammo box.
T1EHD = 1,500 cartridges .30-06 belted (4 × Ball M2, 1 × TR M1), 1 × 250-round M1917 web belt in a carton, 6 cartons per metal-lined wooden M1917 ammunition chest. Gross Weight: 111 lbs. Volume: 1.5 cubic feet.
T1EHD = 1,000 cartridges .30-06 belted (4 × Ball M2, 1 × TR M1), 1 × 250-round M1917-belt per metal M1 ammo can, 4 × M1 ammo cans per wire-bound plywood crate. Gross Weight: 75 lbs. Volume: 0.8 cubic feet. Repacked ammo repackaged in M1 ammo cans.
T1EHD = 1,000 cartridges .30-06 linked (4 × Ball M2, 1 × TR M1), 250-rounds in M1 links per metal M1 ammo can, 4 × M1 ammo cans per wire-bound plywood crate. Gross Weight: 75 lbs. Volume: 1.0 cubic feet. Repacked ammo transferred to links and repackaged in M1A1 ammo cans.
T1EHR = 480 cartridges .30-06 linked (4 × Ball M2, 1 × TR M1), 120 rounds in M1 links, 1 linked belt per carton, 2 cartons per M8 ammo can (240 rounds), 2 × M8 ammo cans per M9 wooden crate. Gross Weight: 45 lbs. Volume: 0.7 cubic feet.
T1EMB = 1,000 cartridges .30-06 belted (4 × Ball M2, 1 × TR M1), 1 × 250-round M1917 web belt per metal M1 ammo box, 4 × M1 ammo boxes per wirebound plywood crate. Gross Weight: 93 lbs. Volume: 1.0 cubic feet.
T1ENB = 1,000 cartridges .30-06 linked (4 × Ball M2, 1 × TR M1), 1 × 250-round linked belt per metal M1 ammo box, 4 × M1 ammo boxes per wirebound plywood crate. Gross Weight: 93 lbs. Volume: 1.0 cubic feet.

==== Class T1I (Caliber .50) ====
There were three grades of cartridges, based on accuracy and reliability. "AC" (Aircraft) the highest, came in metal linked belts and was suitable for aircraft and Anti-Aircraft machine-guns. "MG" (Machine Gun) came in woven cloth or metal-link belts and was suitable for use in ground machine-guns. Class 3 (Unsuitable) was rejected as being under standards and was destroyed.

Cartons (1939–1948)

T1IAA = 120 cartridges .50 Armor-Piercing M2, in 10-round cartons, 6 cartons per M10 ammo can (60 rounds), 2 × M10 cans per M12 wooden crate. Volume: 0.7 cubic feet.
T1IBB = 350 cartridges .50 AP M2 in 10-round cartons, 35 Cartons per wooden chest M1917. Gross Weight: 112 lbs. Volume: 1.5 cubic feet.
T1IBS = 240 cartridges .50 AP M2 in 10-round cartons, 6 cartons per waxed cardboard box (60 rounds), 4 × waxed cardboard boxes per wooden crate. Gross Weight: 77 lbs. Volume: 1.2 cubic feet.
T1IDC = 350 cartridges .50 AP-Incendiary M8, Grade AC, in 10-round cartons, in wooden chest M1917. Gross Weight: 110 lbs. Volume: 1.5 cubic feet.
T1IDD = 350 cartridges .50 API M8, in 10-round cartons, in wooden chest M1917. Gross Weight: 107 lbs. Volume: 1.5 cubic feet.
T1IDQ = 120 cartridges .50 API M8, in 10-round cartons, 6 cartons per M10 ammo can (60 rounds), 2 × M10 cans per M12 wooden crate. Gross Weight: 42 lbs. Volume: 0.7 cubic feet.
T1IDR = 120 cartridges .50 API M8, in 10-round cartons, 6 cartons per M10 ammo can (60 rounds), 2 × M10 cans per M12 wooden crate. Gross Weight: 42 lbs. Volume: 0.7 cubic feet.
T1IFB = 350 cartridges .50 Ball M1, in 10-round cartons, in wooden chest M1917. Volume: 1.5 cubic feet.
T1IGB = 350 cartridges .50 Ball M2, in 10-round cartons, in wooden chest M1917. Gross Weight: 109 lbs. Volume: 1.5 cubic feet.
T1IGH = 350 cartridges .50 Ball M2, in 10-round cartons, in wooden chest M1917. Gross Weight: 110 lbs. Volume: 1.5 cubic feet.
T1IGT = 120 cartridges .50 Ball M2, in 10-round cartons, 6 cartons per M10 ammo can, 2 × M10 ammo cans per M12 wooden crate. Gross Weight: 44 lbs. Volume: 0.7 cubic feet.
T1IKA = 350 cartridges .50 Incendiary M1, in 10-round cartons, in wooden chest M1917. Volume: 1.5 cubic feet.
T1IKC = 240 cartridges .50 Incendiary M1, in 10-round cartons, 12 cartons per waxed cardboard box (120 rounds), 2 × waxed cardboard boxes per T2 wooden crate (240 rounds). Gross Weight: 75 lbs. Volume: 1.12 cubic feet.
T1IPB = 350 cartridges .50 Tracer M1, in 10-round cartons, in wooden chest M1917. Volume: 1.5 cubic feet.
T1IPI = 120 cartridges .50 Tracer M1, in 10-round cartons, 6 cartons per M10 ammo can, 2 × M10 ammo cans per M12 wooden crate. Gross Weight: 43 lbs. Volume: 0.7 cubic feet.

Cartons (1948–1958)

TAIJA = 240 cartridges .50 API-Tracer M20, in 10-round cartons, 24 cartons per metal-lined wooden crate. Gross Weight: 82 lbs. Volume: 1.2 cubic feet.

Belted (1939–1948)
Note: The symbol for belted or linked 0.50-caliber BMG ammunition was a diagonal string of cartridges pointing from the lower left corner to the upper right corner. The type of ammunition was indicated by a code letter prefixed to the ammunition's Lot Number. "B" stood for Belted (woven cloth belt) and "L" stood for Linked (disintegrating metal links).
Due to a steel shortage, linked belts were originally reserved for the Army Air Force and Naval Aviation. Machine gun ammunition for ground use was supplied in 110-round M7 woven belts for infantry and 50-round woven belts for vehicles and tanks. After the Allies achieved air superiority over Europe around the fall of 1944, linked rounds began being issued to ground units.
In a belt with a mixture of ammunition types the number and type of rounds per 5- or 10-round segment is used. If different ammunition types were used in the segment, they were usually alternated (for example, A-B-A-B-C rather than A-A-B-B-C), with the tracer round (C) at the end. Usually one in five or one in ten cartridges were tracer.

T1IBA = 300 cartridges .50 linked (Ball M2).
T1IBW = 265 cartridges .50 linked (AP M2), in metal-lined wooden chest M1917. Gross Weight: 100 lbs. Volume: 1.5 cubic feet.
T1ICA = 265 cartridges .50 linked (2 × AP M2, 2 × Incendiary M1, 1 × Tracer M1), in metal-lined wooden chest M1917. Gross Weight: 106 lbs. Volume: 1.5 cubic feet.
T1ICC = 265 cartridges .50 linked (2 × AP M2, 2 × Incendiary M1, 1 × Tracer M1), in metal-lined wooden chest M1917. Gross Weight: 100 lbs. Volume: 1.5 cubic feet.
T1ICE = 265 cartridges .50 linked (4 × AP M2, 1 × Tracer M1) in metal-lined wooden chest M1917. Volume: 1.5 cubic feet.
T1ICJ = 240 cartridges .50 linked (AP M2) in 60-round cartons, in metal-lined wooden chest M1917. Gross Weight: 90 lbs. Volume: 1.5 cubic feet.
T1ICN = 220 cartridges .50 belted (2 × AP M2, 2 × INC M1, 1 × TR M1), 110 belted rounds in metal M2 ammo box, 2 × M2 ammo boxes per wooden crate. Gross Weight: 71 lbs. Volume: 0.93 Cubic Feet.
T1ICQ = 210 cartridges .50 linked (2 × AP M2, 2 × INC M1, 1 × TR M1), Aircraft (AC) grade, 105 linked rounds in metal M2 ammo box, 2 × M2 ammo boxes per wooden crate. Volume: 0.93 Cubic Feet.
T1ICR = 210 cartridges .50 linked (2 × AP M2, 2 × INC M1, 1 × TR M1), Machinegun (MG) grade, 105 linked rounds in metal M2 ammo box, 2 × M2 ammo boxes per wooden crate. Volume: 0.93 Cubic Feet.
T1ICW = 240 cartridges .50 linked (AP M2), in 60-round cartons, in metal-lined wooden chest M1917. Gross Weight: 95 lbs. Volume: 1.5 cubic feet.
T1IDH = 265 cartridges .50 linked (2 × API M8, 2 × Incendiary M1, 1 × Tracer M10), in wooden chest M1917. Volume: 1.5 cubic feet.
T1IDO = 110 cartridges .50 linked (2 × AP M2, 2 × INC M1, 1 × TR M1), 55 linked rounds in metal M10 ammo can, 2 × M10 ammo cans per M12 wooden crate. Gross Weight: 42 lbs. Volume: 0.7 cubic feet.
T1IDP = 210 cartridges .50 linked (4 × AP M2, 1 × TR M1), 105 linked rounds in metal M2 ammo box, 2 × M2 ammo boxes per wooden crate. Volume: 0.93 Cubic Feet.
T1IDS = 110 cartridges .50 linked (2 × AP-I M8, 2 × INC M1, 1 TR M10), 55 linked rounds in metal M10 ammo can, 2 × M10 ammo cans per M12 wooden crate. Gross Weight: 44 lbs. Volume: 0.7 cubic feet.
T1IFC = 210 cartridges .50 linked (Ball M1), 105 rounds per metal ammo box M2, 2 × M2 ammo boxes per wooden crate. Volume: 0.93 Cubic Feet.
T1IFW = 210 cartridges .50 linked (4 × Ball M33, 1 × TR M17), 105 rounds per metal ammo box M2, 2 × M2 ammo boxes per wooden crate. Volume: 0.93 Cubic Feet.
T1IGD = 265 cartridges .50 linked (4 × Ball M2, 1 × TR M1), in wooden chest M1917. Volume: 1.5 cubic feet.
T1IGO = 265 cartridges .50 linked (Ball M2) in wooden chest M1917. Gross Weight: 97 lbs. Volume: 1.5 cubic feet.
T1IGR = 240 cartridges .50 linked (Ball M2), in 60-round cartons, in wooden chest M1917. Gross Weight: 93 lbs. Volume: 1.5 cubic feet.
T1IGV = 240 cartridges .50 linked (Ball M2), in 60-round cartons, in wooden chest M1917. Volume: 1.5 cubic feet.
T1IIH = 265 cartridges .50 linked (2 × API M8, 2 × Incendiary M1, 1 × Tracer M10), in wooden chest M1917. Gross Weight: 99 lbs. Volume: 1.5 cubic feet.
T1IIJ = 110 cartridges .50 linked (API M8), 55 linked rounds per carton, 1 carton per M10 ammo can, 2 × M10 ammo cans per M12 wooden crate. Gross Weight: 44 lbs. Volume: 0.7 cubic feet.
T1IIM = 110 cartridges .50 linked (4 × API M8, 1 × INC M1), 55 linked rounds per carton, 1 carton per M10 ammo can, 2 × M10 ammo cans per M12 wooden crate. Gross Weight: 44 lbs. Volume: 0.7 cubic feet.
T1IIN = 265 cartridges .50 linked (2 × API M8, 2 × Incendiary M1, 1 × API-T M20), bulk-packed in wooden chest M1917. Volume: 1.5 cubic feet.
T1IIT = 330 cartridges .50 linked (2 × API M8, 2 × Incendiary M1, 1 × API-T M20). 55 linked rounds per carton, 1 carton per M10 ammo can, 3 × M10 ammo cans (165 linked rounds) per rectangular cardboard box, 2 vertically-stacked cardboard boxes per Navy metal 20mm Mk.1 Mod.0 ammo box. Volume: 1.6 cu. ft. Gross Weight: 130 lbs.
T1IIW = 265 cartridges .50 linked (4 × API M8, 1 × API-T M20), bulk-packed in wooden chest M1917. Gross Weight: 96 lbs. Volume: 1.5 cubic feet.
T1IMM = 110 cartridges .50 linked (4 × Ball M2, 1 × Tracer M1), 55 linked rounds per carton, 1 carton per M10 ammo can, 2 × M10 ammo cans per M12 wooden crate. Volume: 0.7 cubic feet.
T1IMQ = 110 cartridges .50 linked (4 × Ball M2, 1 × Tracer M17), 55 linked rounds per carton, 1 carton per M10 ammo can, 2 × M10 ammo cans per M12 wooden crate. Gross Weight: 44 lbs. Volume: 0.7 cubic feet.

Belted (1948–1958)

TAIGC = 224 cartridges .50 linked (API M8), 112 linked rounds per carton, 1 carton per M21 ammo can, 2 × M21 ammo cans per M23 wooden crate (224 rounds). Gross Weight: 83 lbs. Volume: 1.2 cubic feet.
TAIFW = 210 cartridges .50 linked (4 × Ball M33, 1 × TR M17), 105 linked rounds per carton, 2 cartons per wooden crate. Gross Weight: 80 lbs. Volume: 1.07 Cubic Feet.

==== Class T1J (Class T1 Defective Ammunition) ====
Details ammunition that was Class 3 (Unserviceable). All Unserviceable ammunition was to be destroyed but was sometimes used for training. (For instance, a failed batch of accurate Tracer ammo with a defective tracer element could be used as regular ball ammo.)

T1JAA = 265 cartridges .50 linked Tracer M1 (Defective), 1 x 265-round belt in wooden chest M1917. Gross Weight: 110 lbs. Volume: 1.5 cu.ft. [Note: Not for use for overhead fire. Substitute for Ball ammunition.]
T1JDA = 265 cartridges .50 linked Tracer M1 (4 Tracer (Defective) : 1 Tracer M1 (Serviceable)); in wooden chest M1917. Gross Weight: 110 lbs. Volume: 1.5 cu.ft. [Note: Not for use for overhead fire. Substitute for Ball ammunition.]

==== Class T1L (Experimental Ammunition) ====
The .60 cartridge [15.2 x 114mm T17] was designed for use with the experimental .60-caliber T17 Machine Gun, a reverse-engineered version of the German MG151 cannon chambered for an experimental .60 anti-tank rifle round. The project was abandoned after the war. The .60 cartridge case was the basis for the 20mm Vulcan [20x102mm] autocannon shell.

T1LAA = 100 cartridges .60 T32 Ball in cartons, 10 rounds per carton, 10 cartons per wooden chest M1917. Gross Weight: 78 lbs. Volume: 1.5 Cubic Feet.
T1LHC = 60 cartridges .60 T39 Armor-Piercing Incendiary in cartons, 10 rounds per carton, 6 cartons per wooden crate. Gross Weight: 45 lbs. Volume: 0.7 Cubic Feet.

==== Class T1U (Class T1 Blank Ammunition) ====
T1UAK = 1480 cartridges .30-06 Blank M1909, in 5-round clips in 20-round cartons, in cardboard boxes (740 rounds), in wooden crate. Gross Weight: 67 lbs. Volume: 1.1 cubic feet.
T1UAL = 1480 cartridges .30-06 Blank M1909, in 20-round cartons?, in M1917 wooden crate with terneplate liner. Gross Weight: ? lbs. Volume: 1.5 cubic feet.
T1UCC = 150 linked cartridges .50 Blank T-40, in wooden crate.

==== Class T1V (Class T1 "Dummy" Ammunition) ====
T1VAE = 960 cartridges .30-06 Dummy M1906, in 5-round clips in 20-round cartons, 12 cartons in metal ammo can M8 (240 rounds), 4 × M8 ammo cans per wooden crate.
T1VGC = 350 cartridges .50 Dummy M2, in 10-round cartons, in wooden chest M1917. Volume: 1.5 Cubic Feet.

=== Sub-group T2 (Ammunition for Revolver, Pistol and Submachinegun) ===
Pistol ammunition came in three grades. Grade 1 was suitable for revolvers and pistols, Grade 2 was suitable for pistols and submachine guns, and Grade 3 was Unsuitable for use.

==== Class T2A (.45 ACP) ====
Ammunition with an "-XC" code letter suffix to its Lot Number was made with steel cases rather than brass and a gilding-metal jacketed bullet. This was a wartime economy measure to conserve copper and zinc. They were made entirely at the Evansville Chrysler (EC) and Evansville Chrysler Sunbeam (ECS) ammunition plant in Evansville, Indiana.

T2AAA = 2,000 Cartridges, .45 ACP Ball M1911, in 20-round Cartons, 100 cartons per metal-lined small M1917 Wooden Packing Box (2,000 rounds). Pre-war 20-round packaging. Gross Weight: 110 lbs. Volume: 0.92 Cubic Feet.
T2AAA = 2,000 Cartridges, .45 ACP Ball M1911, in 50-round Cartons, 40 cartons per small metal-lined M1917 Wooden Packing Box (2,000 rounds). Changed to 50-round packaging in January, 1942 to make it quicker to distribute ammunition. Gross Weight: 107 lbs. Volume: 0.92 Cubic Feet.
T2AAD = 1,800 Cartridges, .45 ACP Ball M1911, in 50-round Cartons, 18 cartons per T1 waxed cardboard box (900 rounds), 2 × vertically-stacked T1 boxes per T4 packing box (1800 rounds). Created in 1942 to make it easier to open and unpack ammunition. The waterproof wax coating was found to be ineffective and sea salt-air and moisture caused the steel-cased ammunition to corrode. Gross Weight: 92 lbs. Volume: 0.74 Cubic Feet.
T2AAF = 1,200 Cartridges, .45 ACP Ball M1911, in 50-round Cartons, 12 cartons per metal M5 ammo can (600 rounds), 2 × M5 ammo cans per M3 wooden crate (1200 rounds). Created in 1943 to replace the T2AAD crate. Gross Weight: 67 lbs. Volume: 0.644 Cubic Feet.
T2AAM = 1,200 Cartridges, .45 ACP Ball M1911, in 50-round Cartons, 12 cartons per metal M20 ammo can (600 rounds), 2 × M20 ammo cans per M22 wooden crate (1200 rounds). Created in 1948? to replace the T2AAF crate. Gross Weight: 68 lbs. Volume: 0.75 Cubic Feet.
T2AAP = 3,600 Cartridges, .45 ACP Ball M1911, in 50-round Cartons, 12 cartons per M5 Ammo Can, 3 M5 Ammo Cans per rectangular cardboard box, 2 horizontally-stacked cardboard boxes per metal 20mm Mk.1 Mod.0 ammo box. Used by the Navy and Marine Corps starting in 1943 to replace the small and large M1917 wooden packing boxes. Gross Weight: 200 lbs. Volume: 1.5 Cubic Feet.

==== Class T2B (.38 Caliber) ====
.38 Special was for use in Colt Commando revolvers. The Commando was issued by the US Army to Military Police and Counter-Intelligence Corps personnel. On the home front the Commando was issued to armed security guards at government facilities and factories that were either drawn from the State Guards or were deputized as "auxiliary Military Police".
.38 Smith & Wesson was for use in British service revolvers like the Lend-Lease Smith & Wesson Victory Model and British .38/200 Enfield No. 2 and Webley Mk VI. Ammunition was civilian market production, used commercial markings (headstamp over caliber), and came in commercial packaging with colored ink printing (marked "U.S. Property").
.38 Super Auto was procured by the Office of Strategic Services in 1945 for use in Colt "Super .38" M1911A1 pistols. Remington Arms only made three contract lots (with the civilian headstamp RAC-UMC / .38 ACP): RA 5001, RA 5002 and RA 5003. They were packed in military chipboard cartons and packed in M10 spam cans in M3 crates. The Colt .38 Super Auto cartridge was a high-powered version of the .38 ACP Ball cartridge designed to defeat body armor or penetrate vehicle bodies. It was used by the FBI against bank robbers and gangsters in the 1930s. Due to the end of World War Two occurring shortly after procurement, none of the pistols were ever issued or saw combat use.

T2BAA = 2,000 Cartridges, .38 Special - Ball (158-grain), in 50-round cartons. 40 cartons per wooden shipping crate with tarpaper lining. Gross Weight: 73 lbs. Volume: 0.57 Cubic Feet.
T2BBA = 2,000 Cartridges, .38 Smith & Wesson - Ball (70-grain), in 50-round cartons. 40 cartons per wooden shipping crate with tarpaper lining. Volume: 0.57 Cubic Feet.
T2BCA = 2,000 Cartridges, .38 Smith & Wesson - Ball (146-grain), in 50-round cartons. 40 cartons per wooden shipping crate with tarpaper lining. Volume: 0.57 Cubic Feet.
T2BDA = 2,000 Cartridges, .38 Special - Ball (148-grain), in 50-round cartons. 40 cartons per wooden shipping crate with tarpaper lining. Volume: 0.57 Cubic Feet.
T2BIA = 1,800 Cartridges, .38 Super Auto - Ball (130-grain), in 50-round cartons. 18 cartons per M10 spam can (900 rounds). 2 M10 cans per M12 crate. Gross Weight: 64 lbs. Volume: 0.7 Cubic Feet.

==== Class T2C (9-mm Caliber) ====
T2CAA = 9×19mm Parabellum, in 50-round cartons. wooden shipping crate with tarpaper lining.

==== Class T2V (Class T2 "Dummy" Ammunition) ====
T2VAC = 1,200 Cartridges, .45 ACP Dummy M1921, in 50-round Cartons, 12 cartons per M5 ammunition can (600 rounds), 2 × M5 ammo cans per M3 wooden crate. Volume: 0.75 Cubic Feet.

=== Sub-group T3 (Shells for Shotgun) ===
Guard shells (No. 4 Birdshot with a brass base or partial brass case and a paper hull) were used by sentries and military police. Combat shells (00 Buckshot with a partial or full brass case) were used by frontline troops. Sporting shells (No. 6 or No. 8 Birdshot with a brass base and paper hull) were used for competition trap shooting and hunting game. Chilled shot was ammunition manufactured by dropping measured drops of hot lead from the top of a tall structure (called a "shot tower") into a tub of cold water below; it was denser and harder than regular lead shot.

==== Class T3A (12 Gauge 2.75" Shell) ====
Note = Shells were also bought in commercial 500-shell wooden packing boxes that only had the manufacturer's markings on them.
T3ABD = 675 Shells, Shotgun, 12 Gauge, No.00 Buckshot, in 25-shell cartons. 27 cartons per wooden M1917 ammunition packing box. Gross Weight: 98 lbs. Volume: 1.5 cubic feet.
T3ABE = 600 Shells, Shotgun, 12 Gauge, No.00 Buckshot, in 25-shell cartons. 24 cartons per wooden M1917 ammunition packing box. Gross Weight: 90 lbs. Volume: 1.5 cubic feet.
T3AGA = 500 Shells, Shotgun, 12 Gauge, No.8 Chilled Shot, in 25-shell cartons. 20 cartons per wooden commercial packing box. Gross Weight: 56.5 lbs. Volume: 0.75 cubic feet.
T3AGD = 675 Shells, Shotgun, 12 Gauge, No.8 Chilled Shot, in 25-shell cartons. 27 cartons per wooden M1917 ammunition packing box. Gross Weight: 94 lbs. Volume: 1.5 cubic feet.
T3AGE = 360 Shells, Shotgun, 12 Gauge, No.8 Chilled Shot, in 10-shell cartons. 12 cartons per M10 metal ammo can (120 shells). 3 × M10 ammo cans per M15 wooden crate. Gross Weight: 55 lbs. Volume: 0.9 Cubic Feet.
T3AUD = 240 Shells, Shotgun, 12 Gauge, No.8 Chilled Shot, Paper Cased, in 10-shell cartons. 12 cartons per M10 metal ammo can (120 shells). 2 × M10 ammo cans per M12 wooden crate.
T3AWD = 360 Shells, Shotgun, 12 Gauge, No. 4 Chilled Shot, in 10-shell cartons, 12 cartons per M10 metal ammo can (120 shells). 3 × M10 ammo cans per M15 wooden crate. Gross Weight: 55 lbs. Volume: 0.9 Cubic Feet.

==== Class T3G (.410 Gauge 3" Shell M35) ====
The M35 was a special .410 Bore shell with a full brass case used in compact survival weapons.

T3GAA = 450 Shells, Shotgun, .410 Gauge M35, No.6 Shot, in 25-shell cartons in waterproof envelopes, 18 cartons per wooden chest. Gross Weight: 31 lbs. Volume: 0.35 cubic feet.

=== Sub-group T6 (Ammunition for obsolete and non-standard small arms) ===
==== Class T6L (.300 Holland & Holland Magnum) ====
Used in Winchester Model 70 Bull Gun rifles for long-distance target shooting at Camp Perry matches from 1936 to 1971(?). The original British loading used cordite and had the same muzzle velocity and power as the .30-06 Springfield. American-made Match-grade ammunition was loaded with IMR powder that allowed heavier bullets and higher velocities.

T6LAA = .300 Magnum Ball (180-grain Full Metal Jacketed Boat-Tailed bullet) cartridges (Grade R), 50 x 20-round cartons (1000 rounds), commercial wooden crate lined with tarpaper. Gross Weight: 39.8 lbs Volume: ?

==== 8mm Lebel Rifle ====
8 mm Lebel Rifle = 1120 rounds, 8mm Lebel Rifle Ball, in 20-round cartons, 56 cartons per M1917 Wooden Packing Crate. Gross Weight: ? Volume: 1.5 cubic feet.

== See also ==
- Standard Nomenclature List US Army (1920s to 1958).
- MIL-STD -1168
- Federal Stock Number / National Stock Number
- GRAU Indeks (Glavnoye Raketno-Artilleriyskoye Upravleniye Indeks; "Main Rocket-and-Artillery Directorate Index").
