= Camp Perry =

Ohio National Guard base

Coordinates: 41°32′28″N 83°01′18″W

- Erie Township, Ottawa County, near Port Clinton, Ohio
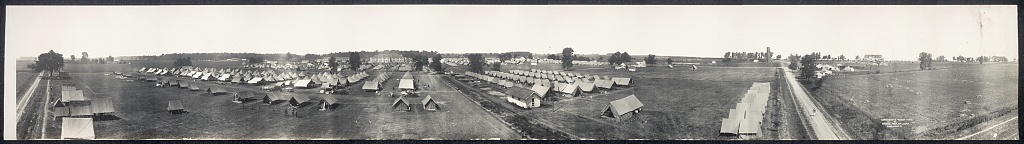
- 1913 panorama view

Site information
- Type: Training facility
- Controlled by: Ohio National Guard

Site history
- Built: 1909
- In use: 1909–present

Garrison information
- Garrison: 213th Ordnance Company; 372d Missile Maintenance Company; 200th Red Horse Civil Engineering Squadron (ANG); Ohio Naval Militia; Ohio Military Reserve; Port Security Unit 309

Camp Perry is a National Guard training facility located on the shore of Lake Erie in northern Ohio near Port Clinton. In addition to its regular mission as a military training base, Camp Perry also boasts the second largest outdoor rifle range in the world after the NRA Whittington Center in Raton, New Mexico. The firing is done in the direction of the open water of the lake, that lies just beyond an earthen berm and the targets.

== History ==
The original land for Camp Perry was purchased in 1906, and the reservation was named after Commodore Oliver Hazard Perry, the American naval commander who won the Battle of Put-in-Bay during the War of 1812. Rudimentary structures were constructed for use by competitors in the National Matches, and for transient military personnel. During World War I, Camp Perry served as a training center for Army officers and marksmanship instructors. Around 1918 an additional area immediately adjacent to the existing Camp Perry grounds was used to construct the Erie Army Depot for artillery ordnance storage.

In the 1920s, the facility was by the Special Police School, a tactical training facility established by the National Rifle Association and the Army's National Board for the Promotion of Rifle Practice. Dubbed "Hogan's Alley," the Special Police School consisted of...

several sham buildings erected on the target line, to represent a street in a slum section of a town. There are, of course, numerous doors and windows, and there are chimneys, etc. behind which gangsters might be supposed to be lurking. The officer then walks down the street, with his gun loaded.... As each figure appears in some unexpected place, the officer fires at it."

In 1924, the police departments of all cities with populations of over 10,000 were invited to participate in national matches at Camp Perry.

The coming of the Second World War closed the Special Police School down, and Camp Perry served as a POW camp for German and Italian prisoners. The Italian prisoners were very lightly guarded and worked alongside the civilians at the camp. They were also used as workers at various local industries and returned to the camp each night. The camp was used to test the longevity of artillery weapons. The gun barrels were measured with a very precise gauge. The guns were then fired into Lake Erie and retested to determine the amount of wear the rounds of firing caused. This enabled the Army to estimate the effective life of the weapon. (Note: A Wikipedia contributor's mother worked at Camp Perry during World War II, and told her child stories of her interactions with the prisoners: "She operated a star gauge to measure the barrels. A busload of Italian prisoners would arrive at the basket factory behind our home for work each day. They were guarded by one soldier with a rifle who lounged most of the day.")

After the war prisoner quarters were converted back to use by transient personnel who were at Perry for training. In 1946 Ohio Governor Frank Lausche considered turning the camp into a college temporarily. The camp was used extensively for several years after World War II, and in 1956 the Special Police School was re-opened, but use slowed somewhat during the 1960s. The Erie Army Depot closed in the mid-1960s and was eventually converted to industrial use. However, many of Camp Perry's original structures are still in use in one form or another.

On June 24, 1998, a tornado damaged several buildings on the grounds.

== Present use ==
Currently, Camp Perry is home to the 213th Ordnance Company (Missile Support, Corps), the 372d Missile Maintenance Company (DS) Detachment 1, the 200th RED HORSE Civil Engineering Squadron (Ohio Air National Guard), U.S. Coast Guard Port Security Unit 309, the Ohio Naval Militia (the naval arm of Ohio's State Defense Forces), and the Ohio Military Reserve (the militia arm of Ohio's State Defense Forces).

== Civilian Marksmanship Program ==
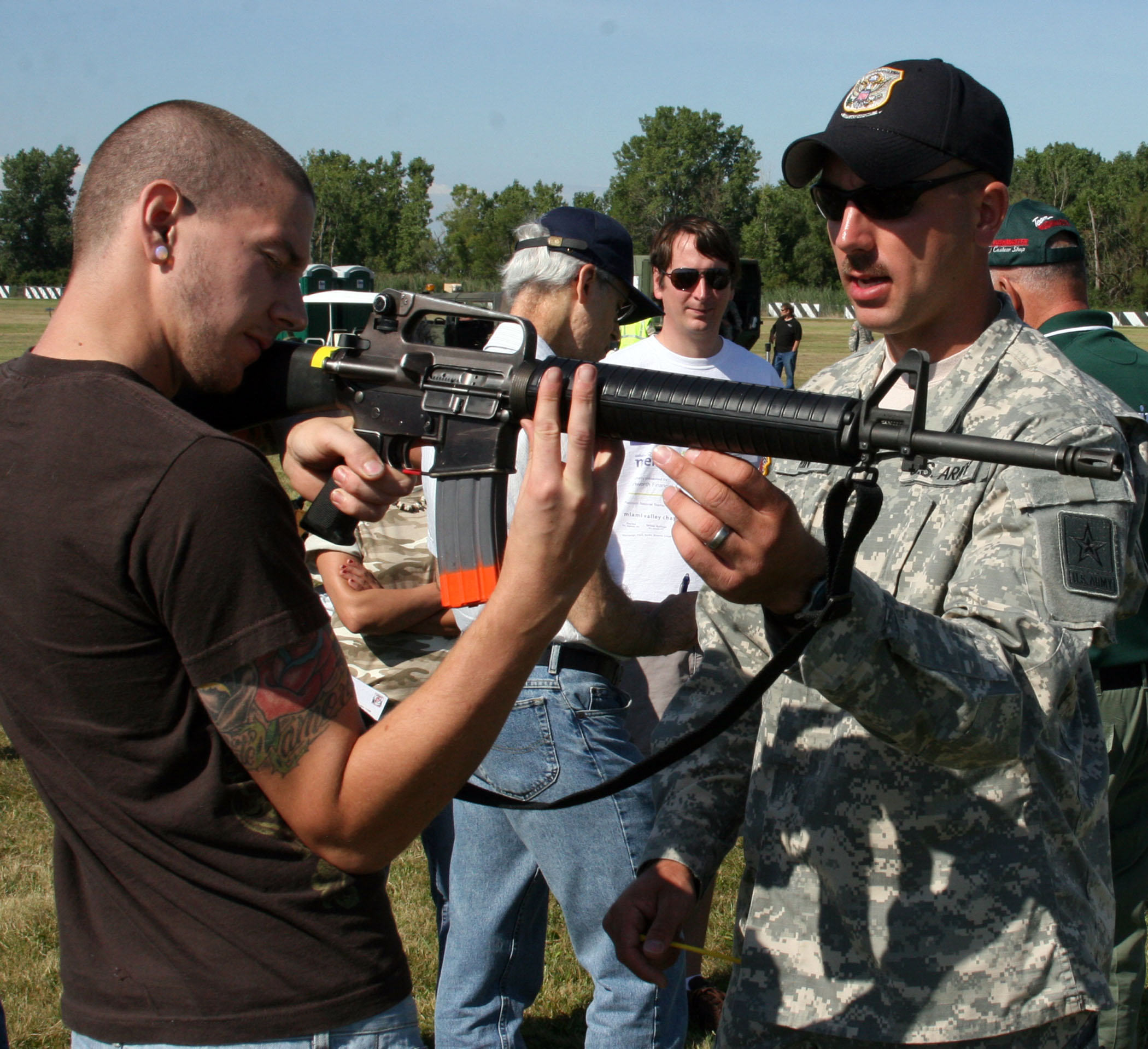
Spc. Joseph Hein, U.S. Army Marksmanship Unit, instructs a student on the intricacies of the M-16A2 rifle during the Small Arms Firing School, Aug. 1, 2009 at Camp Perry, Ohio.

Camp Perry has been the host of the Civilian Marksmanship Program (CMP) and the NRA-sponsored National Rifle Matches since 1907. The National Matches, considered America's "World Series of the Shooting Sports," attracts shooting sports competitors from all across the world to compete in matches of all multitudes. Competition event shooters range from beginners to the world’s best. The National Matches include Small Arms Firing Schools, a series of CMP National Trophy Rifle and Pistol Matches, CMP Games Events and NRA national championships. The National Matches are conducted through a partnership with the CMP, the Ohio National Guard and the NRA.

The camp is home to the Small Arms Firing School, which provides shooters with expert training and facilities for improving their shooting ability. The Small Arms Firing School was first conducted by The Department of Defense as part of the National Matches at the camp in 1918. Now there are over one thousand pistol and rifle shooters a year that take part in firearms safety and fundamental marksmanship skills. The Pistol and Rifle Schools are conducted by the U. S. Army Marksmanship Unit (USAMU). The Schools are open to all United States citizens who are over the minimum age. USAMU instructors, assisted by Army, Air Force, Coast Guard, Marine Corps and Navy Active, National Guard and Army Reserve shooting team members teach basic marksmanship techniques to the new and less experienced, and experienced shooters who want to learn new ways to improve their scores. Camp Perry is also home to the Civilian Marksmanship Program's north office.

== See also ==
- National Rifle Association of the United Kingdom
- Shooting sport
- Wimbledon Cup
