= MIL-STD-1168 =

The MIL-STD-1168 is a set of standard codes used to identify munitions (ammunition, explosives and propellants). It was designed to replace the previous confusing Ammunition Identification Code (AIC) system used by the United States Army Ordnance Department.

The purpose of lot numbering ammunition items and creation of ammunition data cards as outlined herein is to provide the identification of homogeneous materiel necessary to ensure accurate control of items during development and experimental stages; during movement of items from production line to production line, from plant to plant, from plant to storage facilities; while at test facility or in the field; for issue to the using services; to enable the proper establishment and maintenance of surveillance records; and to provide a means for properly identifying materiel when withdrawal of defective, deteriorated, hazardous or obsolete ammunition and energetic materiel from service is required. Lot numbering and ammunition data cards also provide documentation and traceability for ammunition lots.

== Pre-Standard Lot Code Format [1942-1965] ==
The format used in the 1940s, 1950's and 1960's was in the format of LLL-NNNN.
In this example, "L" stands for Letter and "N" stands for Number.

The first two or three letters (LL or LLL) were for the Manufacturer's Code. Each manufacturer had a unique code designation.
The digits were the Lot's serial number. This was originally 4 digits long (NNNN). Blocks of serial Lot numbers (like 0001 to 0399) were assigned to each manufacturing plant. The date of production of the lots (and the type and grade of ammunition and its packaging) was tracked by biannual supply bulletin rather than marked on the exterior packaging.

There was confusion at the start from a lack of rigid standards and oversight. Some contractors would use a serial number sequence for each type of ammunition they produced, meaning there would be lots of different ammunition types produced at different times that would have the same lot number. Others grouped ammunition of different types produced at the same time into the same block of lot numbers. This was sorted out by the end of World War Two when more oversight was possible.

In the late war period (1944-1945) there was an overhaul and repacking of pre-war and wartime ammo into improved packaging. The repacked ammo lots were given 5-digit Lot codes (NNNNN) assigned in blocks to each manufacturer. Troops would avoid or refuse to use up older or repacked ammo because it was feared it would misfire or jam. To alleviate this false belief, the term "Repacked" was replaced with the term "Functional" in the early 1950s.

=== Ammunition Crates ===
Ammunition crates were marked with identifying information. The class of ammunition (e.g., Explosives or Small Arms Ammunition) was embossed on the lid. The front panel had the alphanumeric Ammunition Identification Code (used 1942-1958) in the upper right corner, the gross weight in pounds and volume in cubic feet stamped in the lower left corner, and the Lot Code stamped in the lower right corner. The text in the center of the front panel detailed the amount and type of contents the crate contained.

Ammunition types were indicated by colored stripes on pre-war (1920s to 1930s) and early-war (1940s) crates. The colored stripes were duplicated on the cartons of ammunition inside them. Packing types (cartons, clips in bandoleers, and belted or linked machinegun ammunition) were indicated by pictograms.

==== Ammunition Packing Codes ====
The ammunition packing type (clipped, belted, or linked) was designated by manufacturers with an extra code letter. It was either added as a letter code between the Manufacturer's Code and the Interfix Number or as a prefix or suffix to the Lot Sequence Number.

- Ammunition in clips (loaded in clips and packed in either cartons or bandoleers) was designated with a "C" (e.g., WRA-01-C1234). This was for rifle ammunition that met standards (Grade 1 or Grade R). It was used in rifles and light machineguns.
- Belted ammunition (loaded into a cloth ammo belt) was designated with a "B" (e.g., LC-01-B1234). This was usually for rifle ammunition that met minimum standards for accuracy (Grade 2 or Grade MG). It was used in medium and heavy machineguns.
- Linked ammunition (loaded into a disintegrating metal link ammo belt) was designated with an "L" (e.g., FA-01-L1234). This was for rifle and heavy machinegun ammunition that met standards (Grade 1 or Grade AC/R) and had a higher standard of reliability. It was used in aircraft and anti-aircraft machineguns.

==== Foreign Manufacturers ====
In the 1950s Foreign manufacturers added a letter code prefix to their Lot Sequence Number. When the National Stock Number (NSN) code system replaced the Federal Stock Number (FSN) system, this method was dropped.

- European manufacturers used an E-prefix (e.g., HP-01-E1234 = Hirtenberger Patronenfabriken, Lot 01–1234)
- Japanese manufacturers used a J-prefix (e.g., TS-01-J1234 = Toyo Seiki, Lot 01–1234)
- Korean manufacturers used a K-prefix (e.g., PS-01-K1234 = Poong-San Metal Corporation, Lot 01–1234)
- Nationalist Chinese / Taiwanese manufacturers used a C-prefix (e.g., 58-01-C1234 = Arsenal 58, Lot 01–1234). Taiwanese manufacturers used the Factory or Arsenal number (i.e., Factory 58 used "58") as a Manufacturing Code or cartridge headstamp.

=== Navy Lot Numbers ===
The Navy used a different lot numbering system for explosives, propellants, and pyrotechnics (chemical marking and screening devices and rocket motors): NN-LLL-MMYY

The first part (NN) is the serial number, next the Manufacturer's 2 or 3 letter code, followed by a four digit number that indicates the two-digit month and two-digit year it was manufactured. For example, 123-JOP-0554 means it was Lot 123, made by Joliet Ordnance Plant (JOP) in May 1954.

=== Navy Lot Numbers (1960-1967) ===
For most of the 1960s there was a different system used for smoke grenades: NNN/N - Y/M - NNNN (there is no slash in the actual lot number; it is used here to divide the serial number information into sub-groups). For example, the lot number 1023-65-1234.

NNN/N represents the 3-digit manufacturer code and the number of the production line (e.g., 1023 would be Line 3 at Pine Bluff Arsenal (manufacturer 102)).
Y/M indicates the last digit of the two-digit financial year (which runs July to June) and the one-digit financial bi-monthly code (e.g, 65; the "6" would be 1966 and the "5" would be March/April).
NNNN represents the serial number (e.g., 1234) of the lot.

Financial Year Codes
Previous Calendar Year		Current Calendar Year	
Digit	Month	Digit	Month
1	July/August	4	January/February
2	September/October	5	March/April
3	November/December	6	May/June

==== Navy Manufacturer Codes (1960-1967) ====
- 102 Pine Bluff Arsenal (PBA) - Pine Bluff, AR.
- 103 Rocky Mountain Arsenal (RMA) - Commerce City, CO.
- 201 Ordnance Products Inc. (OPI) - Gardena, CA.
- 202 Unidynamics (UNI) - Dallas, TX.
- 203 Northrup Carolina Inc. (NCI) - Asheville, NC.
- 204 Unidynamics / Phoenix (UNV) - Phoenix, AZ.

== MIL-STD-1168 (Ammunition Lot Numbering) [Published 30 June 1965; 1965-1975] ==
The "Old Standard". This system used two designation codes.

The Federal Stock Number (FSN) was an 11-digit code number (NNNN-NNN-NNNN) indicating the contents and composition of the package. (In this example, "N" stands for Number.)
The first four digits comprise the Federal Stock Composition Group, the Type and Family the item belongs to.

- Small Arms Ammunition (weapons with a bore up to 30mm) are given the FSCG prefix of 1305.
- Heavy Weapons Ammunition (weapons with a bore greater than 30mm) are given the FSCG prefixes of 1310 (30mm through 75mm), 1315 (75mm through 125mm), or 1320 (greater than 125mm).

The 7-digit number that follows (NNN-NNNN) are called Non-Significant Characters, as they are random and have no coded meaning. It is composed of the unique 3-digit interfix number and 4-digit sequence number identifying a stock item.

=== Department of Defense Identification Code ===
The Department of Defense Identification Code (DODIC) is a 4-symbol alphanumeric code designation for a type of item. It starts with 1 or 2 code letters and the remainder is a 2- or 3-digit code number. It indicates an item of supply (e.g., 5.56mm NATO M193 Ball) and its packing sub-unit (e.g., 20-round carton, 10-round clip, or 200-round linked belt). It is used to inform the person ordering or issuing the item what it is and how it is packed so they get what they need.

The Department of Defense Ammunition Code (DODAC or DDAC) is an 8-symbol (7 digits and a letter) hybrid code designation. It uses the munition's four-digit Federal Supply Classification Group (the first four digits of the item's FSN) followed by its alphanumeric DODIC. It is used mostly when filling out ammunition record sheets. This is done to prevent errors and confusion during ammunition transactions.

=== Standard Lot Code (1965-1975) ===
The lot numbers were beginning to get very long and the lot assigning system was becoming complicated. The reform was to reset the lot numbering system and have each plant start from zero. The Lot number is in the format of: LLL-NN-NNNN.
In this example, "L" stands for Letter and "N" stands for Number.

The first two or three letters (LL or LLL) were for the Manufacturer's Code. Each manufacturer had a code designation.

The next two digits were the “Interfix Number”. This indicates the batch the lot was part of, allowing the Lot Sequence Number to be reused later. It is numbered from 01 to 99.

The last digits were the serial number, called the Lot Sequence Number. This could be 4 or more digits long.

For example, let's say the fictional manufacturer Amalgamated Bio-Carbon (code ABC) makes a shipment of 40 x 46mm low-velocity grenade shells. The lot is Interfix Number #12 and the Sequence Number #345. The Lot Code would then be ABC-12-0345.

==== Ammunition Crates ====
Ammunition crates were marked with the FSN and DODIC along the top of the front panel. Early crates from 1942 to 1956 also included the alphanumeric Ammunition Identification Code in the upper right corner. The average weight in pounds (WT or AVG WT) and volume in cubic feet (CU) were stamped in the lower left corner. The Lot Code was stamped in the lower right corner. The text in the center of the front panel detailed the amount and type of contents the crate contained.

==== Ammunition Boxes ====
Each ammunition box was marked with the FSN and DODIC along the upper part of the box. It also was embossed with the ammunition designation and type (i.e., 5.56mm NATO M193 BALL), and there were symbols indicating packing method (linked, clips or cartons; bandoleers or containers).

== MIL-STD-1168A (Ammunition Lot Numbering - Revision A) [Published 28 February 1975; 1975-1998] ==
The "New Standard".

The FSN was replaced on September 30, 1974, by the National Stock Number, a 13-digit code number (NNNN-NN-NNN-NNNN).
The first 4 digits comprise the National Stock Composition Group (NSCG), which indicates the group and class of materials it belongs to.
The next 2 digits are the National Codification Bureau code, the code number for the NATO member nation stocking and producing the item. (For example, the United States uses the NCB codes 00 and 01 and Canada was assigned 20 and 21; the first number was for pre-1975 production and the second for 1975 and later production.)
The 7-digit code number that follows is the unique 3-digit interfix number and 4-digit sequence number of the item.

=== Lot Number ===
The Lot number is in the format of: LL - NN - L - NN - NNNL.
In this example, "L" stands for Letter and "N" stands for Number.

The first section (LL or LLL) is the manufacturer's code, which is two or three letters long.

The second section (NNL) is the date code. This consists of the last two digits of the year of manufacture and a letter suffix indicating the month of production:

Letter	Month	Letter	Month	Letter	Month	Letter	Month
A	January	D	April	G	July	K	October
B	February	E	May	H	August	L	November
C	March	F	June	J	September	M	December

The letter "I" is omitted because it might be mistaken for the numeral "1" or the letter "J". The letter "O" is omitted from alphanumeric codes because it might be mistaken for the numeral "0".

Following the date code is the third section: the Interfix Number (NN), which can be 3 or more digits long. This indicates the batch of material the item belongs to.

The last section is the Lot Sequence Number (NNN-L), which is 4 or more digits long. This is the sequential serial number of the lot.

A single-letter alphabetic suffix may be added to the parent Lot Sequence Number for various reasons. The item may have been made on a different machine or production line than the rest of the batch or a portion of the batch was found defective by quality control. The letters "I" and "O" are omitted because they could be mistaken for the numbers "1" and "0". The letters "E" and "X" were omitted because they could be mistaken for the letter codes for Experimental ammunition lots.

As an example of a lot number would be: FA-77-A-123-0456A. This would mean that contractor Frankfort Arsenal made the item in January, 1977 and that it was rework "A" (i.e. the second portion) of the 456th Item of the 123rd batch. If a second rework (rework "B", or the third portion of the lot) had been performed on the Item, the code would have been FA-77-A-123-0456B (and so on).

==== Explosives Lot Numbers ====
Explosives, propellants, and pyrotechnics (chemical marking and screening devices and rocket motors) use a different lot numbering system: LL/NNNN/MMM/YY (there are no dashes in the actual lot number; they are there to break the lot number into identifiable sub-groups).

LL/NNNN was the Lot number; the letters (LL) are the Lot Interfix and the numbers (NNNN) are the Lot Sequence. The next block of letters are the three-letter Manufacturer's Code (MMM), followed by the two-digit year of production (YY). For example, AB1234HAW76 would be Lot AB1234, made or repacked by Naval Ammunition Depot Hawthorne (HAW) in 1976 (76).

== MIL-STD-1168B (Ammunition Lot Numbering and Ammunition Data Cards - Revision B) [Published 10 June 1998; 1998-2014] ==
This merged the standards for MIL-STD-1167 (Ammunition Data Cards) and MIL-STD-1168 (Ammunition Lot Numbering) into one standard for both systems. Unlike previous iterations that used dashes between the sections, the new system only puts a dash between the Interfix and Lot Sequence numbers. Lot codes are between 13 and 14 symbols long and are in the format of: LLL/NN/L/NNN-NNN.

In this system, the 3-digit Interfix Number would be the key to the Lot Code. It would be used for the same or similar products manufactured at the same time on the same production lines at the same facility. The Interfix Number would be differenced by the 3-digit Lot Sequence numbers set aside for each item.

The system still uses the same 2- or 3-letter Manufacturing Code, 2-digit Year of Production, and alphabetic Month of Production codes. Even if the year or month changes, the Interfix code will still remain the same until its combinations are all used up.

For example, Amalgamated Bio-Carbon (ABC) makes the M1 (Point-Detonating), M2 (Air-Burst), and M3 (Rebounding) fuzes for the 40mm Low Velocity grenade shell. They all have the 123 Lot Interfix number but the Lot Sequence numbers are assigned in alternating blocks. The M1 Grenade shells get Lot Sequence Numbers -001, -004, and -007; the M2 shells get Lot Sequence Numbers -002, -005, and -008; and the M3 shells get Lot Sequence Numbers -003, -006, and -009. The M1 batches would be Lot Coded as ABC99L123-001 (made in November, 1999), ABC99M123-004 (made in December, 1999), and ABC00A123-007 (made in January, 2000). When those items were completed new Lot Sequence numbers in the Interfix series would be assigned.

New Interfix numbers would usually be issued when all combinations of a Lot Interfix's Lot Sequence numbers (001-999) had been used up. They would also be issued for a variety of other reasons:

- If a production line was stopped to be overhauled or updated and an alternate, different, or new production line was used instead.
- If a previous lot was found to be defective or sub-standard and the line was stopped until quality control measures were used to correct the problem.
- If a variant design or improvement was incorporated in the item.
- If an item was declared obsolete or limited standard and further production is to cease.

== MIL-STD-1168C (Ammunition Lot Numbering and Ammunition Data Card - Revision C) [Published 11 March 2014; 2014-present] ==
The Lot Number is now between 13 and 16 symbols long. There are no spaces between symbols in the Lot Number.

The Ammunition Lot Identifier letter is used for non-standard lots of ammunition.

Letter	Lot Type	Description
E	Experimental lot	Small quantities of ammunition items that are produced for Research and Development. Experimental Lot numbers have a "000E" interfix number followed by a Lot Sequence of "001" for the first Lot, "002" for the second Lot, etc.
A	First Article lot	A pre-production lot designed to set up the initial manufacture, sorting and packaging of ammunition items. This is a sort of "shakedown" to eliminate problems and bottlenecks before full production begins. First Article lot numbers have an initial "001A" Interfix number. The first full production lot will have a Lot Number of "001-001".
L	Functional lot	Ammunition of two or more different types that have been repacked (like Ball and Tracer or Armor-Piercing and Armor-Piercing-Incendiary). It is usually small or medium caliber ammunition repacked in belts in containers for use in a belt-fed weapon system.
H	Hybrid lot	A hybrid lot of ammunition is made from surplus components of various interfix numbers or manufacturing activities. The primary purpose for the formation of hybrid lots is to reduce the waste of remnant accumulations of component items and lots through utilization in one or more conglomerate lots. Hybrid lots must be pre-approved before formation and should only be authorized for those cases in which experience has demonstrated that the safety and functioning of the item shall not be jeopardized to any undesirable extent.
C	Master Calibration Component and Master Calibration Lots	A lot designed to test the lot-testing equipment to see if they are zeroed correctly.
R	Reference lots	A test lot designed to provide the baseline performances expected of standard munitions.
M	Modified lots	A test lot with a modification introduced to see how it affects performance.
V	Overhauled lots	A lot which has been inspected and had its old components replaced with new ones. (Example would be replacing a cartridge's old primers with new moisture-proof primers or grenade shells having their fuses replaced to ensure functioning.)
G	Regrouped Lots (includes blended propellant lots)	Regrouping is when two or more complete ammunition lots are combined to form one lot. Regrouping shall only be authorized and occur when the items do not, or no longer, follow the principles of homogeneous lotting. Examples of this include: purchases of commercial items for which the lotting practices are unknown; items affected by actions, such as rework or maintenance, to the extent that the original lotting concepts are destroyed; and when there has been a loss of lot visibility. Regrouping can occur, provided the above requirement is met, regardless of type of operations which may or may not be performed in conjunction with the assemblage of these lots. The regrouping action may or may not include modification, conversion, overhaul, propellant blending, or extensive maintenance. Regrouped Lot Numbers consist of the Manufacturer's Identification Symbol of the entity that assembled the Regrouped lot rather than the manufacturer or manufacturers who made the components. It is also issued a new Interfix and Sequence number rather than those of the Lots the remnant components are from.
S	Special Lots - Proving Ground Tests, Special Requirements, Special Tests, Engineering Tests, etc.	Small quantities of ammunition items that are produced for engineering design tests and special tests for engineering evaluations. Generally they are not intended for use as service or training ammunition.

The Ammunition Lot Suffix letter is now potentially up to two letters (from letters A to Z, then AA through ZZ).

The Ammunition Lot Theater Indicator is an optional code letter indicating the ammunition is destined for an active Theater of Operations. It makes it easier to track ammunition that has been returned to stores from a combat zone. It can also be used to earmark ammunition that may need to be checked and salvaged due to potential poor handling and/or storage.

Y - Desert Shield / Desert Storm
W - Iraq / Afghanistan. Used for missile systems sent into the Southwest Asian Theater, like Javelin; Stinger; Hellfire; Tube-launched, Optically-tracked, Wire-guided missile (TOW); Guided Missile Large Rocket System (GMLRS); Army Tactical Missile System (ATACMS), and High Mobility Artillery Rocket System (HIMARS).
T - Desert Storm / Iraq & Afghanistan.

=== Lot Number ===
The Lot number is in the format of: LLH/NNL/NNNH/NNNLL/L. In this example, "L" stands for Letter, "N" stands for Number, and "H" stands for Hyphen. The slashes are to break the Lot Number code into identifiable sections.

The first section (LLH or LLL) is the three-symbol Manufacturer’s Identification Symbol, which is two or three letters long. If it is only two letters long, a Hyphen is added at the end to balance it out.

The second section (NNL) is the date code. It is composed of the last two digits of the year of manufacture and a letter suffix (A through M) indicating the month of production.

The third section (NNNH) is the Lot Interfix Number, which is a three digit number. This usually followed by a Hyphen in a standard lot, but could be followed by an Ammunition Lot Identifier code if it is non-standard.

The fourth section (NNNLL) is the Lot Sequence Number, which has three or more numbers. It could be followed by one or two Ammunition Lot Suffix code letters if there were any stoppages or changes in production for any reason, but is omitted in an homogeneous lot.

The fifth section (L) is the Ammunition Lot Theater Indicator.

=== Examples ===
	AMC97D018-013B	LS-06E071H001	LOP14G071-007BDZ
Manufacturer’s Identification Symbol	AMC	LS- (Only 2 code letters)	LOP
Year of Production	97 (1997)	06 (2006)	14 (2014)
Month of Production	D (April)	E (May)	G (July)
Lot Interfix number	018	071	071
Lot Identifier letter	-	H (Hybrid lot)	-
Lot Sequence number	013	001	007
Ammunition Lot Suffix letter	B (3rd portion of a lot)	N/A (1st or total portion of a lot)	BD (portion of a lot)
Ammunition Lot Theater Indicator letter	N/A	N/A	Z

(There is currently no Theater Indicator code letter "Z"; it is being used just as an example). N/A means "Not Applicable"; this element is not in use in this lot number.

== Manufacturer's Identification Symbols ==
=== US Manufacturers ===
ID	Company	Based In	Notes	Year Start	Year End	Ref
AAJ	AAI Corporation	Hunt Valley, Maryland	A division of Textron Systems, aerospace and defense development company.	1950		
AJM	Action Manufacturing Company	Bristol, Pennsylvania	Fuse production, test and prototype laboratories.	1948		
AKT	Action Manufacturing Company	Philadelphia, Pennsylvania		1948		
AMC	Neff Plastics	Bloomfield, Iowa				
AMJ	AMTEC Corporation	Janesville, Wisconsin	40mm Grenade ammunition and fuse production.			
AMN	Action Manufacturing Company	Atglen, Pennsylvania	Pyrotechnic ordnance production and testing.			
BRW	Borg Warner Manufacturing	Chicago, Illinois	Made cartridge cases, stripper clips and disintegrating machine-gun ammo belt links.			
FA	Frankford Arsenal	Philadelphia, Pennsylvania	Produced various ammunition.	1816	1977	
FCC	Federal Cartridge Company	Anoka, Minnesota	Produces many types of ammunition.	1922		
FNM or FNA	FN Manufacturing LLC	Columbia, South Carolina	Produces weapons such as the M16, SCAR, M249, and M240.			
HAW	Naval Ammunition Depot Hawthorne	Hawthorne, Nevada	Transferred to the US Army in 1977 to become the Hawthorne Army Ammunition Plant.	1930	1976	
HW	Hawthorne Army Ammunition Plant	Hawthorne, Nevada	Hawthorne Army Depot (HWAD)	1977	1995	
LC	Lake City Army Ammunition Plant	Independence, Missouri	A sub-contractor owned by Alliant Techsystems (ATK).			
LOP	Louisiana Army Ammunition Plant	Doyline, Louisiana	Produced various ammunition.	1942	1996	
LS	Lone Star Army Ammunition Plant	Texarkana, Texas	Produced various ammunition.	1941	2009	
MA	Milan Arsenal	Milan, Tennessee	Produced various ammunition including 40mm grenade, mortar, and artillery rounds.	1941	2019	
MEI	Martin Electronics, Inc.	Perry, Florida	Produced grenade fuses, smoke/illumination rounds, various other ordnance.		2008	
OTS		Dallas, Texas	A division of General Dynamics			
OPI	Ordnance Products Inc.	Cecil County, Maryland	Produced grenade fuses, smoke grenades, various other ordnance.	1960	1972	
PB/PBA	Pine Bluff Arsenal	Pine Bluff, Arkansas	Produces chemical and smoke grenades, various other ordnance.	1941		
-	PCP Ammunition Company	Vero Beach, Florida	Small arms ammunition production.	2011		
RA	Remington Arms				2020	
RIA	Rock Island Arsenal	Arsenal Island, Illinois		1862		
RMA	Rocky Mountain Arsenal	Commerce City, Colorado		1942	1992	
RSB	Rowley Spring & Stamping	Bristol, Connecticut				
SL	St. Louis Army Ammunition Plant	St. Louis, Missouri				
-	SIG Sauer, Inc.	Newington, New Hampshire	Small arms weapons and ammunition manufacturing.			
TAC	Talley Industries, Inc.	Phoenix, Arizona	Produced grenade fuses, smoke grenades, various other ordnance.	1960	2007	
TRW	Thompson-Ramo-Wooldridge	Euclid, Ohio	Developer of American missile systems and spacecraft, ICBM systems.	1950		
TW	Twin Cities Army Ammunition Plant	Ramsey County, Minnesota	A sub-contractor owned by Federal Cartridge.			
UPI or UPH	Unidynamics Phoenix, Inc.	Phoenix, Arizona	Produced explosive and pyrotechnic compounds.	1962	2006	
WRA	Winchester Repeating Arms		A subdivision of the Western Cartridge Company.		1931	
WCC	Western Cartridge Company	East Alton, Illinois		1944		

=== Foreign Manufacturers ===
ID	Company	Based In	Notes	Year Start	Year End	Ref
DAQ	Dominion Arsenal	Quebec City, Canada				
HXP	Greek Powder & Cartridge Company	Athens, Greece			2004	
IVI	Industries Valcartier Incorporee	Quebec, Canada	Founded in 1935, privatized in 1967 as IVI Inc., closed down in 1991.	1967	1991	
FKP	Poongsan Metal Manufacturing Co. Ltd	Busan, South Korea				
KA	Pusan Government Arsenal	Busan, South Korea				
TZZ	Israeli Military Industries	Tel Aviv, Israel		192		
VA	Verdun Arsenal	Verdun, Montreal, Quebec	Manufactured ammunition for the Canadian armed forces, as well as Britain, the United States, and the Republic of China during World War II.			
