= Terre Haute Ordnance Depot =

Supply depot

Coordinates: 39°30′13″N 87°21′25″W

The Terre Haute Ordnance Depot was a World War II-era U.S. supply depot located in Terre Haute, Indiana.

== History ==
Construction on the Terre Haute Ordnance Depot began on June 4, 1942. It was one of two ordnance depots activated in Vigo County, Indiana that year. The depot was completed on December 4, 1942, at a cost of $5.6 million. Terre Haute Ordnance Depot was located on 523 acres (2.12 km^{2}) east of Fruitridge Avenue in Terre Haute, Indiana.

== Mission ==
The Terre Haute Ordnance Depot was mostly a warehouse complex engaged in various activities. The work at Terre Haute included storing spare parts, repairing transport vehicles, and shipping supplies to other military installations.

== See also ==
- Vigo Ordnance Plant
