= Erie Proving Ground =

Coordinates: 41°32′18.5″N 83°2′6″W

- Erie Township, Ottawa County
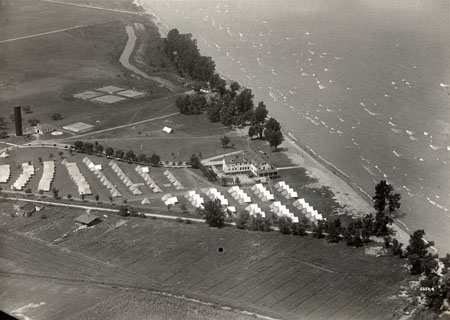
- Aerial view of Erie Proving Ground when it was known as Camp Perry.

Site information
- Type: Depot

Site history
- Built: 1906 (as camp)
- In use: 1918–1967 (as depot)

Erie Proving Ground is a decommissioned United States Army facility. Originally a camp to train gunners, the facility's foundation was due to the Spanish–American War's lack of skilled riflemen. The facility was located in Ottawa County, Ohio. The facility was established in 1918 originally as Camp Perry Proving Ground. The facility was at various times named Erie Ordnance Depot and Erie Army Depot. During World War II over 5,000 people ended up being employed there. The employed people were testing various weapon systems, armor, and such during World War II. During peacetime it served as a storage, maintenance, and repair facility. Erie Proving Ground closed in January 1967.
