= Vocabulary of Army Ordnance Stores =

Vocabulary of Army Ordnance Stores (VAOS) was the British Army system of cataloguing parts that started to be superseded in 1956 when the United Kingdom adopted the NATO Codification System.

== VAOS ==
The origins of VAOS are a result of the lessons learnt from the Crimean War, when the supply system especially the provisioning and purchase of stores was found to be haphazard and as a result the process for the acquisition of military stores was formalised by the British Board of Ordnance. The Board devised a system of inspectors with an understanding of the military's requirements, who based on the patterns and specifications would negotiate for the provision of quality goods at the right price. Issues with the Board of Ordnance performance in the Crimean War and its disastrous provision for operations during the Russian winter of 1854, brought about out the Board's demise in 1855 and the role of the inspectors was passed on the Boards successor the newly formed Military Store Department.

The Inspectors of the Board of Ordnance, who having established a credible system, were absorbed into the newly formed Military Store Department. The Military Store Department employed clerks to manage day-to-day administration, whilst commissioned officers underwent specialist training learning not just the detail of stores, but the technical aspects of in service equipment. So respected was their knowledge it was often said that the Military Stores Officers knew more about weapons and ammunition than the end users.

The Director of Stores maintained notes on all the in service equipment and kept track of changes in patterns of equipment and stores. This list was updated and circulated on a regular basis. In 1860 updates were published six monthly, but with progressive and rapid development of equipment, lists of changes were issued quarterly in 1861 and by 1868 monthly. A price list of stores was printed in 1866, and two years later a more comprehensive edition was published. The new publication, which was amended quarterly, required that units use the exact nomenclature that appeared in these Vocabularies. By 1893 the vocabulary was printed in books in tabular form with each section based on a commodity group.

The Vocabulary system used by the British Army for close to ninety years until it started to be displaced by NATO Stock Number (NSN) system in 1956. The VOAS system was also unitised by the New Zealand Army into the 1970s, when it was replaced by the NSN system.

== See also ==
- National Codification Bureau (NCB)
- NATO Codification System (NCS)
- Commercial and Government Entity (CAGE)
- List of NATO Supply Classification Groups
- List of U.S. Army weapons by supply catalog designation (1928–1956)
- Military logistics
