= Wire wrapped jewelry =

Technique for making jewelry

Wire wrapped jewelry

Wire wrapping is one of the oldest techniques for making handmade jewelry. This technique is done with jewelry wire and findings similar to wire (for example, head-pins) to make components. Wire components are then connected to one another using mechanical techniques with no soldering or heating of the wire. Frequently, in this approach, a wire is bent into a loop or other decorative shape and then the wire is wrapped around itself to finish the wire component. This makes the loop or decorative shape permanent. The technique of wrapping wire around itself gives this craft its name of wire wrapping.

== History ==
Examples of wire and beaded jewelry made using wire wrapping techniques date back to thousands of years BC. The British Museum has samples of jewelry from the Sumerian Dynasty, found in the cemetery of Ur that contain spiraled wire components. This jewelry is dated at approximately 2000 BC. Other samples of jewelry from Ancient Rome show wire wrapped loops (one of the important techniques in making wire wrapped jewelry). This Roman jewelry is dated to approximately 2,000 years ago. In the manufacture of this early jewelry the techniques for soldering did not exist. Later, as the technique for soldering developed, the wire wrapping approach continued because it was an economical and quick way to make jewelry components out of wire.

Wire wrapping techniques are not frequently used for mass-produced jewelry because machines can cast (mold) jewelry components faster, more cheaply, and more precisely. The wire wrapping approach to making jewelry is primarily employed by individuals.

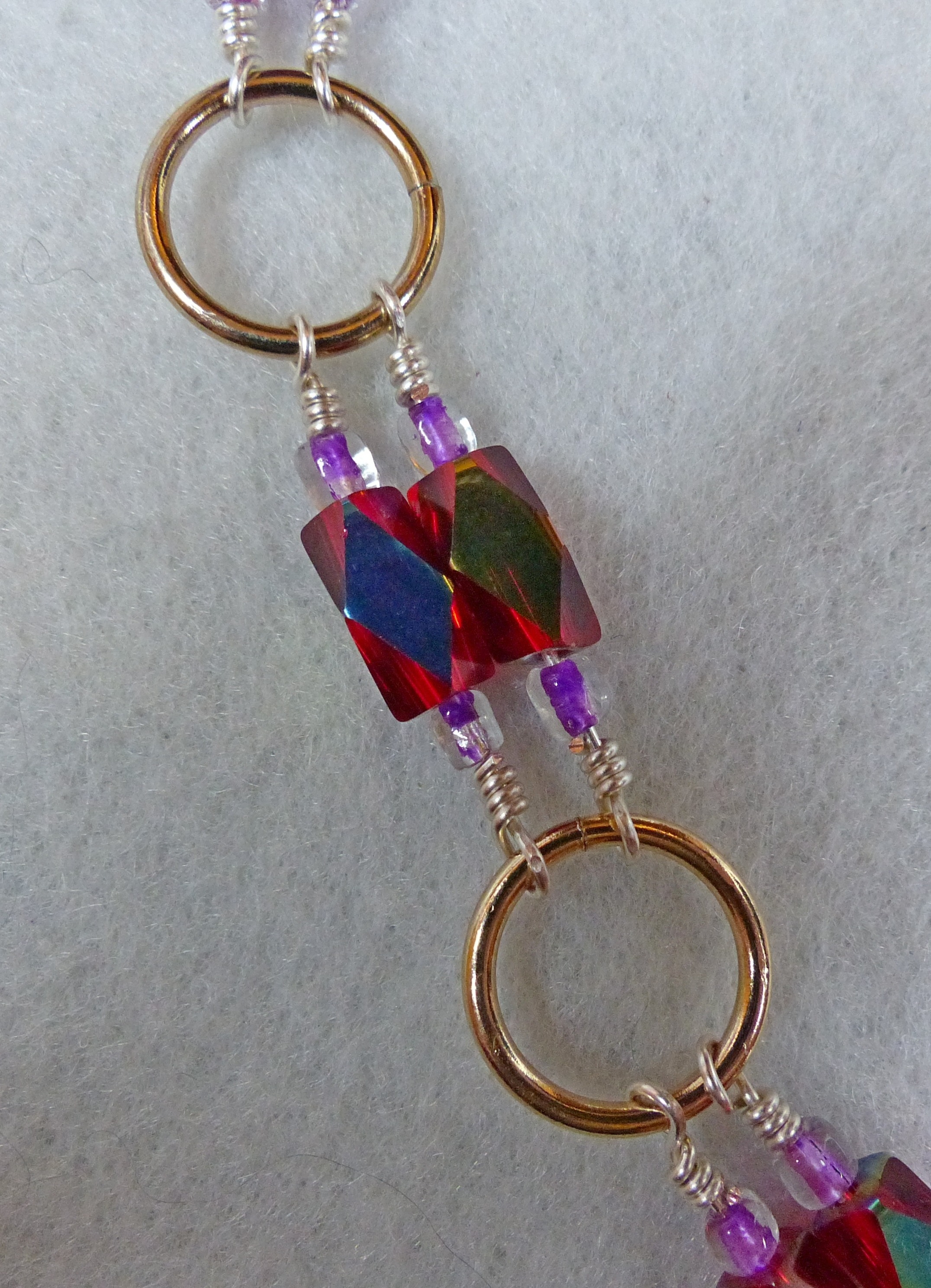
Bracelet close up, showing eight wrapped loops

== Characteristics ==
Wire wrapped jewelry is jewelry made of wire with mechanical connections instead of soldered connections. The key differences between making jewelry by wire wrapping and other approaches to making jewelry are two-fold;

1. Wire wrapped jewelry is made of wire and sometimes findings similar to wire (head-pins, jump rings, etc.)
2. Wire wrapped jewelry is made using mechanical connections between components and without soldering or other heat treatments. A mechanical connection is connecting a loop to another loop by interlocking them.

A key element in wire wrapped jewelry is a loop made in wire. Loops are connected to one another to make the mechanical connections between components. A "P" loop is made by bending the wire until it touches the wire again. Another loop is the eye loop, with a full circle of wire centered over the stem of wire (like a lollipop).

P loops and eye loops are "open" loops. This means that the loop can be opened mechanically to allow it to connect to another component, which allows it to open too easily when strained. A stronger loop is the closed loop, where the end of the wire is wrapped around the stem of the loop three or four times, so that the loop is permanent and cannot be opened, this is called a "wrapped loop". A connection between two wrapped loops must be performed before the second loop is wrapped closed.

In the simplest example of handmade wire wrapped jewelry, a bead is threaded onto a jewelry making finding called a head–pin. The bead is held in place by the "head" on the head pin. The portion of the head pin coming out of the opposite side of the bead is essentially wire. This wire is bent into a loop using hand tools and the excess wire is cut off. The resulting bead hanging from a loop is called a "bead dangle". To complete a simple earring, the loop in the bead dangle is connected to the loop at the end of an ear wire finding leaving a completed earring.

The Turkish Kazazye (also "Kazazlıc" or "Kazaz") from Trabzon is a historical technique from the Caucasus which uses silk wrapped in approximately 1000 carat silver or 24 carat gold wire that's approximately 0.08 mm in diameter.

== Tools ==
Four tools are essential and several other tools are useful in the construction of wire wrapped jewelry. The basic tools are a flush cutter, round nose pliers, flat nose pliers and chain nose or bent chain nose pliers. A flush cutter is a special type of cutter that leaves one end of the cut wire flush or flat, while the opposite end of the cut wire is sharp or pointed. Round nose pliers are pliers with conical jaws and are used for making loops in wire. Chain nose or bent chain nose pliers have flat smooth jaws and are used for gripping and holding wire and for bending wire. Flat nose pliers are just what the name implies, they are flat on both inside surfaces and are used to keep areas flat or to make 90-degree bends in your wire.

Other useful tools used in making wire wrapped jewelry are nylon jaw pliers, a ruler, step jaw pliers, a pin vise to twist the wire, a chasing hammer, an anvil or bench block, a cup bur, loop closing or bent closing pliers and a jewelry making jig.

== Wire ==
Wire is available is shapes such as round, square, half-round and patterns, such as flat and pre-twisted. It is also available in a variety of materials. Copper and brass wire are easy to shape and manipulate. Copper wire can be hammered quite thin. Brass wire is a little stiffer than copper, but it can be manipulated very easily. Sterling silver is soft enough to manipulate, but holds its shape well once it has been formed. Gold-filled wire is made by fusing a layer of 12-or 14-karat gold to a supporting material. Silver-filled wire is made in the same manner. The bond between the two materials is permanent.

Wire is measured by diameter, which is indicated by gauge numbers. The lower the gauge, the thicker the wire. A 12- or 14-gauge wire is fairly heavy, but ideal for making bangles and chokers. 10-gauge wire is very thick and stiff, while 26-gauge wire is very fine, almost as thin as hair. This thin wire is well-suited for coiling embellishments. 16-gauge wire is good for making jump rings and links for necklaces and bracelets, and 18-gauge wire is good to use for adding embellishments and making finer links.

- Memory Wire is a rigid, pre-coiled wire that makes it easy to create finger and toe rings, bracelets and necklaces.
- Beading Wire is a stranded stainless steel wire with a nylon coating. It is good to use with abrasive beads. A thinner wire will give an appealing drape to lightweight beads such as gemstone heishe, liquid gold, or liquid silver and bugle or seed beads. A thicker weight wire should be used to accommodate larger, heavier bead strands.
- Super-thin Beading Wire is a 34-gauge wire that can be used for forming shapes and weaving around findings. Because it is so fine, this wire will fit through almost any drill hole. It is to be used with lightweight beads only as it is very thin and doesn't have much tensile strength.
- Color-Coated Copper Wire (also known as Enameled Copper Wire) is copper based crafting wire that is soft, extremely malleable and retains shape moderately well.
- Precious Metal Wire – sterling silver, fine silver, and gold are the most common – is used for wire-wrapping, chain-making and other jewelry construction. It is available in four shapes, round, half-round, square and twisted.

Precious metal wire also comes in three hardnesses:

- Dead Soft wire is extremely malleable and can be bent easily into a variety of shapes. It does not hold its shape well at stress points such as clasps.
- Half-Hard wire is malleable; however, it will maintain in intricate shape under moderate stress. It is useful for weight-bearing parts of wire-wrapped jewelry.
- Full Hard wire holds its shape for wire-wrapping jewelry. Its tempered nature holds intricate designs well, and is excellent for clasps. It is harder to manipulate than either soft or half-hard wire.

== Supplies ==
A craftsperson can purchase pre-made components instead of making them. Pre-made components come under the generic name findings. The most important findings used in making jewelry are ear wires, clasps, head pins, and jump rings.

== Gallery ==
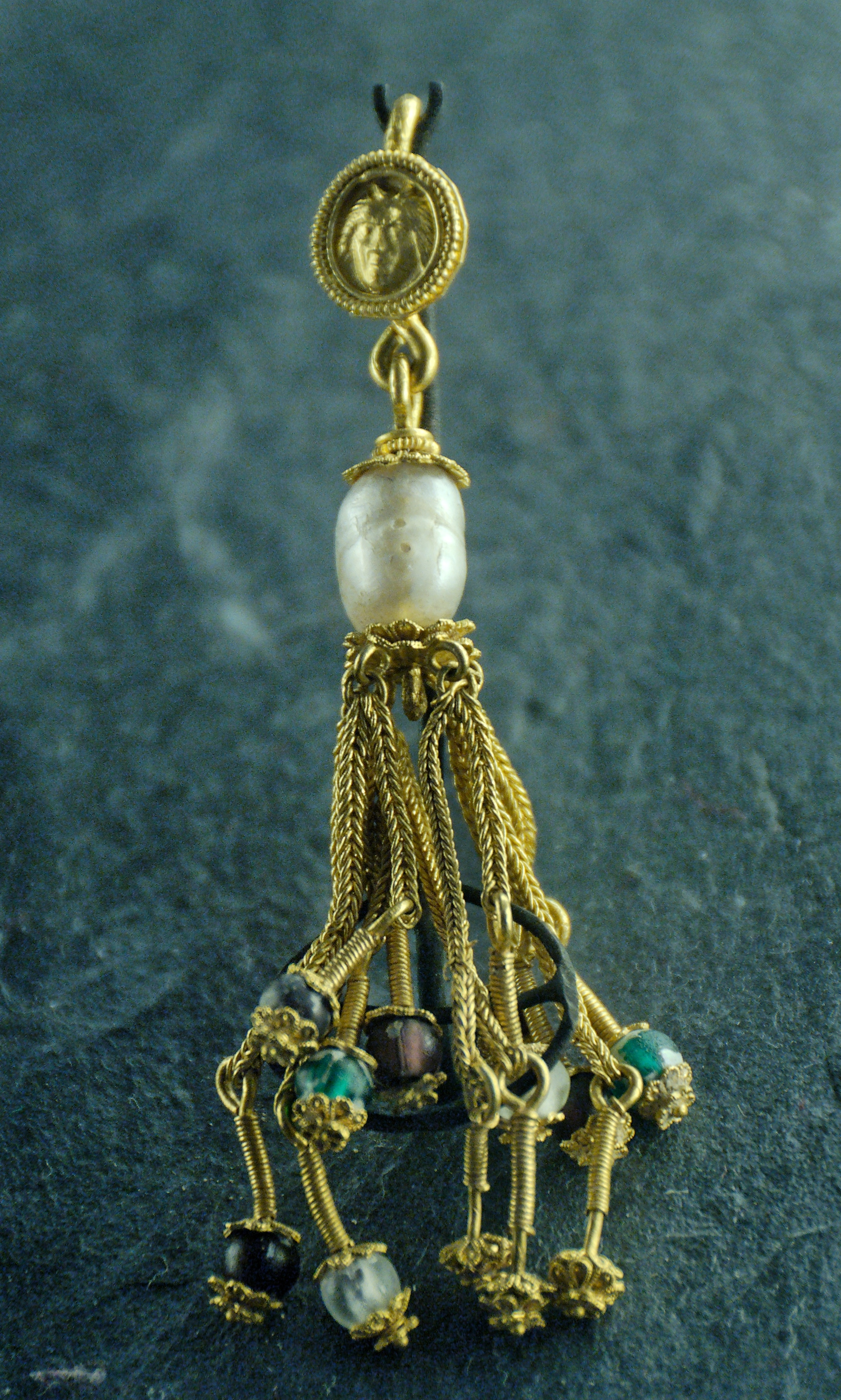
Diadem pendant. Gold, fine pearl and glass beads, Greek artwork, 3rd-2nd century BC.

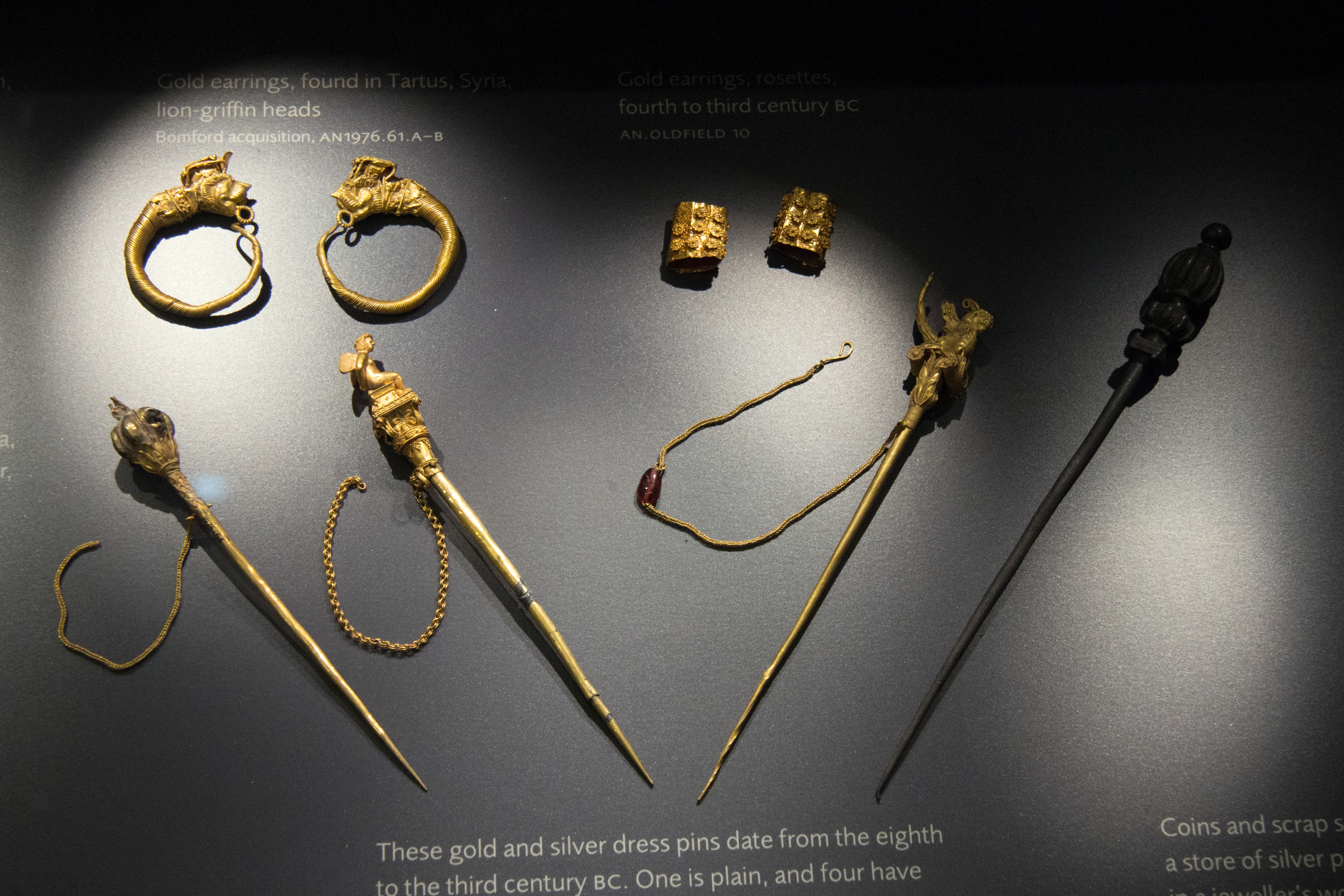
Gold and silver jewelry, 8th-3rd century BC. Ashmolean Museum, Oxford.

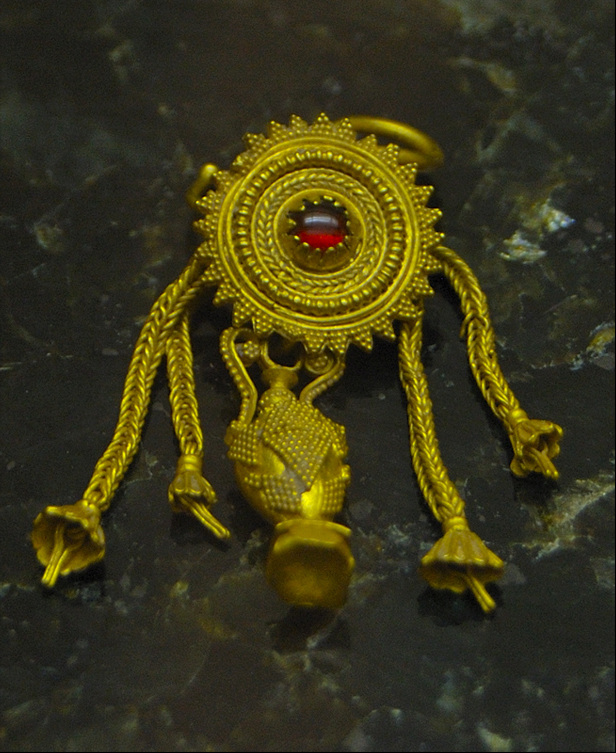
Ancient Greek earring found in the anfitheatre of Cartagena (Spain). II century b.C. Archaeological Museum of Cartagena (Spain).

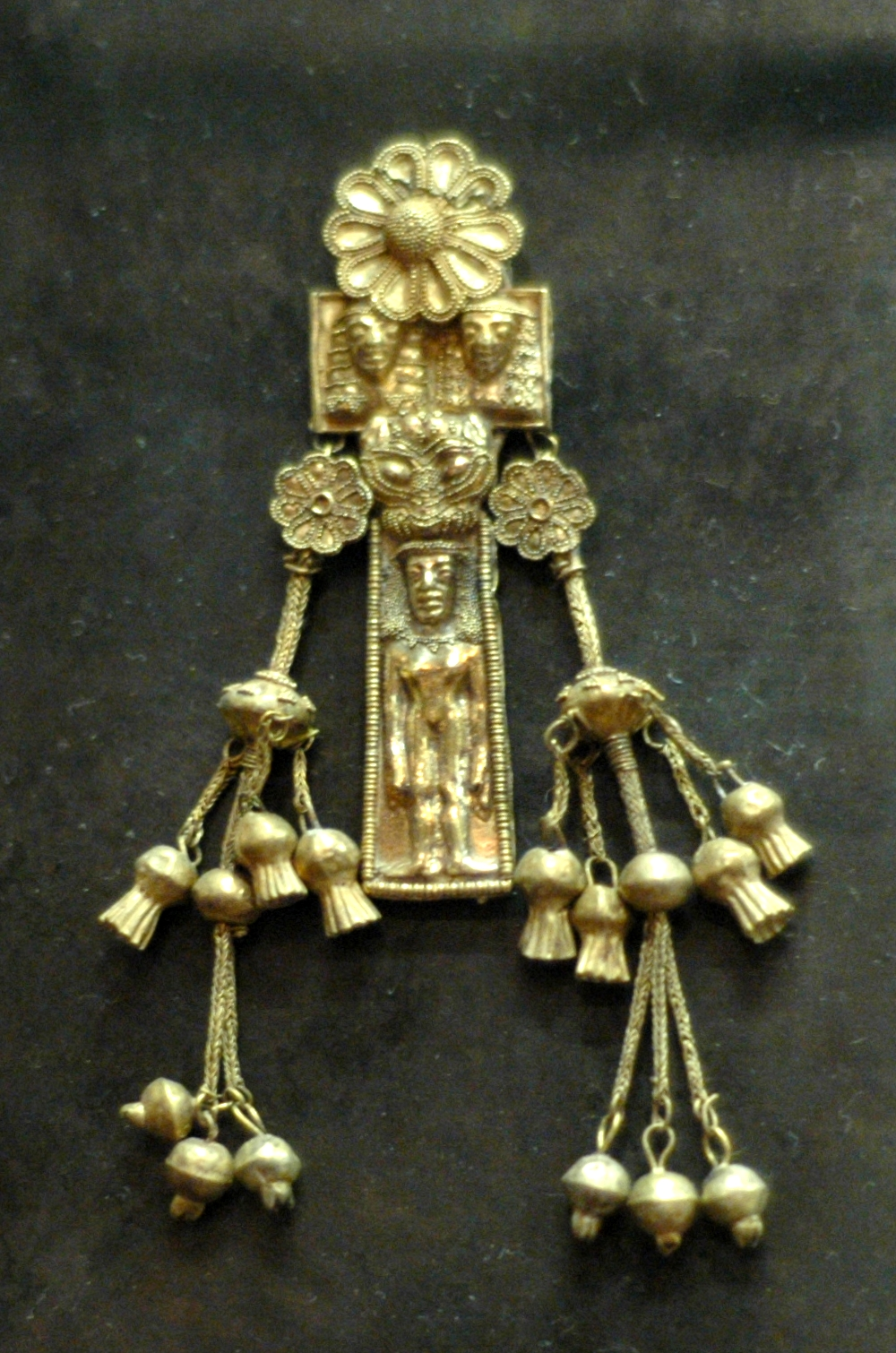
Pendant representing a naked woman. Electrum, made by a Rhodian workshop, ca. 630-620 BC. Found in the necropolis of Kameiros (Rhodes).

== See also ==
- Wire sculpture

== Sources ==
- Ogden, Jack, 1992, Interpreting the Past — Ancient Jewelry, University of California Press, ISBN 0-520-08030-0
- History of Wire Wrapped Jewelry
