= Panama remote controlled vehicle =

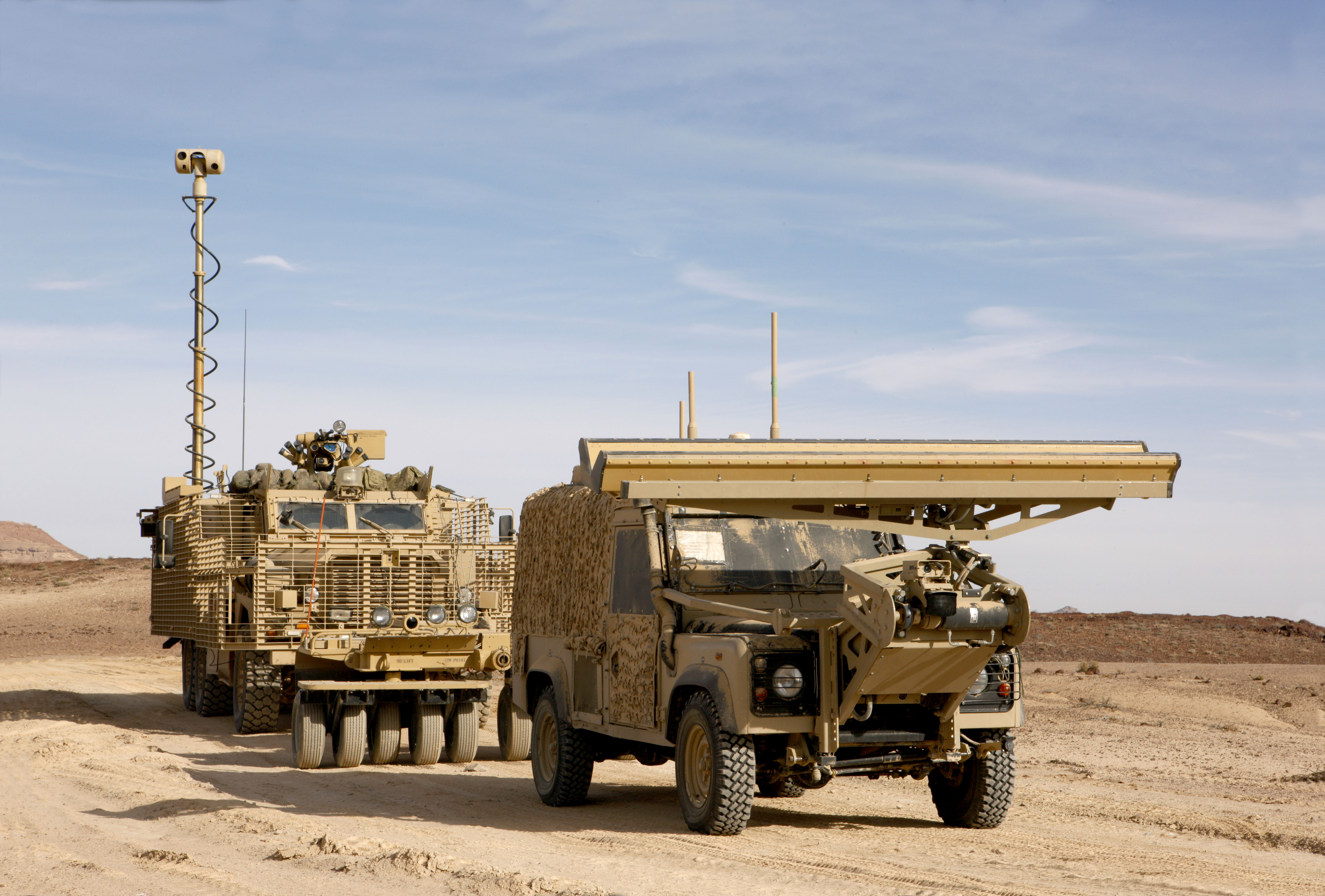
A Mastiff fitted with Choker mine rollers following on behind the Panama Remotely Operated Vehicle which carries a ground penetrating radar used for route clearance operations.

The Panama Remotely Operated Vehicle (ROV) is a piece of mine-clearing equipment used by the British Armed Forces.

== Design ==
The Panama ROV consists of a Snatch Land Rover modified for remote control operation, with a large piece of mine-detection equipment mounted to the front. It was created by Defence Equipment and Support, part of the Ministry of Defence, in conjunction with PA Consulting Group as a low-cost solution to mine detection in the War in Afghanistan. Before the introduction of the Panama, an average of one person every week was killed, with five or six more being severely injured.

The Panama vehicle is towed behind another vehicle – usually a Buffalo MRAP vehicle. It can be unhitched from the towing vehicle without the crew having to expose themselves, and remotely driven to search for explosive devices. A single system consists of two Panama vehicles and a control station. They usually work as part of a Talisman team, which consists of two Buffalo Rummage and four Mastiff 'Protected Eyes' vehicles; two micro unmanned air vehicles (MUAV); two HMEEs; and two Talon UGVs.

The vehicles are considerably cheaper than a bespoke solution, as they make use of the SN2A Snatch Land Rover, which was rendered obsolete due to poor armour protection. The military had approximately 200 of these vehicles awaiting disposal. The vehicle has been in use in Afghanistan since early 2011.

== History ==
The project took 11 months to move from procurement decision to operational use, and cost £50m in total, £9m less than expected. The use of the Snatch Land Rovers awaiting disposal, rather than a new vehicle, saves an extra £8m over the length of the contract. The programme was managed by the DE&S itself – with assistance from PA Consulting – which is unusual for procurement in the United Kingdom. However, despite the unorthodox method, the Land Rover was accepted as a solution. Lieutenant Colonel Adrian Parker of the Royal Engineers said of the choice, "There is a whole generation of technicians who are trained in their maintenance. There is a supply chain for the parts, all the manuals are written and all those thousands of parts are already codified to NATO standards. Using our scoring system, the Snatch came top." Parker also said that, as the operator uses a simple computer display which is familiar to computer game players, soldiers can learn to use the vehicle in just one hour.

The project, and PA Consulting Group, won the Management Consultancies Association Award for the best overall project in 2012.
