= Shepherd's hook =

Shepherd's hook may refer to:

- A form of crochet hook used to produce slip-stitch crochet fabric
- Shepherd's crook, an implement used by shepherds
- Earwire, a bow of wire looped to fasten an earring to a pierced ear
