= Round-nose pliers =

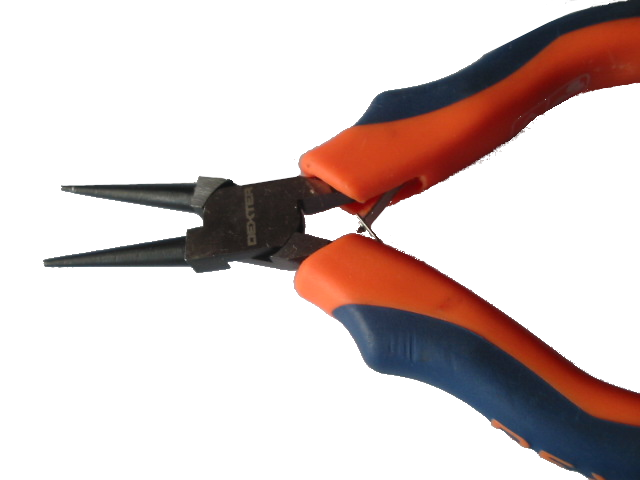

Round nose pliers, often called rosary pliers in the jewelry trade, are a specialized type of pliers characterized by their jaws of approximately round cross-section, usually of smooth surface finish and diameter tapering toward the tips.

== Uses ==
Round nose pliers are commonly used in electronics and electrical wiring for forming a loop at the end of a wire and in jewelry making to form a variety of bends in wire.

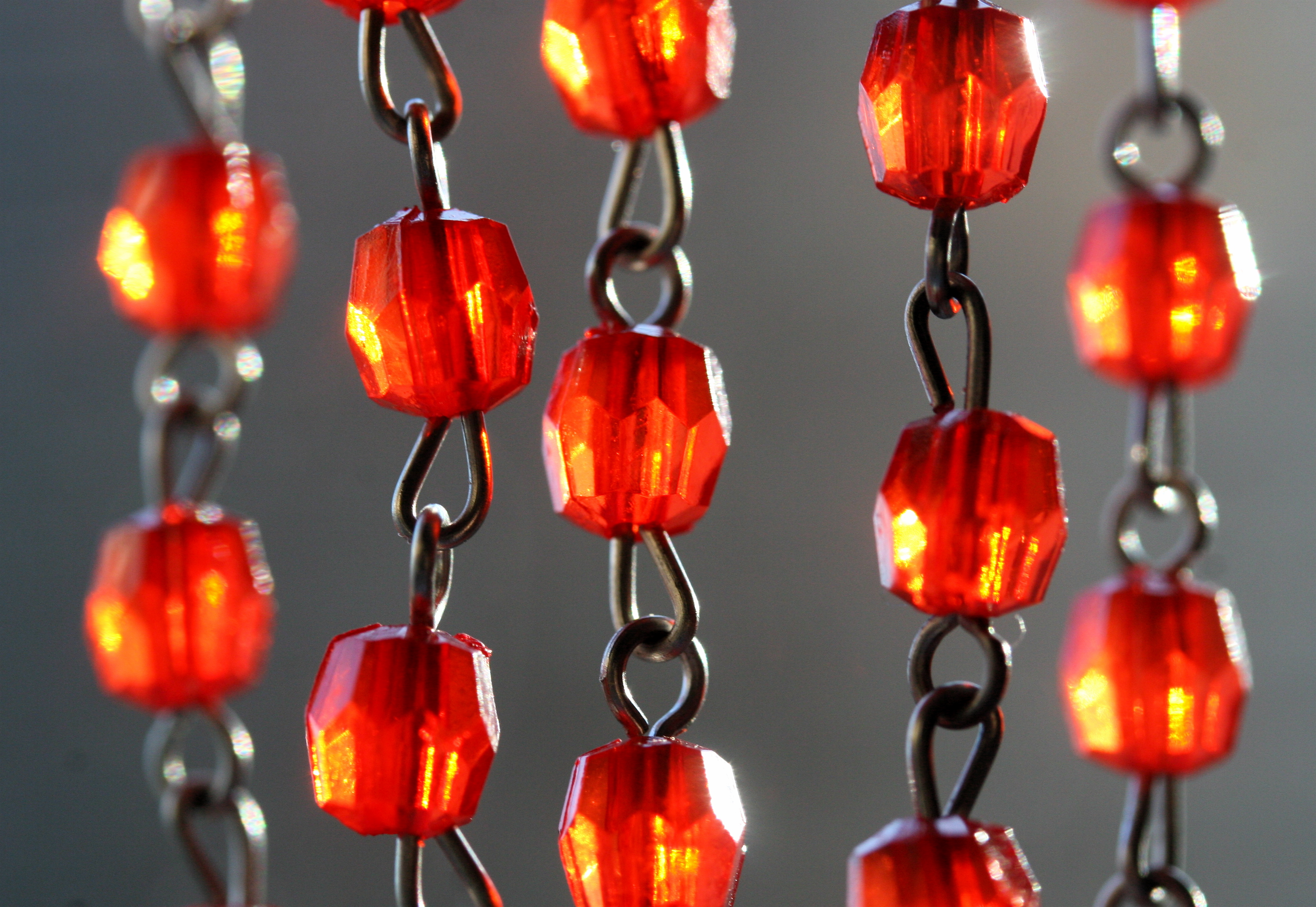
Rosary beads closeup showing wire loops.

== Variations ==
Often, round nose pliers have insulated handles for safe electrical work, a spring-fitted joint for ready opening and closing, and comfortable grips on the handles to make them easy to manipulate.

Variations particularly favored by jewelers and beadsmiths include one of the jaws flat rather than round (for making chain), jaws of differing diameters or non-tapered jaws which are used to make findings such as bails, jump rings and toggle clasps for wearable items.
