= Federal Stock Number =

Defunct codification system used by the United States federal government

The Federal Stock Number (FSN) was the codification system used by the U.S. federal government from 1955 to 1974.

It was 11 digits long. The first four digits were the Federal Supply Classification Group (FSCG) code. This relates the item to the Federal Supply Group (FSG; digits 1 & 2) and Federal Supply Classification (FSC; digits 3 & 4) of similar items that it belongs to. The next seven digits were the unique item's serial number, or Federal Item Identification Number (FIIN).

It was designed to simplify and standardize the cataloging of common items in use by the Department of Defense. It replaced the earlier hodgepodge of cataloging systems in use. The Standard Nomenclature List (SNL) was created by the US Army Ordnance Corps in 1930 and was used until 1958. The Ammunition Identification Code (AIC) was a subset of the SNL concerning munitions and explosives that was used from January, 1942 to 1958. The SNL and AIC were listed in the Ordnance Supply Catalog, which was managed by the US Army Ordnance Corps. The Quartermaster Stock Number (QSN), which codified items by government contract number, was created by the Treasury Department in 1943; it was used by the US Army Quartermaster Corps officially from 1946 to 1956. The Medical Departments of the Army, Navy and Air Force each had their own systems as well.

The first attempt at an inter-service system was the Army-Navy Munitions Board, which would procure common items for the Army, Navy, and Marine Corps. Items received the prefix "AN/" (for Army & Navy) to indicate their common use (and procured items like radios and some hand-grenades still do to this day). This existed from 1940 to 1942 before falling into a deep bureaucratic hibernation until 1945. In 1946, it was renamed the Defense Munitions Board. In 1947 they created the Cataloging Agency, a subordinate entity in charge of managing the Joint Army-Navy Catalog System. The Cataloging Agency began using the Federal Stock Number system for the first time in 1949 (though not referred to as such), but the other systems were still in use.

The use of a centralized system for defense procurement and issue was approved on July 1, 1952 with the passing of the Defense Cataloging And Standardization Act (Public Law 82-436) The first comprehensive Federal Catalog, which listed items by their FSN, was created in 1957. In 1958, the Armed Forces Supply Support Center (AFSSC) was created to manage the Federal Catalog.

The Federal Stock Number was officially replaced by the National Stock Number (NSN) beginning on September 30, 1974. The National Stock Number was the same number as the FSN, plus the two-digit National Codification Bureau (NCB) "Country Code" added between the FSCG code and the item code. The US government added the code numbers "00" in the place of the NCB digits to all FSN numbers to create compliant American NSN numbers. The National Item Identification Number (NIIN) is the two-digit Country Code plus the seven-digit Item Identification Code.

== Examples ==
Federal Supply Group 13:	Ammunition and Explosives
Federal Supply Classification Group (FSCG)	Category
1305	Ammunition, through 30mm
1310	Ammunition, over 30mm through 75mm
1315	Ammunition, over 75mm through 125mm
1320	Ammunition, over 125mm
1325	Bombs
1330	Grenades
1336	Guided Missile Warheads and Explosive Components.
1337	Guided Missile and Space Vehicle Explosive Propulsion Units, Solid Fuel; and Components.
1338	Guided Missile and Space Vehicle Inert Propulsion Units, Solid Fuel; and Components.
1340	Rockets, Rocket Ammunition, and Rocket Components.
1345	Land Mines
1346	Remote Munitions
1350	Underwater Mines and Components, Inert
1351	Underwater Mines and Components, Explosive
1352	Underwater Mine Disposal Inert Devices
1353	Underwater Mine Disposal Explosive Devices
1355	Torpedoes and Components, Inert
1356	Torpedoes and Components, Explosive
1360	Depth Charges and Components, Inert
1361	Depth Charges and Components, Explosive
1365	Military Chemical Agents
1367	Tactical Sets, Kits, and Outfits.
1370	Pyrotechnics
1375	Demolition Materials
1376	Bulk Explosives
1377	Cartridge- and Propellant-actuated Devices and Components.
1385	Surface Use Explosive Ordnance Disposal Tools And Equipment.
1386	Underwater Use Explosive Ordnance Disposal And Swimmer Weapons Systems Tools And Equipment.
1390	Fuzes and Primers
1395	Miscellaneous Ammunition
1398	Specialized Ammunition Handling and Servicing Equipment

Federal Supply Group 14:	Guided Missiles
Federal Supply Classification Group (FSCG)	Category
1410	Guided Missiles
1420	Guided Missile Components
1425	Guided Missile Systems, Complete
1427	Guided Missile Sub-systems
1430	Guided Missile Remote Control Systems
1440	Launchers, Guided Missile
1450	Guided Missile Handling and Servicing Equipment

== See also ==
- List of NATO Supply Classification Groups
- National Codification Bureau
