= NATO Stock Number =

Numeric code used by the NATO military alliance

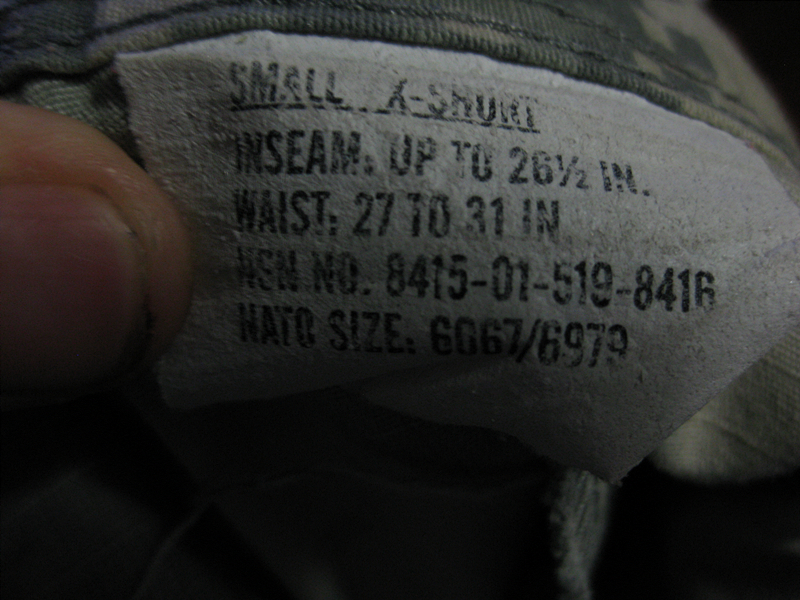
An NSN on the tag of a pair of trousers

A NATO Stock Number, or National Stock Number (NSN) as it is known in the U.S., is a 13-digit numeric code used by the NATO military alliance, identifying all the 'standardized material items of supply' as they have been recognized by all member states of NATO. Pursuant to the NATO standardization agreements, the NSN has come to be used in all treaty countries. However, many countries that use the NSN program are not members of NATO (e.g. Japan, Australia and New Zealand). A two-digit Material Management Aggregation Code (MMAC) suffix may also be appended, to denote asset end use but it is not considered part of the NSN.

In France it is known as a Numéro de Nomenclature OTAN (NNO), or "NATO Identification Number". In Spanish-speaking countries it is known as a Número Nacional de Efecto (NNE), or "National Item Number".

An item having an NSN is said to be "stock-listed".

== Structure ==
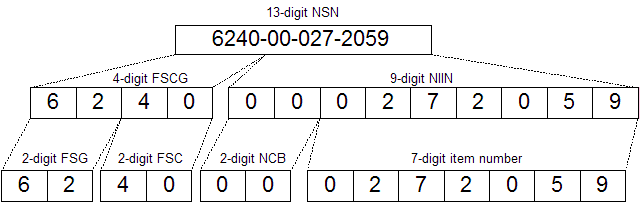

The NATO Stock Number consists of the NATO Supply Class (NSC or FSC) and the National Item Identification Number (NIIN). However the NIIN alone uniquely identifies the item, the FSC merely adds context by indicating the general classification of the item. The format of an NSN might be described as follows:

abcd-ef-ghi-jklm

Each element, a through m, was originally intended to be a single decimal digit. As inventories grew in complexity, element g became alphanumeric, beginning with uppercase A for certain newly added items. By 2000, uppercase C was in use.

=== Federal Supply Classification Group (FSCG) ===
The initial subgroup, abcd, is the Federal Supply Classification Group (FSCG) or National Supply Classification Group (NSCG). In theory, similar items would always have closely related numbers in this section of the NSN, no matter how the section is referred to. As the number of items has steadily increased and the system has become more complicated, it has not always been possible to keep similarity in numbers when the items are similar.

=== National Item Identification Number (NIIN) ===
The nine digits, ef-ghi-jklm, comprise the NIIN (National Item Identification Number). This format improves readability but is optional as NIINs are often listed without hyphens.

The first two digits of the NIIN (the ef pair) are used to record which country was the first to codify the item—which one first recognized it as an important item of supply. This is generally the country of origin, meaning the country of final manufacture. The formal name of the field is CC for Country Code or NCB, because NCB also stands for National Codification Bureau. The NCB is the organisation, typically a government agency, in charge of maintaining the NCS database within a given country. The other seven characters are a non-significant identification code. Following are the NCB codes:

Country	Tier	NCB	Country	Tier	NCB	Country	Tier	NCB
United States	3	00	Malaysia	2	34	~~Afghanistan~~ (Note: NATO suspended all ties and cooperation with Afghan authorities following the democratic government's fall to the Taliban in August 2021)	-	67
United States	3	01	Thailand	1	35	(Georgia (country)) Georgia	1	68
United States (unassigned)	3	02	Egypt	1	36	Previously assigned	-	69
United States (unassigned)	3	03	(South Korea) Republic of Korea	2	37	Saudi Arabia	1	70
United States (unassigned)	3	04	Estonia	3	38	United Arab Emirates	2	71
United States (unassigned)	3	05	Romania	3	39	India	2	72
United States (unassigned)	3	06	Slovakia	3	40	Serbia	2	73
United States (unassigned)	3	07	Austria	2	41	Pakistan	1	74
United States (unassigned)	3	08	Slovenia	3	42	(Bosnia and Herzegovina) Bosnia-Herzegovina	1	75
United States (unassigned)	3	09	Poland	3	43	Brunei Darussalam	1	76
United States (unassigned)	3	10	United Nations-standard items	N/A	44	Montenegro	3	77
NATO-standard items	N/A	11	Indonesia	2	45	Jordan	2	78
West Germany / Germany	3	12	Philippines	-	46	Peru	1	79
Belgium	3	13	Lithuania	3	47	Colombia	2	80
France	3	14	Fiji	-	48	Qatar	1	81
Italy	3	15	Tonga	-	49	Algeria	1	82
Czechoslovakia / Czech Republic	3	16	Bulgaria	3	50	Unassigned	N/A	83
Netherlands	3	17	Hungary	3	51	Unassigned	N/A	84
South Africa	1	18	Chile	1	52	Unassigned	N/A	85
Brazil	2	19	Croatia	3	53	Unassigned	N/A	86
Canada	3	20	Republic of North Macedonia (Note: The Republic of North Macedonia (formerly the Former Yugoslav Republic of Macedonia) is a country based on the borders of "Slavic" Macedonia within the former Yugoslavia. It was involved in a naming dispute with Greece, which contains the territory of "Greek" Macedonia and the historical kingdom of Macedon within its borders. This was resolved in June, 2018 and the nation was renamed the Republic of North Macedonia beginning in February, 2019.)	3	54	Unassigned	N/A	87
Canada	3	21	Latvia	3	55	Unassigned	N/A	88
Denmark	3	22	Oman	1	56	Unassigned	N/A	89
Greece	3	23	(Russia) ~~Russian Federation~~ (Note: NATO cooperation with Russia ceased 1 April 2014 in response to their annexation of Crimea.)	-	57	Unassigned	N/A	90
Iceland	3	24	Finland	3	58	Unassigned	N/A	91
Norway	3	25	Albania	3	59	Unassigned	N/A	92
Portugal	3	26	Kuwait	-	60	Unassigned	N/A	93
Turkey	3	27	Ukraine	2	61	Unassigned	N/A	94
Luxembourg	3	28	Belarus	-	62	Unassigned	N/A	95
Argentina	2	29	Morocco	2	63	Unassigned	N/A	96
Japan	2	30	Sweden	2	64	Unassigned	N/A	97
Israel	2	31	(Papua New Guinea) Papua, New Guinea	-	65	New Zealand	2	98
Singapore	2	32	Australia	2	66	United Kingdom	3	99
Spain	3	33						

As the list shows, users of the NCS system not only include the 30 NATO member countries, but the 33 NATO-sponsored countries as well. It is also grouped into tiers indicating participation and access.

Tier 3 Nations: Nation is a NATO member and has a full membership in the NATO Codification Bureau (NCB).

Tier 2 Nations: Nation has a codification system that has been certified as fully NCS compliant. There is a two-way data exchange and participation in technical NCS management.

Tier 1 Nations: Nation has access to unclassified NSN data. There is a one-way data exchange and it does not participate in technical NCS management.

Other Nations (Afghanistan, Belarus, Fiji, Ireland, Kuwait, Pakistan, Papua New Guinea, The Philippines, Tonga, Trinidad & Tobago). Belarus (62), Kuwait (60), Papua New Guinea (65) and the Philippines (46) have NCB codes but are not currently in the 1st Tier. Afghanistan (67), Fiji (48) and Tonga (49) are not currently in Tier 1 and their NCB codes are no longer listed. Ireland and Trinidad & Tobago are neither in Tier 1 nor do they have assigned NCB code numbers. Ireland, Kuwait, Papua New Guinea, and Trinidad & Tobago maintain connections to the NCB through a liaison office.

The first countries to receive NCB code numbers were the United Kingdom (99), Australia (66), and New Zealand (98)—as they had already been involved in the program. NATO was assigned the NCB code (11) for its items as it was the next number available after the 00 to 10 block set aside for the United States' own use. Canada received (21) and (20) because it was already supplying items for the United States and the Commonwealth before the system was in place; 21 was for old and current items of supply and, once the available numbers were used up, began using 20 for new items in approx 2002. The NCB code (69) was issued but has been discontinued; it might have belonged to former partners Taiwan, Iran or Iraq.

Iceland (24) and Luxembourg (28) are assigned NCB codes of their own but do not use them. All of Luxembourg's transactions are catalogued by Belgium (13) and Iceland uses other nations' NSNs when they make or order any stock items.

== Related Terms ==
=== Department of Defense Identification Code (DODIC) ===
DODIC is an alphanumeric four-symbol code which is used to identify ammunition and explosives (FSG 13 and 14). A DODIC consists of either one letter followed by three numerals (for example, A123) or two letters followed by two numerals (for example, AB12). (The numeral "Zero" (0) and the letter "O" (O) are considered the numeral "0" in the alphanumeric system to reduce confusion.) This code is shown either after the NSN or on the line underneath it on the container. The DODIC identifies the item, while the NSN identifies what type of item it is and how it is packaged and contained.

Sometimes the DODIC also contains a two-numeral NCB code prefix for the manufacturer's or repacker's country if it is different from the packager's country.

- A059 is the DODIC code for 5.56mm NATO M855 Ball type ammunition. The DODIC code also indicates that it is packed in 10-round stripper clips, 3 clips per cardboard spacer (3 clips / 30 rounds), and 4 spacers packed in a 4-pocket M8 bandoleer (one 3-clip spacer per pocket / 120 rounds per bandoleer). There are seven M8 bandoleers packed per recloseable metal M2A1 ammo can (840 rounds per can) and there are two M2A1 ammo cans per wire-bound plywood crate (1680 rounds per crate).
- Bulgaria has the NCB code number 50.
  - Therefore, the DODIC code 50-A059 designates Bulgarian-manufactured 5.56mm NATO ammunition equivalent to 5.56mm NATO M855 Ball and packed in 10-round clips in M8 bandoleers.

=== Department of Defense Ammunition Code (DODAC) ===
The DODAC includes the 4-digit NSC of the ammunition and the 4-symbol DODIC. This is used in calculating ammunition transactions to reduce errors. It is notated on DD Form 581, DA Form 3151-R, and most ammunition reports.

- 1305 is the NSC for Ammunition Through 30mm.
- A059 is the DODIC code for 5.56mm NATO M855 Ball type ammunition loaded in 10-round clips and packed in M8 Bandoleers.
- 1305-A059 is the DODAC code for a transaction involving a batch, lot, or amount of 5.56mm NATO M855 Ball ammunition packed in clips in bandoleers.

=== Local Stock Number (LSN) ===
A Local Stock Number is an experimental, substitute, or limited issue item. Its NCB code is replaced by "LL" and the first three characters of its item number are "L99". For instance, the experimental 5.56×45mm NSWC Crane Close Quarters Battle Receiver was originally codified as 1005-LL-L99-5996. When the weapon was no longer experimental and was codified as the Mk 18 MOD 0 Close Quarters Battle Rifle, the upper receiver received the NSN of 1005-01-498-1913.

=== Line Item Number (LIN) ===
A six-position alphanumeric code assigned by the Army Materiel Command that identifies the generic nomenclature of specific types of equipment. Standard LINs consist of one alphabetic character followed by five numeric characters. SUBLINs (SUBstitute LINs) are equivalent LIN items that can be used in the place of Primary LINs. The Department of Defense uses LINs and SUBLINs when drawing up contracts with vendors or planning budgets.

=== NATO Symbols ===
- A container marked with a "square cross" in a circle ⊕ means the item is made exactly to NATO standards and specifications.
  NATO Standard symbol
- A container marked with a rounded "Cross pattée" means it is a substitute item that is compatible and acceptable by NATO standards.
  NATO Interchangeable symbol
- A solid circle • indicates Ball Ammunition.
- An empty circle made with four dashed lines ◌ indicates Blank Ammunition.
- A horizontal Rectangle — represents Tracer Ammunition.
- A point-up Triangle represents Armor-Piercing Ammunition.
- A large horizontal rectangle with 5 triangles along the top (like a picket fence) indicates an ammunition charger / stripper clip. The number to the right indicates how many rounds it contains. Sometimes the Charger / Clip model designation is listed to the far right (e.g. MK 3 CGR for the 7.62mm Mark 3 Charger).
  - On old ammo containers, an oval surrounding two 4-dot lines represented an 8-round en-bloc charger. A narrow rectangle through the base of 5 cartridge shapes indicated a 5-round Stripper Clip.
- A large horizontal rectangle with a voided triangle from its base represents a bandoleer. The number to the right indicates how many rounds it holds. Sometimes the bandoleer model designation is listed to the far right (e.g., M2 BDR for the 7.62mm M2 bandoleer).
- A horizontal straight line through two circles indicates linked ammunition. The alphanumeric code after it indicates the type of links used (e.g., M27 for 5.56mm M27 links).
  - Early US Military ammunition boxes were marked with vertical rectangles or cartridge shapes lll instead. When the symbol was straight it indicated Caliber .30 ammunition and when the symbol was angled it indicated Caliber .50 ammunition. The Lot number was also marked with a "B" suffix for cloth belts or L for metal link belts.

=== Lot Number ===
The Lot Number is used for quality control. If a batch is faulty or defective, the Lot Number can be used to track down who made it, where it was made, and when it was made.

The Lot Number consists of the 1, 2, or 3-letter manufacturer's code, the two-numeral year of manufacture, the letter code - A (January) through M (December) - indicating the month, an interfix (or "batch") code that consists of 1 or more numerals, and the serial number (indicating the sequence the lot is in the batch). If the batch is disrupted for any reason (machinery overhaul or repair, product improvements initiated, or a new batch of components used in assembly) an alphabetic letter code is added at the end.

Example: Amalgamated Bio-Carbon (manufacturer code ABC) makes a batch of 40mm grenade shells in January, 2000. The batch's interfix number is 1 and its serial number is 234. The Lot Number would therefore be ABC-00-A-1-234. If part of the batch was manufactured on a different or overhauled assembly line, it would receive the Lot Number ABC-00-A-1-234A.

If the lot is made up of salvaged ammunition, it must be from the same Lot. If different ammunition types are mixed (as when ball and tracer ammunition are linked into a machinegun belt) and they originally had separate lot numbers, they must have all the ammunition lot numbers marked on the packaging. The repacker also has to put their manufacturer or military depot code and the two-digit year it was repacked on the packaging as well.

== History ==
The NSN is an expanded version of the older Federal Stock Number (FSN), which lacked the national-origin code labeled ef above, in the second subgroup. Items predating 1974 in warehouses are frequently stenciled with FSNs. As of 1998, the system is principally administered by the Defense Logistics Agency within the U.S. Department of Defense.

Other stock numbering systems are in use within the US DoD, but as of 2005, the NSN remained the most common and least ambiguous way to identify most standardized items of supply.

=== Federal Stock Number ===
A Federal Stock Number (FSN) was an 11-digit numeric code. It was first used by the Defense Munitions Board's Cataloging Agency in 1949 to identify items in the Joint Army-Navy Catalog System. On July 7, 1952 Public Law 82-436 (Defense Cataloging and Standardization Act) was passed by the second session of the 82nd Congress. It authorized the FSN to replace the Ammunition Identification Code (AIC) and Ordnance Stock Number (OSN). The Federal Stock Number was used officially from 1953 to 1974, when it was replaced by the National Stock Number. The conversion from FSN to NSN was typically done by adding "00" between the first set of numbers (the Federal Supply Class, or FSC) and the second set of numbers.

Examples
FSN	Corresponding NSN
3139-121-6210	3139-00-121-6210
8415-082-5645	8415-00-082-5645

== NIIN / NSN Catalogs ==
NIIN / NSN Catalogs include a significant number of items directly associated with military equipment in general, as well as items of a more generic use. These include Electronic Components, Medical Equipment, Office Furniture, Food items, Clothing, Industrial goods (pumps, valves, motors ...) and all kinds of Fasteners (bolts, nails, rivets ...), to name a few. For this reason, catalogs have a broader appeal, beyond their original audience (Defense agencies and their direct contractors.)

The US Catalog covers on the order of 6 Million NIINs (Items of Supply) for a total of 13 Million Items of Production (Part Number + Manufacturer reference).

The NATO Support and Procurement Agency (Capellen, Luxembourg) compiles on a regular basis the catalogs of several member nations, for the production of the NATO Master Catalogue of References for Logistics (NMCRL). This combined catalog, totaling 16 Million NIINs for approximately 32 Million Parts, is then published on DVD.

Several companies or governmental agencies publish NIIN Catalogs online or on other media. These catalogs vary greatly in term of the completeness of the information as some items and/or some segments of information may be excluded, for [USA] Security reasons or simply for lack of interest by the target audience. The distribution of these catalogs vary also in terms of the subscription cost and access or export restrictions. Some merely provide a "Part Number" lookup, while others offer advanced features such as parametric search (Search of items driven by the technical characteristics such as physical dimensions, material, color etc.) or links to associated data set.

The data behind NIIN Catalogs is constantly updated & maintained by DoD's Defense Logistics personnel and cataloging information changes often. Some NIIN Catalogs on the market are built for regular updates to its database. Other catalogs present the same data, not kept updated with the current government requirements. For example, one commonly changed item requirement is freight and packaging (number of items per pallets, stacking height, etc.). Additionally, it is important to periodically verify that manufacturer part numbers stay associated with the National Stock Numbers they've been approved for.

== Fictionalized NSNs ==
It is not unheard of for certain numbers to be referred to in works of fiction as if they were NSNs—especially in military science fiction. This can be seen as a variation on the false document technique, something used creatively in order to lend an air of authenticity.

- The M41A Pulse Rifle, from the movie Aliens, has been referred to as having NSN 3055-00-721-4790, as if it were real (though its FSG is incorrect: 30 is Mechanical Power Transmission Equipment, while 10, Weapons, is probably the right FSG).
- The spacecraft hull repair kit that the player must use in the sci-fi computer game Mission Critical, to stop the decompression emergency, has "NSN 5920-385-19468" stenciled on the side of its plastic box.

== See also ==
- Stock keeping unit (SKU)
- National Codification Bureau (NCB)
- NATO Codification System (NCS)
- Commercial and Government Entity (CAGE)
- List of NATO Supply Classification Groups
- Army Nomenclature System
- Navy Mark and MOD nomenclature
- List of U.S. Army weapons by supply catalog designation (1928–1956)
- Military logistics
- Vocabulary of Army Ordnance Stores
- List of Battery Sizes with NATO Stock Numbers (NSN)
