= List of NATO Supply Classification Groups =

The NATO Item Identification Number or National Item Identification Number (NIIN) is a 9-digit alphanumeric code created by the NATO Codification Bureaux to designate unique items of supply.

The NATO Stock Number or National Stock Number (NSN) is a 13-digit alphanumeric code consisting of a Group of Supply, a Class of Supply and the unique NIIN to designate unique items of supply grouped by their relative catalog category.

The first four digits are the NATO Supply Classification (NSC) or Federal Supply Class (FSC) code. The first two digits are the NATO Supply Group (NSG) or Federal Supply Group (FSG).

Examples:

== Group 10: Weapons ==
- 1005: Weapons (from 1 mm through 30 mm).
- 1010: Weapons (from 31 mm to 75 mm).
- 1015: Weapons (from 76 mm to 125 mm).
- 1020: Weapons (from 126 mm to 150 mm).
- 1025: Weapons (from 151 mm to 300 mm).
- 1030: Weapons (from 300 mm+).
- 1040: Chemical Weapons and Equipment.
- 1045: Launchers, Torpedo and Depth Charge
- 1055: Launchers, Rocket and Pyrotechnic
- 1070: Nets and Booms, Ordnance
- 1075: Degaussing and Mine Sweeping Equipment
- 1080: Camouflage and Deception Equipment
- 1090: Assemblies Interchangeable Between Weapons in Two or More Classes

== Group 11: Nuclear Ordnance ==
- 1105: Nuclear Bombs
- 1110: Nuclear Projectiles
- 1115: Nuclear Warheads and Warhead Sections
- 1120: Nuclear Depth Charges
- 1125: Nuclear Demolition Charges
- 1127: Nuclear Rockets
- 1130: Conversion Kits, Nuclear Ordnance
- 1135: Fusing and Firing Devices, Nuclear Ordnance
- 1140: Nuclear Components
- 1145: Explosive and Pyrotechnic Components, Nuclear Ordnance
- 1190: Specialized Test and Handling Equipment, Nuclear Ordnance
- 1195: Miscellaneous Nuclear Ordnance

== Group 12: Fire Control Equipment ==
- 1210: Fire Control Directors
- 1220: Fire Control Computing Sights and Devices
- 1230: Fire Control Systems, Complete
- 1240: Optical Sighting and Ranging Equipment
- 1250: Fire Control Stabilizing Mechanisms
- 1260: Fire Control Designating and Indicating Equipment
- 1265: Fire Control Transmitting and Receiving Equipment, except Airborne
- 1270: Aircraft Gunnery Fire Control Components
- 1280: Aircraft Bombing Fire Control Components
- 1285: Fire Control Radar Equipment, except Airborne
- 1287: Fire Control Sonar Equipment
- 1290: Miscellaneous Fire Control Equipment

== Group 13: Ammunition and Explosives ==
- 1305: Ammunition, through 30mm (1mm - 30mm)
- 1310: Ammunition, over 30mm through 75mm (31mm-75mm)
- 1315: Ammunition, over 75mm through 125mm (76mm - 125mm)
- 1320: Ammunition, over 125mm (126mm +)
- 1325: Bombs
- 1330: Grenades
- 1336: Guided Missile Warheads and Explosive Components
- 1337: Guided Missile and Space Vehicle Explosive Propulsion Units, Solid Fuel; and Components
- 1338: Guided Missile and Space Vehicle Inert Propulsion Units, Solid Fuel; and Components.
- 1340: Rockets, Rocket Ammunition and Rocket Components
- 1345: Land Mines
- 1350: Underwater Mine and Components, Inert
- 1351: Underwater Mines and Components, Explosive
- 1352: Underwater Mine Disposal Inert Devices
- 1353: Underwater Mine Disposal Explosive Devices
- 1355: Torpedoes and Components, Inert
- 1356: Torpedoes and Components, Explosive
- 1360: Depth Charges and Components, Inert
- 1361: Depth Charges and Components, Explosive
- 1365: Military Chemical Agents
- 1370: Pyrotechnics
- 1375: Demolition Materials
- 1376: Bulk Explosives
- 1377: Cartridge and Propellant Actuated Devices and Components
- 1385: Surface Use Explosive Ordnance Disposal Tools and Equipment
- 1386: Underwater Use Explosive Ordnance Disposal and Swimmer Weapons Systems Tools and Equipment
- 1390: Fuzes and Primers
- 1395: Miscellaneous Ammunition
- 1398: Specialized Ammunition Handling and Servicing Equipment

== Group 14: Guided Missiles ==
- 1410: Guided Missiles
- 1420: Guided Missile Components
- 1425: Guided Missile Systems, Complete
- 1427: Guided Missile Sub-systems
- 1430: Guided Missile Remote Control Systems
- 1440: Launchers, Guided Missile
- 1450: Guided Missile Handling and Servicing Equipment

== Group 15: Aircraft and Airframe Structural Components ==
- 1510: Aircraft, Fixed Wing
- 1520: Aircraft, Rotary Wing
- 1540: Gliders
- 1550: Unmanned Aircraft
- 1560: Airframe Structural Components

== Group 16: Aircraft Components and Accessories ==
- 1610: Aircraft Propellers and Components
- 1615: Helicopter Rotor Blades, Drive Mechanisms and Components
- 1620: Aircraft Landing Gear Components
- 1630: Aircraft Wheel and Brake Systems
- 1640: Aircraft Control Cable Products
- 1650: Aircraft Hydraulic, Vacuum, and De-icing System Components
- 1660: Aircraft Air Conditioning, Heating, and Pressurizing Equipment
- 1670: Parachutes; Aerial Pick Up, Delivery, Recovery Systems; and Cargo Tie Down Equipment
- 1680: Miscellaneous Aircraft Accessories and Components

== Group 17: Aircraft Launching, Landing, and Ground Handling Equipment ==
- 1710: Aircraft Landing Equipment
- 1720: Aircraft Launching Equipment
- 1730: Aircraft Ground Servicing Equipment
- 1740: Airfield Specialized Trucks and Trailers

== Group 18: Space Vehicles ==
- 1810: Space Vehicles
- 1820: Space Vehicle Components
- 1830: Space Vehicle Remote Control Systems
- 1840: Space Vehicle Launchers
- 1850: Space Vehicle Handling and Servicing Equipment
- 1860: Space Survival Equipment

== Group 19: Ships, Small Craft, Pontoons, and Floating Docks ==
- 1905: Combat Ships and Landing Vessels
- 1910: Transport Vessels, Passenger and Troop
- 1915: Cargo and Tanker Vessels
- 1920: Fishing Vessels
- 1925: Special Service Vessels
- 1930: Barges and Lighters, Cargo
- 1935: Barges and Lighters, Special Purpose
- 1940: Small Craft
- 1945: Pontoons and Floating Docks
- 1950: Floating Drydocks
- 1955: Dredges
- 1990: Miscellaneous Vessels

== Group 20: Ship and Marine Equipment ==
- 2010: Ship and Boat Propulsion Components
- 2020: Rigging and Rigging Gear
- 2030: Deck Machinery
- 2040: Marine Hardware and Hull Items
- 2050: Buoys
- 2060: Commercial Fishing Equipment
- 2090: Miscellaneous Ship and Marine Equipment

== Group 22: Railway Equipment ==
- 2210: Locomotives
- 2220: Rail Cars
- 2230: Right-of-Way Construction and Maintenance Equipment, Railroad
- 2240: Locomotive and Rail Car Accessories and Components
- 2250: Track Material, Railroad

== Group 23: Ground Effect Vehicles, Motor Vehicles, Trailers, and Cycles ==
- 2305: Ground Effect Vehicles
- 2310: Passenger Motor Vehicles
- 2320: Trucks and Truck Tractors, Wheeled
- 2330: Trailers
- 2340: Motorcycles, Motor Scooters, and Bicycles
- 2350: Combat, Assault, and Tactical Vehicles, Tracked
- 2355: Combat, Assault, and Tactical Vehicles, Wheeled

== Group 24: Tractors ==
- 2410: Tractor, Full Tracked, Low Speed
- 2420: Tractors, Wheeled
- 2430: Tractors, Full Tracked, High Speed

== Group 25: Vehicular Equipment Components ==
- 2510: Vehicular Cab, Body, and Frame Structural Components
- 2520: Vehicular Power Transmission Components
- 2530: Vehicular Brake, Steering, Axle, Wheel, and Track Components
- 2540: Vehicular Furniture and Accessories
- 2541: Weapons Systems Specific Vehicular Accessories
- 2590: Miscellaneous Vehicular Components

== Group 26: Tires and Tubes ==
- 2610: Tires and Tubes, Pneumatic, Except Aircraft
- 2620: Tires and Tubes, Pneumatic, Aircraft
- 2630: Tires, Solid and Cushion
- 2640: Tire Rebuilding and Tire and Tube Repair Materials

== Group 28: Engines, Turbines, and Components ==
- 2805: Gasoline Reciprocating Engines, Except Aircraft; and Components
- 2810: Gasoline Reciprocating Engines, Aircraft Prime Mover; and Components
- 2815: Diesel Engines and Components
- 2820: Steam Engines, Reciprocating; and Components
- 2825: Steam Turbines and Components
- 2830: Water Turbines and Water Wheels; and Components
- 2835: Gas Turbines and Jet Engines; Non-Aircraft Prime Mover, Aircraft Non-Prime Mover, and Components
- 2840: Gas Turbines and Jet Engines, Aircraft, Prime Moving; and Components
- 2845: Rocket Engines and Components
- 2850: Gasoline Rotary Engines and Components
- 2895: Miscellaneous Engines and Components

== Group 29: Engine Accessories ==
- 2910: Engine Fuel System Components, Nonaircraft
- 2915: Engine Fuel System Components, Aircraft and Missile Prime Movers
- 2920: Engine Electrical System Components, Nonaircraft
- 2925: Engine Electrical System Components, Aircraft Prime Moving
- 2930: Engine Cooling System Components, Nonaircraft
- 2935: Engine System Cooling Components, Aircraft Prime Moving
- 2940: Engine Air and Oil Filters, Strainers, and Cleaners, Nonaircraft
- 2945: Engine Air and Oil Filters, Cleaners, Aircraft Prime Moving
- 2950: Turbo Supercharger and Components
- 2990: Miscellaneous Engine Accessories, Nonaircraft
- 2995: Miscellaneous Engine Accessories, Aircraft

== Group 30: Mechanical Power Transmission Equipment ==
- 3010: Torque Converters and Speed Changers
- 3020: Gears, Pulleys, Sprockets, and Transmission Chain
- 3030: Belting, Drive Belts, Fan Belts, and Accessories
- 3040: Miscellaneous Power Transmission Equipment

== Group 31: Bearings ==
- 3110: Ball Bearings, Anti-Friction, Unmounted
- 3120: Bearings, Plain, Unmounted
- 3130: Bearings, Mounted
- 3140: Bearings, Spherical roller

== Group 32: Woodworking Machinery and Equipment ==
- 3210: Sawmill and Planing Mill Machinery
- 3220: Woodworking Machines
- 3230: Tools and Attachments for Woodworking Machinery

== Group 33: Historical FSG (used for file maintenance purposes only) ==
- 3365: Historical FSC
- 3375: Historical FSC

== Group 34: Metalworking Machinery ==
- 3405: Saws and Filing Machines
- 3408: Machining Centers and Way-Type Machines
- 3410: Electrical and Ultrasonic Erosion Machines
- 3411: Boring Machines
- 3412: Broaching Machines
- 3413: Drilling and Tapping Machines
- 3414: Gear Cutting and Finishing Machines
- 3415: Grinding Machines
- 3416: Lathes
- 3417: Milling Machines
- 3418: Planers and Shapers
- 3419: Miscellaneous Machine Tools
- 3422: Rolling Mills and Drawing Machines
- 3424: Metal Heat Treating and Non-Thermal Treating Equipment
- 3426: Metal Finishing Equipment
- 3431: Electric Arc Welding Equipment
- 3432: Electric Resistance Welding Equipment
- 3433: Gas Welding, Heat Cutting, and Metalizing Equipment
- 3436: Welding Positioners and Manipulators
- 3438: Miscellaneous Welding Equipment
- 3439: Miscellaneous Welding, Soldering, and Brazing Supplies and Accessories
- 3441: Bending and Forming Machines
- 3442: Hydraulic and Pneumatic Presses, Power Driven
- 3443: Mechanical Presses, Power Driven
- 3444: Manual Presses
- 3445: Punching and Shearing Machines
- 3446: Forging Machinery and Hammers
- 3447: Wire and Metal Ribbon Forming Machines
- 3448: Riveting Machines
- 3449: Miscellaneous Secondary Metal Forming and Cutting Machines
- 3450: Machine Tools, Portable
- 3455: Cutting Tools for Machine Tools
- 3456: Cutting and Forming Tools for Secondary Metalworking Machinery
- 3460: Machine Tool accessories
- 3461: Accessories for Secondary Metalworking Machinery
- 3465: Production Jigs, Fixtures, and Templates
- 3470: Machine Shop Sets, Kits, and Outfits

== Group 35: Service and Trade Equipment ==
- 3510: Laundry and Dry Cleaning Equipment
- 3520: Shoe Repairing Equipment
- 3530: Industrial Sewing Machines and Mobile Textile Repair Shops
- 3540: Wrapping and Packaging Machinery
- 3550: Vending and Coin Operated Machines
- 3590: Miscellaneous Service and Trade Equipment

== Group 36: Special Industry Machinery ==
- 3605: Food Products Machinery and Equipment
- 3610: Printing, Duplicating, and Bookbinding Equipment
- 3611: Industrial Marking Machines
- 3615: Pulp and Paper Industries Machinery
- 3620: Rubber and Plastics Working Machinery
- 3625: Textile Industries Machinery
- 3630: Clay and Concrete Products Industries Machinery
- 3635: Crystal and Glass Industries Machinery
- 3640: Tobacco Manufacturing Machinery
- 3645: Leather Tanning and Leather Working Industries Machinery
- 3650: Chemical and Pharmaceutical Products Manufacturing Machinery
- 3655: Gas Generating and Dispensing Systems, Fixed or Mobile
- 3660: Industrial Size Reduction Machinery
- 3670: Specialized Semiconductor, Microcircuit, and Printed Circuit Board Manufacturing Machinery
- 3680: Foundry Machinery, Related Equipment and Supplies
- 3685: Specialized Metal Container Manufacturing Machinery and Related Equipment
- 3690: Specialized Ammunition and Ordnance Machinery and Related Equipment
- 3693: Industrial Assembly Machines
- 3694: Clean Work Stations, Controlled Environment, and Related Equipment
- 3695: Miscellaneous Special Industry Machinery

== Group 37: Agricultural Machinery and Equipment ==
- 3710: Soil Preparation Equipment
- 3720: Harvesting Equipment
- 3730: Dairy, Poultry, and Livestock Equipment
- 3740: Pest, Disease, and Frost Control Equipment
- 3750: Gardening Implements and Tools
- 3760: Animal Drawn Vehicles and Farm Trailers
- 3770: Saddlery, Harness, Whips, and Related Animal Furnishings

== Group 38: Construction, Mining, Excavating, and Highway Maintenance Equipment ==
- 3805: Earth Moving and Excavating Equipment
- 3810: Cranes and Crane-Shovels
- 3815: Crane and Crane-Shovel Attachments
- 3820: Mining, Rock Drilling, Earth Boring, and Related Equipment
- 3825: Road Clearing, Cleaning, and Marking Equipment
- 3830: Truck and Tractor Attachments
- 3835: Petroleum Production and Distribution Equipment
- 3895: Miscellaneous Construction Equipment

== Group 39: Materials Handling Equipment ==
- 3910: Conveyors
- 3915: Materials Feeders
- 3920: Material Handling Equipment, Nonself-Propelled
- 3930: Warehouse Trucks and Tractors, Self-Propelled
- 3940: Blocks, Tackle, Rigging, and Slings
- 3950: Winches, Hoists, Cranes, and Derricks
- 3960: Freight Elevators
- 3990: Miscellaneous Materials Handling Equipment

== Group 40: Rope, Cable, Chain, and Fittings ==
- 4010: Chain and Wire Rope
- 4020: Fiber Rope, Cordage, and Twine
- 4030: Fittings for Rope, Cable, and Chain

== Group 41: Refrigeration, Air Conditioning, and Air Circulating Equipment ==
- 4110: Refrigeration Equipment
- 4120: Air Conditioning Equipment
- 4130: Refrigeration and Air Conditioning Components
- 4140: Fans, Air Circulators, and Blower Equipment
- 4150: Vortex Tubes and Other Related Cooling Tubes

== Group 42: Fire Fighting, Rescue, and Safety Equipment; and Environmental Protection Equipment and Materials ==
- 4210: Fire Fighting Equipment
- 4220: Marine Lifesaving and Diving Equipment
- 4230: Decontaminating and Impregnating Equipment
- 4235: Hazardous Material Spill Containment and Clean-up Equipment and Material
- 4240: Safety and Rescue Equipment
- 4250: Recycling and Reclamation Equipment

== Group 43: Pumps and Compressors ==
- 4310: Compressors and Vacuum Pumps
- 4320: Power and Hand Pumps
- 4330: Centrifugals, Separators, and Pressure and Vacuum Filters

== Group 44: Furnace, Steam Plant, and Drying Equipment; and Nuclear Reactors ==
- 4410: Industrial Boilers
- 4420: Heat Exchangers and Steam Condensers
- 4430: Industrial Furnaces, Kilns, Lehrs, and Ovens
- 4440: Driers, Dehydrators, and Anhydrators
- 4460: Air Purification Equipment
- 4470: Nuclear Reactors

== Group 45: Plumbing, Heating, and Waste Disposal Equipment ==
- 4510: Plumbing Fixtures and Accessories
- 4520: Space and Water Heating Equipment
- 4530: Fuel Burning Equipment Units
- 4540: Waste Disposal Equipment

== Group 46: Water Purification and Sewage Treatment Equipment ==
- 4610: Water Purification Equipment
- 4620: Water Distillation Equipment, Marine and Industrial
- 4630: Sewage Treatment Equipment

== Group 47: Pipe, Tubing, Hose, and Fittings ==
- 4710: Pipe, Tube and Rigid Tubing
- 4720: Hose and Flexible Tubing
- 4730: Hose, Pipe, Tube, Lubrication, and Railing Fittings

== Group 48: Valves ==
- 4810: Valves, Powered
- 4820: Valves, Nonpowered

== Group 49: Maintenance and Repair Shop Equipment ==
- 4910: Motor Vehicle Maintenance and Repair Shop Specialized Equipment
- 4920: Aircraft Maintenance and Repair Shop Specialized Equipment
- 4921: Torpedo Maintenance, Repair, and Checkout Specialized Equipment
- 4923: Depth Charges and Underwater Mines Maintenance, Repair, and Checkout Specialized Equipment
- 4925: Ammunition Maintenance, Repair, and Checkout Specialized Equipment
- 4927: Rocket Maintenance, Repair and Checkout Specialized Equipment
- 4930: Lubrication and Fuel Dispensing Equipment
- 4931: Fire Control Maintenance and Repair Shop Specialized Equipment
- 4933: Weapons Maintenance and Repair Shop Specialized Equipment
- 4935: Guided Missile Maintenance, Repair, and Checkout Specialized Equipment
- 4940: Miscellaneous Maintenance and Repair Shop Specialized Equipment
- 4960: Space Vehicle Maintenance, Repair, and Checkout Specialized Equipment
- 4970: Multiple Guided Weapons, Specialized Maintenance and Repair Shop Equipment

== Group 51: Hand Tools ==
- 5110: Hand Tools, Edged, Non-powered
- 5120: Hand Tools, Non-edged, Non-powered
- 5130: Hand Tools, Power Driven
- 5133: Drill Bits, Counterbores, and Countersinks: Hand and Machine
- 5136: Taps, Dies, and Collets; Hand and Machine
- 5140: Tool and Hardware Boxes
- 5180: Sets, Kits, and Outfits of Hand Tools

== Group 52: Measuring Tools ==
- 5210: Measuring Tools, Craftsmen's
- 5220: Inspection Gages and Precision Layout Tools
- 5280: Sets, Kits, and Outfits of Measuring Tools

== Group 53: Hardware and Abrasives ==
- 5305: Screws
- 5306: Bolts
- 5307: Studs
- 5310: Nuts and Washers
- 5315: Nails, Machine Keys, and Pins
- 5320: Rivets
- 5325: Fastening Devices
- 5330: Packing and Gasket Materials
- 5331: O-Ring
- 5335: Metal Screening
- 5340: Hardware, Commercial
- 5341: Brackets
- 5342: Hardware, Weapon System
- 5345: Disks and Stones, Abrasive
- 5350: Abrasive Materials
- 5355: Knobs and Pointers
- 5360: Coil, Flat, Leaf, and Wire Springs
- 5365: Bushings, Rings, Shims, and Spacers

== Group 54: Prefabricated Structures and Scaffolding ==
- 5410: Prefabricated and Portable Buildings
- 5411: Rigid Wall Shelters
- 5419: Collective Modular Support System
- 5420: Bridges, Fixed and Floating
- 5430: Storage Tanks
- 5440: Scaffolding Equipment and Concrete Forms
- 5445: Prefabricated Tower Structures
- 5450: Miscellaneous Prefabricated Structures

== Group 55: Lumber, Millwork, Plywood, and Veneer ==
- 5510: Lumber and Related Basic Wood Materials
- 5520: millwork
- 5530: Plywood and Veneer

== Group 56: Construction and Building Materials ==
- 5610: Mineral Construction Materials, Bulk
- 5620: Tile, Brick and Block
- 5630: Pipe and Conduit, Nonmetallic
- 5640: Wallboard, Building Paper, and Thermal Insulation Materials
- 5650: Roofing and Siding Materials
- 5660: Fencing, Fences, Gates and Components
- 5670: Building Components, Prefabricated
- 5675: Non-wood Construction Lumber and Related Materials
- 5680: Miscellaneous Construction Materials

== Group 58: Communication, Detection, and Coherent Radiation Equipment ==
- 5805: Telephone and Telegraph Equipment
- 5810: Communications Security Equipment and Components
- 5811: Other Cryptologic Equipment and Components
- 5815: Teletype and Facsimile Equipment
- 5820: Radio and Television Communication Equipment, Except Airborne
- 5821: Radio and Television Communication Equipment, Airborne
- 5825: Radio Navigation Equipment, Except Airborne
- 5826: Radio Navigation Equipment, Airborne
- 5830: Intercommunication and Public Address Systems, Except Airborne
- 5831: Intercommunication and Public Address Systems, Airborne
- 5835: Sound Recording and Reproducing Equipment
- 5836: Video Recording and Reproducing Equipment
- 5840: Radar Equipment, Except Airborne
- 5841: Radar Equipment, Airborne
- 5845: Underwater Sound Equipment
- 5850: Visible and Invisible Light Communication Equipment
- 5855: Night Vision Equipment, Emitted and Reflected Radiation
- 5860: Stimulated Coherent Radiation Devices, Components, and Accessories
- 5865: Electronic Countermeasures, Counter-Countermeasures, and Quick Reaction Capability Equipment
- 5895: Miscellaneous Communication Equipment

== Group 59: Electrical and Electronic Equipment Components ==
- 5905: Resistors
- 5910: Capacitors
- 5915: Filters and Networks
- 5920: Fuses, Arrestors, Absorbers, and Protectors
- 5925: Circuit Breakers
- 5930: Switches
- 5935: Connectors, Electrical
- 5940: Lugs, Terminals, and Terminal Strips
- 5945: Relays and Solenoids
- 5950: Coils and Transformers
- 5955: Oscillators and Piezoelectric Crystals
- 5960: Electron Tubes and Associated Hardware
- 5961: Semiconductor Devices and Associated Hardware
- 5962: Microcircuits, Electronic
- 5963: Electronic Modules
- 5965: Headsets, Handsets, Microphones and Speakers
- 5970: Electrical Insulators and Insulating Materials
- 5975: Electrical Hardware and Supplies
- 5977: Electrical Contact Brushes and Electrodes
- 5980: Optoelectronic Devices and Associated Hardware
- 5985: Antennas, Waveguides, and Related Equipment
- 5990: Synchros and Resolvers
- 5995: Cable, Cord, and Wire Assemblies: Communication Equipment
- 5996: Amplifiers
- 5998: Electrical and Electronic assemblies, Boards, Cards, and Associated Hardware
- 5999: Miscellaneous Electrical and Electronic Components

== Group 60: Fiber Optics Materials, Components, Assemblies, and Accessories ==
- 6004: Rotary Joints
- 6005: Couplers, Splitters, and Mixers
- 6006: Attenuators
- 6007: Filters
- 6008: Optical Multiplexers/Demultiplexers
- 6010: Fiber Optic Conductors
- 6015: Fiber Optic Cables
- 6020: Fiber Optic Cable Assemblies and Harnesses
- 6021: Fiber Optic Switches
- 6025: Fiber Optic Transmitters
- 6026: Fiber Optic Receivers
- 6029: Optical Repeaters
- 6030: Fiber Optic Devices
- 6031: Integrated Optical Circuits
- 6032: Fiber Optic Light Sources and Photo Detectors
- 6033: Fiber Optic Photo Detectors
- 6034: Fiber Optic Modulators/Demodulators
- 6035: Fiber Optic Light Transfer and Image Transfer Devices
- 6040: Fiber Optic Sensors
- 6050: Fiber Optic Passive Devices
- 6060: Fiber Optic Interconnectors
- 6070: Fiber Optic Accessories and Supplies
- 6080: Fiber Optic Kits and Sets
- 6099: Miscellaneous Fiber Optic Components

== Group 61: Electric Wire, and Power and Distribution Equipment ==
- 6105: Motors, Electrical
- 6110: Electrical Control Equipment
- 6115: Generators and Generator Sets, Electrical
- 6116: Fuel Cell Power Units, Components, and Accessories
- 6117: Solar Electric Power Systems
- 6120: Transformers: Distribution and Power Station
- 6125: Converters, Electrical, Rotating
- 6130: Converters, Electrical, Nonrotating
- 6135: Batteries, Non-rechargeable
- 6140: Batteries, Rechargeable
- 6145: Wire and Cable, Electrical
- 6150: Miscellaneous Electric Power and Distribution Equipment
- 6160: Miscellaneous Battery Retaining Fixtures, Liners and Ancillary Items

== Group 62: Lighting Fixtures and Lamps ==
- 6210 - Indoor and Outdoor Electric Lighting Fixtures
- 6220 - Electric Vehicular Lights and Fixtures
- 6230 - Electric Portable and Hand Lighting Equipment
- 6240 - Electric Lamps
- 6250 - Ballasts, Lampholders, and Starters
- 6260 - Non-Electrical Lighting Fixtures

== Group 63: Alarm, Signal and Security Detection Systems ==
- 6310: Traffic and Transit Signal Systems
- 6320: Shipboard Alarm and Signal Systems
- 6330: Railroad Signal and Warning Devices
- 6340: Aircraft Alarm and Signal Systems
- 6350: Miscellaneous Alarm, Signal, and Security Detection Systems

== Group 65: Medical, Dental, and Veterinary Equipment and Supplies ==
- 6505: Drugs and Biologicals
- 6508: Medicated Cosmetics and Toiletries
- 6509: Drugs and Biologicals, Veterinary Use
- 6510: Surgical Dressing Materials
- 6515: Medical and Surgical Instruments, Equipment, and Supplies
- 6520: Dental Instruments, Equipment, and Supplies
- 6525: Imaging Equipment and Supplies: Medical, Dental, Veterinary
- 6530: Hospital Furniture, Equipment, Utensils, and Supplies
- 6532: Hospital and Surgical Clothing and Related Special Purpose Items
- 6540: Ophthalmic Instruments, Equipment, and Supplies
- 6545: Replenishable Field Medical Sets, Kits, and Outfits
- 6550: In Vitro Diagnostic Substances, Reagents, Test Kits and Sets

== Group 66: Instruments and Laboratory Equipment ==
- 6605: Navigational Instruments
- 6610: Flight Instruments
- 6615: Automatic Pilot Mechanisms and Airborne Gyro Components
- 6620: Engine Instruments
- 6625: Electrical and Electronic Properties Measuring and Testing Instruments
- 6630: Chemical Analysis Instruments
- 6635: Physical Properties Testing and Inspection
- 6636: Environmental Chambers and Related Equipment
- 6640: Laboratory Equipment and Supplies
- 6645: Time Measuring Instruments
- 6650: Optical Instruments, Test Equipment, Components and Accessories
- 6655: Geophysical Instruments
- 6660: Meteorological Instruments and Apparatus
- 6665: Hazard-Detecting Instruments and Apparatus
- 6670: Scales and Balances
- 6675: Drafting, Surveying, and Mapping Instruments
- 6680: Liquid and Gas Flow, Liquid Level, and Mechanical Motion Measuring Instruments
- 6685: Pressure, Temperature, and Humidity Measuring and Controlling Instruments
- 6695: Combination and Miscellaneous Instruments

== Group 67: Photographic Equipment ==
- 6710: Cameras, Motion Picture
- 6720: Cameras, Still Picture
- 6730: Photographic Projection Equipment
- 6740: Photographic Developing and Finishing Equipment
- 6750: Photographic Supplies
- 6760: Photographic Equipment and Accessories
- 6770: Film, Processed
- 6780: Photographic Sets, Kits, and Outfits

== Group 68: Chemicals and Chemical Products ==
- 6810: Chemicals
- 6820: Dyes
- 6830: Gases: Compressed and Liquefied
- 6840: Pest Control Agents and Disinfectants
- 6850: Miscellaneous Chemical Specialties

== Group 69: Training Aids and Devices ==
- 6910: Training Aids
- 6920: Armament Training Devices
- 6930: Operation Training Devices
- 6940: Communication Training Devices

== Group 70: Automatic Data Processing Equipment (Including Firmware), Software, Supplies and Support Equipment ==
- 7010: ADPE System Configuration
- 7020: ADP Central Processing Unit (CPU, Computer), Analog
- 7021: ADP Central Processing Unit (CPU, Computer), Digital
- 7022: ADP Central Processing Unit (CPU, Computer), Hybrid
- 7025: ADP Input/ Output and Storage Devices
- 7030: ADP Software
- 7035: ADP Support Equipment
- 7040: Punched Card Equipment
- 7042: Mini and Micro Computer Control Devices
- 7045: ADP Supplies
- 7050: ADP Components

== Group 71: Furniture ==
- 7105: Household Furniture
- 7110: Office Furniture
- 7125: Cabinets, Lockers, Bins, and Shelving
- 7195: Miscellaneous Furniture and Fixtures

== Group 72: Household and Commercial Furnishings and Appliances ==
- 7210: Household Furnishings
- 7220: Floor Coverings
- 7230: Draperies, Awnings, and Shades
- 7240: Household and Commercial Utility Containers
- 7290: Miscellaneous Household and Commercial Furnishings and Appliances

== Group 73: Food Preparation and Serving Equipment ==
- 7310: Food Cooking, Baking, and Serving Equipment
- 7320: Kitchen Equipment and Appliances
- 7330: Kitchen Hand Tools and Utensils
- 7340: Cutlery and Flatware
- 7350: Tableware
- 7360: Sets, Kits, Outfits and Modules, Food Preparation and Serving

== Group 74: Office Machines, Text Processing Systems and Visible Record Equipment ==
- 7420: Accounting and Calculating Machines
- 7430: Typewriters and Office Type Composing Machines
- 7435: Office Information System Equipment
- 7450: Office Type Sound Recording and Reproducing Machines
- 7460: Visible Record Equipment
- 7490: Miscellaneous Office Machines

== Group 75: Office Supplies and Devices ==
- 7510: Office Supplies
- 7520: Office Devices and Accessories
- 7530: Stationery and Record Forms
- 7540: Standard Forms

== Group 76: Books, Maps, and Other Publications ==
- 7610: Books and Pamphlets
- 7630: Newspapers and Periodicals
- 7640: Maps, Atlases, Charts, and Globes
- 7641: Aeronautical Maps, Charts and Geodetic Products
- 7642: Hydrographic Maps, Charts and Geodetic Products
- 7643: Topographic Maps, Charts and Geodetic Products
- 7644: Digital Maps, Charts and Geodetic Products
- 7650: Drawings and Specifications
- 7660: Sheet and Book Music
- 7670: Microfilm, Processed
- 7690: Miscellaneous Printed Matter

== Group 77: Musical Instruments, Phonographs, and Home-Type Radios ==
- 7710: Musical Instruments
- 7720: Musical Instrument Parts and Accessories
- 7730: Phonographs, Radios, and Television Sets: Home Type
- 7735: Parts and Accessories of Phonographs, Radios, and Television Set: Home Type
- 7740: Phonograph Records

== Group 78: Recreational and Athletic Equipment ==
- 7810: Athletic and Sporting Equipment
- 7820: Games, Toys, and Wheeled Goods
- 7830: Recreational and Gymnastic Equipment

== Group 79: Cleaning Equipment and Supplies ==
- 7910: Floor Polishers and Vacuum Cleaning Equipment
- 7920: Brooms, Brushes, Mops, and Sponges
- 7930: Cleaning and Polishing Compounds and Preparations

== Group 80: Brushes, Paints, Sealers, and Adhesives ==
- 8010 - Paint (there are different NSNs for Full Gloss, Semi-Gloss, or Flat versions of the same shade and different NSNs for amounts in pint- or gallon-sized paint cans and 10 oz. or 16 oz. spray paint cans).
- 8020 - Paint and Artists' Brushes
- 8030 - Preservative and Sealing Compounds
- 8040 - Adhesives

== Group 81: Containers, Packaging, and Packing Supplies ==
- 8105: Bags and Sacks
- 8110: Drums and Cans
- 8115: Boxes, Cartons, and Crates
- 8120: Commercial and Industrial Gas Cylinders
- 8125: Bottles and Jars
- 8130: Reels and Spools
- 8135: Packaging and Packing Bulk Materials
- 8140: Ammunition and Nuclear Ordnance Boxes, Packages and Special Containers
- 8145: Specialized Shipping and Storage Containers
- 8150: Freight Containers

== Group 83: Textiles, Leather and Furs, Apparel and Shoe Findings, Tents, and Flags ==
- 8305: Textile Fabrics
- 8310 - Yarn and Thread
- 8315 - Notions and Apparel Findings
- 8320 - Padding and Stuffing Materials
- 8325 - Fur Materials
- 8330 - Leather Materials
- 8335 - Shoe Findings and Soling Materials
- 8340 - Tents and Tarpaulins
- 8345 - Flags and Pennants

== Group 84: Clothing, Individual Equipment, and Insignia ==
- 8405: Outerwear, Men's
- 8410: Outerwear, Women's
- 8415: Clothing, Special Purpose
- 8420: Underwear and Nightwear, Men's
- 8425: Underwear and Nightwear, Women's
- 8430: Footwear, Men's
- 8435: Footwear, Women's
- 8440: Hosiery, Handwear, and Clothing Accessories, Men's
- 8445: Hosiery, Handwear, and Clothing Accessories, Women's
- 8450: Children's and Infants' Apparel and Accessories
- 8455: Badges and Insignia
- 8460: Luggage
- 8465: Individual Equipment
- 8470: Armor, Personal
- 8475: Specialized Flight Clothing and Accessories

== Group 85: Toiletries ==
- 8510: Perfumes, Toilet Preparations, and Powders
- 8520: Toilet Soap, Shaving Preparations, and Dentifrices
- 8530: Personal Toiletry Articles
- 8540: Toiletry Paper Products

== Group 87: Agricultural Supplies ==
- 8710: Forage and Feed
- 8720: Fertilizers
- 8730: Seeds and Nursery Stock

== Group 88: Live Animals ==
- 8810: Live Animals, Raised for Food.
- 8820: Live Animals, Not Raised for Food.

== Group 89: Subsistence ==
- 8905: Meat, Poultry, and Fish
- 8910: Dairy Foods and Eggs
- 8915: Fruits and Vegetables
- 8920: Bakery and Cereal Products
- 8925: Sugar, Confectionery, and Nuts
- 8930: Jams, Jellies, and Preserves
- 8935: Soups and Bouillons
- 8940: Special Dietary Foods and Food Specialty Preparations
- 8945: Food, Oils and Fats
- 8950: Condiments and Related Products
- 8955: Coffee, Tea, and Cocoa
- 8960: Beverages, Nonalcoholic
- 8965: Beverages, Alcoholic
- 8970: Composite Food Packages
- 8975: Tobacco Products

== Group 91: Fuels, Lubricants, Oils, and Waxes ==
- 9110: Fuels, Solid
- 9130: Liquid Propellants and Fuels, Petroleum Base
- 9135: Liquid Propellant Fuels and Oxidizers, Chemical Base
- 9140: Fuel Oils
- 9150: Oils and Greases: Cutting, Lubricating, and Hydraulic
- 9160: Miscellaneous Waxes, Oils, and Fats

== Group 93: Nonmetallic Fabricated Materials ==
- 9310: Paper and Paperboard
- 9320: Rubber Fabricated Materials
- 9330: Plastics Fabricated Materials
- 9340: Glass Fabricated Materials
- 9350: Refractories and Fire Surfacing Materials
- 9390: Miscellaneous Fabricated Nonmetallic Materials

== Group 94: Nonmetallic Crude Materials ==
- 9410: Crude Grades of Plant Materials
- 9420: Fibers: Vegetable, Animal, and Synthetic
- 9430: Miscellaneous Crude Animal Products, Inedible
- 9440: Miscellaneous Crude Agricultural and Forestry Products
- 9450: Nonmetallic Scrap, Except Textile

== Group 95: Metal Bars, Sheets, and Shapes ==
- 9505: Nonelectrical Wires
- 9510: Bars and Rods
- 9515: Plate, Sheet, Strip, Foil, and Leaf
- 9520: Structural Shapes
- 9525: Wire, Nonelectrical, Nonferrous Base Metal
- 9530: Bars and Rods, Nonferrous Base Metal
- 9535: Plate, Sheet, Strip, and Foil; Nonferrous Base Metal
- 9540: Structural Shapes, Nonferrous Base Metal
- 9545: Plate, Sheet, Strip, Foil, and Wire: Precious Metal

== Group 96: Ores, Minerals, and Their Primary Products ==
- 9610: Ores
- 9620: Minerals, Natural and Synthetic
- 9630: Additive Metal Materials
- 9640: Iron and Steel Primary and Semi-finished Products
- 9650: Nonferrous Base Metal Refinery and Intermediate Forms
- 9660: Precious Metals Primary Forms
- 9670: Iron and Steel Scrap
- 9680: Nonferrous Scrap

== Group 99: Miscellaneous ==
- 9905: Signs, Advertising Displays, and Identification Plates
- 9910: Jewelry
- 9915: Collectors' and/or Historical Items
- 9920: Smokers' Articles and Matches
- 9925: Ecclesiastical Equipment, Furnishings, and Supplies
- 9930: Memorials; Cemetery and Mortuary Equipment and Supplies
- 9999: Miscellaneous Items.

== See also ==
- National Codification Bureau
- Federal Stock Number
- National Stock Number
- NATO Stock Number
- National Item Identification Number
- NATO Item Identification Number
