= United States Army Foreign Science and Technology Center =

The United States Army Foreign Science and Technology Center (FSTC) was an intelligence production agency located, for much of its existence, in Charlottesville, Virginia. The organization and early history of FSTC are outlined in a 1977 official history. In the 1960s, FSTC was housed in the Munitions Building (no longer a standing building) on Constitution Avenue in Washington, DC. FSTC produced scientific and technical intelligence concerning ground forces weapons, equipment, and technology of foreign armies. Most of the effort was on enemies and potential enemies of the United States. FSTC provided scientific and technical intelligence in support of military commanders, materiel developers, and of Department of the Army, Department of Defense, and National-level decision makers.

FSTC was established on 1 August 1962. It was created using personnel and resources belonging to Army Technical Services intelligence agencies:

- The US Army Chemical Corps Intelligence Agency
- The United States Army Ordnance Technical Intelligence Agency
- The US Army Quartermaster Intelligence Agency
- The US Army Signal Corps Intelligence Agency
- The US Army Transportation Intelligence Agency

as well as intelligence resources from the Army Corps of Engineers and the Technical Intelligence Field Agency by Para X, DAGO 46, 1962.

At the same time, some of the intelligence resources from the Army Technical Services intelligence agencies were used to create the US Army Area Analysis Intelligence Agency (AAIA). A short time later the AAIA was absorbed by the new Defense Intelligence Agency. AAIA was "discontinued as a Department of the Army" activity by Para I, DAGO 12, 1963.

The predecessor agencies had grown out of the intelligence staffs created in the offices of the Chiefs of the Army Technical Services shortly before World War II. FSTC was created to consolidate Army technical intelligence activities when Secretary of Defense Robert McNamara's reorganizations in the early 1960s restructured Army procurement and supply activities and eliminated several of the Army Technical Services. (Department of the Army General Order 47, DA, 26 July 1962) FSTC was made subordinate to the US Army Materiel Command which was created as the main procurement agency of the Army in place of the Army Technical Services. "The McNamara Revolution" is described in detail in From Root To McNamara by James E. Hewes Jr. (Washington: Center of Military History, 1975. Chapters VIII, IX, and X, Pages 296–365).

The new Center found a home in the Munitions Building on the Mall in Washington, DC. When President Nixon ordered that the Munitions Building be demolished in 1970, FSTC relocated to a federal building in downtown Charlottesville, Virginia. During the move, part of FSTC was temporarily located in Building T-7 (a World War II temporary building no longer standing) at Gravelly Point near Washington National Airport. Once needed building modifications were completed, the remainder of the organization was moved to Charlottesville.

On 1 July 1984, command of FSTC was transferred to the US Army Intelligence Agency, a field operating agency subordinate to the Office of the Assistant Chief of Staff for Intelligence, Army General Staff by DAGO 18, 1984.

On 12 October 1991 the US Army Intelligence Agency was reassigned to the US Army Intelligence and Security Command (INSCOM) by INSCOM PO 79–1, 1991.

On 10 April 1992, FSTC was reassigned from the Army Intelligence Agency to the United States Army Intelligence and Security Command by INSCOM PO 41–2, 1992.

On 8 July 1994, FSTC and the US Army Intelligence and Threat Analysis Center were merged. The new organization, named the National Ground Intelligence Center, with its headquarters in Charlottesville, Virginia, was created as a "provisional" organization by INSCOM PO 41–1, 1994. On 1 October 1995, the National Ground Intelligence Center was confirmed as an official, permanent Army organization by INSCOM P0 234–1, 1995.

Data concerning the size of FSTC throughout its existence is not available. However, some information is available. A count of the entries in the October 1963 telephone directory showed 348 persons working at FSTC and its "field activities."

Official documents concerning FSTC from its founding through 1983 are listed in an official Historical Data Card The Tables of Distribution and Allowance listed on the Historical Data Card show the strength of FSTC. In January 1967, the total workforce included 401 persons (63 officers, 2 warrant officers, 3 enlisted men, and 333 civilian workers) according to Table of Distribution and Allowance M1-WOKPAA-00, 15 January 1967. By October 1984, the workforce had grown to 529 (35 officers, 8 enlisted men, and 486 civilians) according to Table of Distribution and Allowance XKWOKPAA, X10185, 2 October 1984.
