= Snatch Land Rover =

Land Rover Snatch
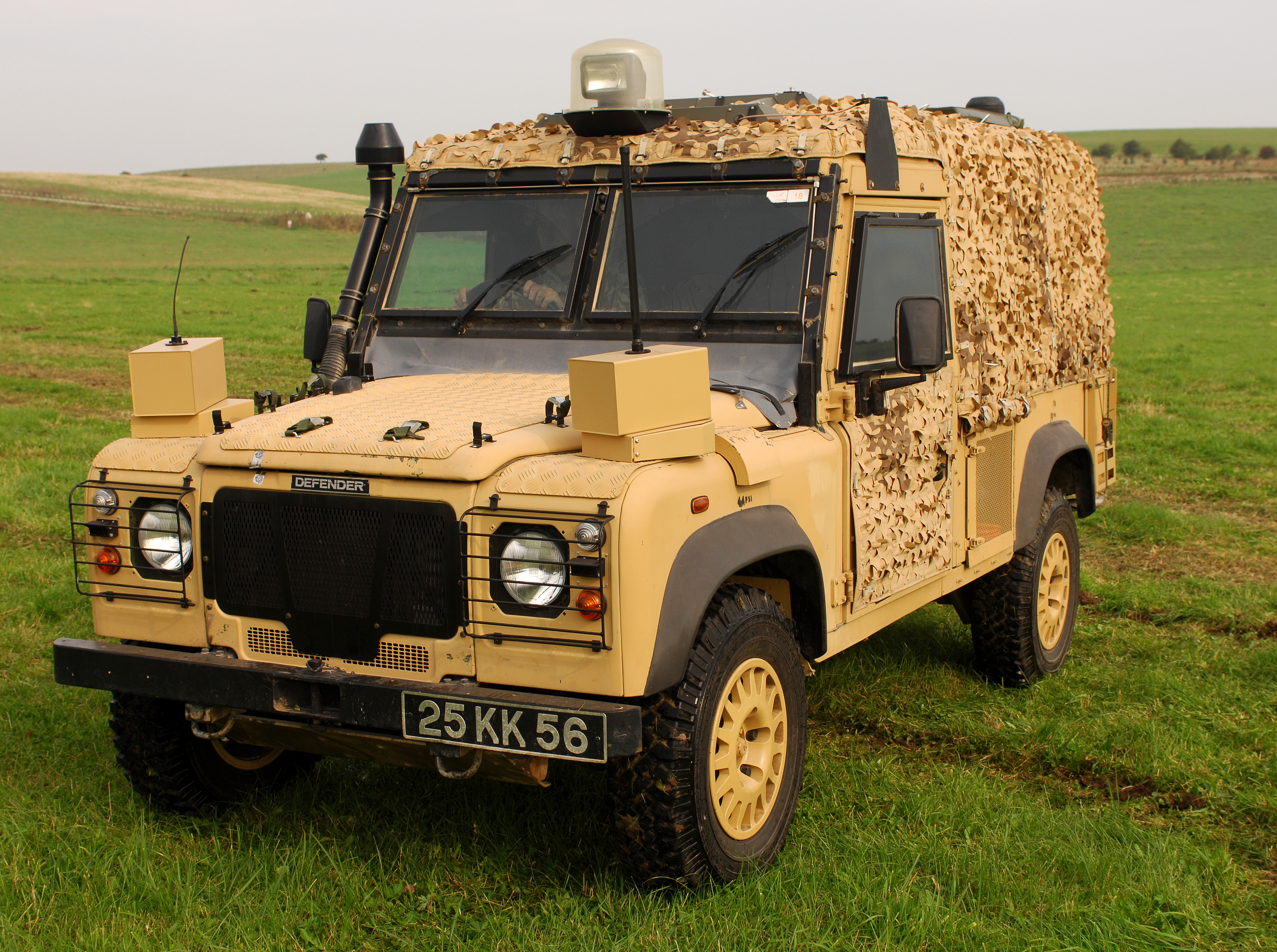
- The Land Rover Snatch-Vixen vehicle on show at the Urgent Operational Requirement (UOR) Equipment Demonstration in Salisbury, Wiltshire.
- Type: Armoured SUV
- Place of origin: United Kingdom

Production history
- Unit cost: £50,000 + armour
- Produced: 1992–
- No. built: 991
- Variants: Snatch-1.5; Snatch-2 12v, LHD; Snatch-2A 24v, RHD; Snatch-2B 24v, RHD

Specifications
- Mass: 4,050 kilograms (8,930 lb)
- Length: 4.55 metres (14 ft 11 in)
- Width: 1.79 metres (5 ft 10 in)
- Height: 2.03 metres (6 ft 8 in)
- Main armament: none – personal weapons carried by "top cover"
- Engine: Land Rover 300 Tdi engine 111 horsepower (83 kW)
- Power/weight: 37 hp/tonne
- Suspension: Wheel 4×4
- Operational range: 510 kilometres (320 mi)
- Maximum speed: 60 miles per hour (97 km/h)

The Snatch Land Rover is a protected patrol vehicle based on the Land Rover Defender 110 chassis. Intended for general patrolling in low-threat areas, the vehicle was developed in 1992 for use in Northern Ireland. It provides a limited degree of small arms protection for occupants and a limited level of protection from Improvised Explosive Devices and off-route mines.

The vehicle has been criticised as occupant deaths have resulted from kinetic attacks which exceeded the level of protection available.

== Overview ==
The Snatch is based on the Land Rover Heavy Duty Chassis, a militarised version of the Defender 110 (also used for the Land Rover Wolf). It was originally procured for use in Northern Ireland by the British Army and was first introduced in 1992.

Officially designated Truck Utility Medium (TUM) with Vehicle Protection Kit (VPK), the vehicle is more widely known by its informal title, the "Snatch", even in official documentation. It is believed to have acquired the name from its use in the Troubles, when it was the preferred vehicle for snatch squads: soldiers trained to deal with demonstrations by picking out and arresting suspected ringleaders.

The "Snatch" was the first factory modified Land Rover to be used in Northern Ireland, replacing a series of ad hoc conversions including protected Airportable Land Rover (Land Rover 1/2 ton Lightweight) and 109" (known as the "piglet", being a smaller version of the Humber Pig armoured personnel carrier) then widely used by British Forces in Northern Ireland.

Manufactured as the CAMAC CAV 100 by NP Aerospace, the "Snatch" conversion was developed with the aid of Ricardo, and is fitted with CAMAC composite armour to offer the crew protection against kinetic energy projectiles and, to a very limited degree, against explosive devices. Its rated "combat weight" (without crew and weapons) is 3,050 kg.

Six versions have been produced, the first being the original Snatch-1, equipped with a V8 petrol engine. Nearly 1,000 were produced, with 278 being "desertised" and reclassified as the Snatch-1.5. Most were upgraded to a second variant standard, either

- the Snatch-2 12v, LHD, the basic training variant;
- the Snatch-2A 24v, RHD, "Rest of World variant"; or
- the Snatch-2B 24v, RHD – the N. Ireland variant.

These later versions were retro-fitted with "300 Tdi" diesel engines and the 2A is also fitted with air conditioning.

Some Snatch 2 are being further upgraded to the Snatch Vixen standard with chassis and drivetrain enhancements for a higher gross vehicle weight.

When deployed, the vehicles are often fitted with electronic countermeasure suites, which are designed to prevent certain types of improvised explosive devices (IEDs) being triggered, and Bowman radios.

== Criticism of vehicle use ==
Use of the vehicle has been the subject of criticism by the media, politicians and the families of some casualties in both the Afghan and Iraqi areas of British operations. This criticism became public knowledge in 2005 when the media published claims from civil servants in the Foreign & Commonwealth Office and Department for International Development advising against the use of the vehicles.

Later concerns were raised in Parliament, presenting comparison with the U.S. Marine Corps deployment of the Mine Resistant Ambush Protected (MRAP) Cougar, which appeared to have provided more protection. The conservative peer Lord Astor of Hever raising the comparison and inviting comment. In response the Minister for Defence Procurement, Lord Drayson, acknowledged that the Snatch was inappropriate but identified that trade-offs around protection and mobility were required, as well as highlighting previous maintainability issues with an earlier version of the Cougar. Similar issues were then reported in a Sunday Telegraph opinion piece and other news outlets. These also recognised the need for trade-off decisions to be made around posture and mobility.

Media reporting continued to escalate the topic whilst parliamentary dialogue continued.

Four families of servicemen killed in Snatch Land Rovers in Iraq and Afghanistan are to sue the Ministry of Defence, as reported by the BBC on 19 June 2009. Since 2003, some 37 UK personnel have been killed while using the vehicles.

The use of the Snatch in Afghanistan and Iraq has caused troops to name it a "Mobile Coffin".

== Procurement of additional vehicles ==
In 2010 the MoD was in the process of procuring a number of vehicles with increased levels of protection, although of reduced mobility, to supplement the vehicle fleets in Afghanistan and Iraq. Existing orders for the Pinzgauer Vector and the Bulldog, based on the FV432, were increased. New vehicles, the Mastiff (6×6) and Ridgback (4×4), based on the Cougar, which is produced by the US firm Force Protection Inc, are under procurement. Some of these vehicles have been delivered and deployed to theatre. The UK MoD is also procuring 420 Panther CLV 4×4 vehicles in the Command and Liaison role. Mine and IED protection are prime features on this vehicle. In September 2010, Force Protection Europe, developer of the Ocelot light armoured vehicle, has been selected as the preferred bidder in U.K. Ministry of Defence (MoD) Light Protected Patrol Vehicle (LPPV) programme. According to FPE, the first Ocelot vehicles are expected to be available for the training of UK forces in 2011. The initial phase will require up to 400 new vehicles to be delivered by 2010–2011. FPE won this competition against the all-British Supacat group, offering the Supacat Protected Vehicle (SPV) SPV-400. The Ocelot has an approximate gross vehicle weight of only 16,500 pounds. Its cabin is made of a protective pod, made of advanced composite materials incorporating Formula One racing technology. Critical components such as the engine, fuel tank and transmission are contained in the V-shaped armoured 'spine' that deflects potential blast away from the pod, thus protecting the occupants and critical key components.

== Replacement ==
Former British Prime Minister, Gordon Brown, announced on 6 March 2010, during his surprise visit to troops in Afghanistan, that the Snatch Land Rover would be replaced by a new "light patrol vehicle". This new vehicle was revealed by the Ministry of Defence as the Ocelot on 22 September 2010.

In 2011 it was confirmed that an unmanned variant of the vehicle is a component of the Talisman route clearing system intended to counter IED attack. The vehicle is known as the Panama remote controlled vehicle and is used to forward mount a sensor suite to avoid the need for EOD operators to dismount.

== Snatch Public Order Upgrade Programme Ovik 'Phoenix' ==
In the wake of the 2011 riots in the UK and the success of the Pangolin Armoured Public Order Vehicles used in Northern Ireland, some British police forces approached the OVIK Group to recycle former Snatch Land Rovers into cost effective Public Order Vehicles. This led to the creation of the Phoenix – B6+ Armoured Vehicle.

Refit

The refit takes up to 340 work hours to complete. This includes full engine and transmission refurbishment, significant upgrades to all brakes, addition of full 'public order kit' which included hardening of all doors, wings and bonnet, external fire protection system and finally protected emergency lighting, siren and radio system installed. This vehicle is currently in service with Avon and Somerset police.

Some of the options available to customers included:

- Impact resistant bonnet and wings.
- Armoured front radiator grille.
- Steel headlight and tail light protection.
- Front side and rear drop-down under-skirt.
- Heavy duty windscreen protection grille.
- Heavy duty side screen protection.
- Fire and explosive protection for fuel lines and tank.
- Choice of left or right hand drive
