= Earwire =

Part of an earring

Handmade and commercial French loops.

An earwire is a bow of wire, looped to fasten an earring to a pierced ear. It is generally made of precious metal or hypoallergenic surgical steel. Earwires are available commercially, as jewelry findings, but some jewelers make their own. Earwires and similar forms can be made with simple wire wrap techniques. There are a variety of both commercial and homemade jigs to improve the uniformity and speed of creation. A simple homemade jig can be made with a block of wood and several nails, smooth metal pins or bolts.

== Styles ==
- Kidney wires pass through the earlobe and hook onto themselves and form a closed loop.
- French loops pass through the earlobe but do not fasten at the back, instead relying on gravity to hold them in the wearer's ear.
- Omega clips are a combination between earwires and posts. While a post passes through the earlobe, a hinged wire (often shaped like the Greek letter Omega) flips up from the back of the earring to the back of the earlobe in order to secure the post in place of a friction back. The Omega mechanism is similar to that used in clip-on earrings for non-pierced ears.
