= National Codification Bureau =

NATO organizations

The National Codification Bureaus or NATO Codification Bureaux (NCB) are a NATO organization that oversees the management of the NATO Codification System (NCS). It is governed by NATO Allied Committee 135 (AC/135), with each member nation's National Codification Bureau controlling and issuing its own unique NATO Stock Numberss. NATO or European Union membership is not required to do so. Non-NATO (or "Partner") countries can be allowed to join if recommended, vetted, and approved by AC/135.

Countries that participate in the NATO Codification System (NCS) follow common standards and techniques to assign NATO Stock Numbers (NSNs) to items of supply in their defense inventory. The National Codification Bureau (NCB) within each country centrally assigns their national NSNs. The assignment of an NSN denotes a distinctive item of supply; to eliminate confusion, the number will never be re-used.

== NATO Stock Number ==
The NATO Stock Number (NSN) system was implemented by the United States on September 30, 1974, replacing the United States' Federal Stock Number system (1949–1974). It was managed by the Defense Integrated Data System in 1975.

All NSNs are uniform in composition, length, and structure. Each is represented by 13 characters XXXXXXXXXXXXX which is commonly formatted to highlight each functional block as XXXX-XX-XXX-XXXX.

The NSN is also supported as a product identifier by Schema.org, which defines an nsn property for NATO Stock Numbers.

A NSN can be divided into two functional parts:

=== NATO Supply Classification Group ===
The first four characters XXXX are the Federal Supply Classification Group (FSCG) / NATO Supply Classification Group (NSCG) code. This relates the item to the Federal Supply Group (FSG) / NATO Supply Group (NSG) (characters 1 & 2) and the Federal Supply Class (FSC) / NATO Supply Class (NSC) (characters 3 & 4) of similar items that it belongs to. For examples, see List of NATO Supply Classification Groups.

The NATO Supply Classification Group can change over time as the database is maintained.

=== NATO Item Identification Number ===
The last 9 characters are the National Item Identification Number / NATO Item Identification Number (NIIN). The NIIN XXXXXXXXX may be commonly formatted as XX-XXX-XXXX.

The NIIN of a stock item never changes. So while the FSC may change over time causing the NSN to change, the NIIN remains constant. The NIIN is therefore the "primary key" or unique "Stock Keeping Unit (SKU)" of the NATO Stock Number System.

The NIIN was 9 Numeric Digits until the year 2000. Since 2000, the specification for the NSN has changed so that any character can be alphanumeric with valid characters of 0 through 10 and A through Z. It is customary to keep all characters uppercase.

The NIIN can be divided into two function parts:

=== National Codification Bureau ===
The first two digits indicate the National Codification Bureau (NCB) that codified (assigned) the NIIN. The NCB Code has been informally called a "Country Code" or "Nation Code". Each country has one or more two-character NCB codes. There was some vanity in the assignment of these codes, for example some countries such as USA, France, Germany, Italy and Spain choosing their International Telephone Dialing Country Code while other Countries chose codes that have some meaning within their country's culture such as 99 for the United Kingdom. The NCB Codes were not, as some have reported, granted in the order the NCB system was adopted by that country.

THE NCB does not indicate who uses or stocks an item. Any nation or organization that participates in the NATO Stock Number system may use or stock any item. The NCB only indicates which Codification Bureau performed the initial codification. It is actually the prime directive of the system for any stock item to only be codified once while being used by all users. A continuous process of elimination of duplicates and very-near duplicates is performed to minimize the inventories of the using members.

The United States of America re-classified all of their pre-NCB System (pre-1974) Federal Supply Numbers(FSN) with the 00 NCB code as the NCB System was launched. The United States of America have NCB codes 00 through 10 reserved for their use and currently are using NCBs of 00 and 01.

Canada re-classified all of their pre-NCB System (pre-1974) Canadian Supply Numbers(CSN) with the 20 NCB code as the NCB System was launched. Canada currently uses NCBs of 20 and 21.

Some NCB are actively used for special reasons such as LL, LN and LF in the USA.

Some NCB are assigned outside of the NATO Database for Commercial Uses such as CA, CB, CC and CD.

National Codification Bureaus can be suspended and reinstated for many reasons including politics. Examples are the recent suspension of Afghanistan when the Taliban formed a Government in 2021 and the Russian Federation after the Russian invasion of Ukraine in 2014.

=== Non-Significant Number ===
The final seven characters (dubbed the "non-significant number" - but used without an acronym to avoid confusion with "NATO Stock Number") are randomly assigned. They indicate a code for the unique item within the codifying Country's management system.

The "non-significant number" is divided logically into two parts; the firsts 3 characters are the "interfix" which is a notional code for a "batch" of items which are sequenced by the last 4 characters. The two parts being commonly formatted with a hyphen separator XXX-XXXX. The notions of "non-significant number", "interfix" and "batch" are non-longer relevant to modern codification as they originate from the days of Punch-Cards and Mainframe Computers. Modern databases are quite happy with simply having the 9 character NIIN as a key.

=== Current List of NCB Codes ===
Country	NCB Code(s)	Status
USA	00 and 01	NATO
Unassigned (USA)	02 through 10	n/a
NATO-standard items	11	n/a
West Germany / Germany	12	NATO
Belgium	13	NATO
France	14	NATO
Italy	15	NATO
Czechoslovakia / Czech Republic	16	NATO
Netherlands	17	NATO
South Africa	18	Tier 1
Brazil	19	Tier 2
Canada	20 and 21	NATO
Denmark	22	NATO
Greece	23	NATO
Iceland	24	NATO
Norway	25	NATO
Portugal	26	NATO
Turkey	27	NATO
Luxembourg	28	NATO
Argentina	29	Tier 2
Japan	30	Tier 1
Israel	31	Tier 2
Singapore	32	Tier 2
Spain	33	NATO
Malaysia	34	Tier 2
Thailand	35	Tier 1
Egypt	36	Tier 1
Republic of Korea	37	Tier 2
Estonia	38	NATO
Romania	39	NATO
Slovakia	40	NATO
Austria	41	Tier 2
Slovenia	42	NATO
Poland	43	NATO
United Nations-standard items	44	n/a
Indonesia	45	Tier 2
Philippines	46	Other
Lithuania	47	NATO
Fiji	48	Other
Tonga	49	Other
Bulgaria	50	NATO
Hungary	51	NATO
Chile	52	Tier 1
Croatia	53	NATO
North Macedonia	54	NATO
Latvia	55	NATO
Oman	56	Tier 1
Russian Federation	57	Other
Finland	58	NATO
Albania	59	NATO
Kuwait	60	Other
Ukraine	61	Tier 2
Belarus	62	Tier 2
Morocco	63	Tier 1
Sweden	64	NATO
Papua, New Guinea	65	Other
Australia	66	Tier 2
Afghanistan	67	Other
Georgia	68	Tier 1
?	69	n/a
Saudi Arabia	70	Tier 1
United Arab Emirates	71	Tier 2
India	72	Tier 1
Serbia	73	Tier 2
Pakistan	74	Other
Bosnia-Herzegovina	75	Tier 1
Brunei	76	Tier 1
Montenegro	77	NATO
Jordan	78	Tier 1
Peru	79	Tier 1
Colombia	80	Tier 2
Qatar	81	Tier 1
Algeria	82	Other
New Zealand	98	Tier 2
United Kingdom	99	NATO

== Federal Stock Number ==
The Federal Stock Number (FSN) was the codification system used by the US Government from 1957 to 1974. It was 11 digits long and was the same number as the NSN (see National Stock Number), minus the two-digit NCB code. The digits "00" were later added in the place of the NCB digits to virtually all FSN numbers to create compliant American 13-digit NSN numbers.

The FSN was officially replaced by the NATO Stock Number beginning on September 30, 1974.

=== Removal from the NCS ===
On 1 April 2014, NATO unanimously decided to suspend co-operation with the Russian Federation, in response to the Russo-Ukrainian war. On 18 February 2017, the Russian Minister of Foreign Affairs Sergey Lavrov said he supported the resumption of military cooperation with the NATO alliance.

=== Software Suppliers ===
BULCOD

CSIS - Codification Support Information System

MC CATALOGUE: an AURA Product

N-CORE NG: an ESG Group Product

SICAD

SIAC

SPCAT II
