= United States Army Ordnance Technical Intelligence Agency =

Former U.S. government intelligence agency

The US Army Ordnance Technical Intelligence Agency (OTIA) was a small special-purpose intelligence agency assigned to the Chief of Ordnance in the Headquarters, Department of the Army. It was established effective 1 September 1957 in Washington, D.C., as the Ordnance Technical Intelligence Agency by Paragraph I of DAGO 44, 1957. The Ordnance Technical Intelligence Agency was created with iles and personnel previously belonging to the intelligence staff in the Office of the Chief of Ordnance that had been organized during World War II. The scope and activities of the intelligence staff in the Office of the Chief of Ordnance are described in four semiannual reports available in the National Archives.

"Ordnance is fighting equipment. It is the weapons, the ammunition, the armored and transport vehicles that give an armed force its striking power in battle." The Ordnance Technical Intelligence Agency produced scientific and technical intelligence concerning the ordnance used by foreign ground forces, intelligence about ordnance organizations in foreign ground forces, and intelligence about ordnance industries in foreign countries.

Although much of the work of Ordnance intelligence was administrative or for internal use, examples of intelligence produced by the organization are available, such as:

A. Translations to assist with analysis and testing foreign weapons. Some examples produced by ordnance intelligence are:

- Foreign Firing Tables (FT-F-82-1) for Soviet Mortar 82 mm..., March 1951
- Foreign Firing Tables (FT-F-122-2) for Soviet Gun, Self-Propelled, 122 mm, ..., March 1951
- Foreign Firing Tables (FT-F-50) for Soviet Gun, Tank..., June 1951

B. During World War II, technical intelligence organizations were instructed to prepare manuals for foreign weapons and equipment. See Paragraph II, Section 7, Subsections c and d of "Processing of Captured Materiels for Intelligence Purposes." Manuals on foreign equipment published by the Army Technical Services were distributed like manuals on US equipment. They are often available in the government documents collections of major libraries. Some examples produced by ordnance intelligence are:

- Technical Manual TM-E 9-369A, German 88-mm Antiaircraft Gun Materiel, 1943.
- Technical Manual TM-E 9-325A, German 105-mm Howitzer Materiel. 1944.
- Technical Manual TM-E 9-228, 2-cm Flakvierling 38 (German 20-mm Antiaircraft Gun, four-barreled mount), 1943.

C. Collections of Material Contributed to by Army Technical Intelligence organizations.

- DA Pamphlet 30-28, A Guide to the Collection of Technical Intelligence.
- DA Pamphlet 30-50-2, Handbook on the Satellite Armies, 1 April 1960.
- DA Pamphlet 30-51, Handbook on the Communist Chinese Army, December 7, 1960.
- DA Pampblet 30-115, Weaapons and Equipment Recognition Handbook, Middle East., 1950.
- Technical Manual TM 30-410, Handbook on the British Army..., 1942.
- Technical Manual TM-E 30-451, Handbook on German Military Forces, 1945.
- Technical Manual TM-E 30-480, Handbook on Japanese Military Forces, 1944.
- A manual on USSR military forces was published during World War II. However, the chapter on Soviet ordnance is missing. Apparently, it was not published, or it has never been declassified.

The agency was redesignated the "US Army Ordnance Technical Intelligence Agency" in late 1957 or early 1958. According to a list of tenants of Arlington Hall Station (AHS), Virginia, in 1958, the agency was relocated to AHS on 6 February 1958.

In 1962, the organization was discontinued, with its functions, personnel, records and equipment concerned with technical intelligence transferred to the United States Army Foreign Science and Technology Center (FSTC), and functions, personnel, etc. concerned with ordnance industries in foreign countries transferred to the US Army Area Analysis Intelligence Agency in accordance with DA Reorganizational Planning Directive 381-2, 1962. The organization was formally transferred to FSTC by Paragraph X of DAGO 46, 1962.

The organizational history of the Ordnance Technical Intelligence Agency is recorded on an official Historical Data card.
