= NATO Codification System =

Standard approach to monitor supplies

The NATO Codification System (NCS) is a standardization agreement approach to identify, classify, and number items of supply. This applies to repetitively used and stocked items (e.g., repair parts, equipment, food, etc.). The System has been agreed upon by all signatories of the NATO and sponsored non-NATO nations for use in identifying equipment and supplies. The result is a unique identification and a data set that can be easily shared and understood by a wide range of users. The data set may be shared in the form of printed catalogs, online systems, electronic data exchange, etc. Users include logisticians and manufacturers.

The process of codification (or cataloging) involves naming, classifying, describing the item, and assigning of a 13 digit NATO Stock Number (or NSN). The system aids logistics processes such as supply, purchasing, maintenance, warehousing, transportation, planning, etc. Further, it allows different organizations and countries to cooperate in providing logistics support to military, disaster relief, peacekeeping, and other operations.

== NCS Documents ==
Five NATO Standardisation Agreements (STANAGs) build the structural basis for the system:

- STANAG 3150: Codification-Uniform System of Supply Classification
- STANAG 3151: Codification-Uniform System of Item of Supply Identification
- STANAG 4177: Codification-Uniform System of Data Acquisition
- STANAG 4199: Codification-Uniform System of Exchange of Materiel Management Data
- STANAG 4438: Codification-Uniform System of Dissemination of Data Associated with NATO Stock Numbers(NSN)

== NCS Basics ==
Unambiguous item identification in accordance with the STANAG 3151 standard. This identification takes place utilizing a NATO Stock Number (NSN), which is composed of a 4-digit NATO Supply Classification Code, a 2-digit code for the National Codification Bureau (NCB) representing the country that codifies the item, and a 7-digit non-significant number that is assigned by this NCB.

Uniform System of Supply Classification in accordance with STANAG 3150. All material is classified into material groups and classes concerning its usage in logistics.

Uniform System of Item Names in accordance with the H6 manual (Item Name Directory). Approximately 40,000 approved item names are used, covering all types of material.

Item identification:

- A descriptive item identification according to the Item Identification Guide (IIG) based on material-technical attributes specification.
- A reference item identification based on the manufacturer’s code, NCAGE, and of the manufacturer’s item identification number.

=== Item of Supply ===
Item of supply (IoS) is an item of production (part, article) which a responsible supply management authority has determined as being required to meet a specific logistics requirement. This part has to be defined in compliance with logistics needs (transport, usage, features, etc.) to meet all logistics requirements with the possibility of repeated usage. One item of supply may represent several items of production, for example, made by various producers, which do not have to be distinguished from the viewpoint of logistics requirements.

== NATO AC135 Sponsored Training ==
The NATO Allied Committee 135 governs accredited training on the NATO Codification System

=== Traditional Courses (NCB College) ===
1. Managers and Directors, and
2. Codifiers and Logisticians

=== Online Distance Learning Courses ===
1. Course: Introduction to the NATO Codification System
2. Course: The Classification of Items of Supply
3. Course: Item Names
4. Course: Item Identification
5. Course: Reference Numbers
6. Course: NCAGEs
7. Course: Cancellation-Reinstatement

For further information on NATO-sponsored training, contact the AC135 NATO Codification Secretary

== NCS Software & Service Providers ==
- BULCOD
- CSIS - Codification Support Information System
- MC CATALOGUE: an AURA Product
- N-CORE NG: an ESG Group Product
- SIAC
- SICAD
- SPCAT II

== Resources ==
- The Group of National Directors on Codification
- Guide to the NATO Codification System
- MC CATALOGUE
- NATO Codification of Logistics Information in the Czech Republic
- N-CORE NG
- United Kingdom National Codification
