= Finding (jewelcrafting) =

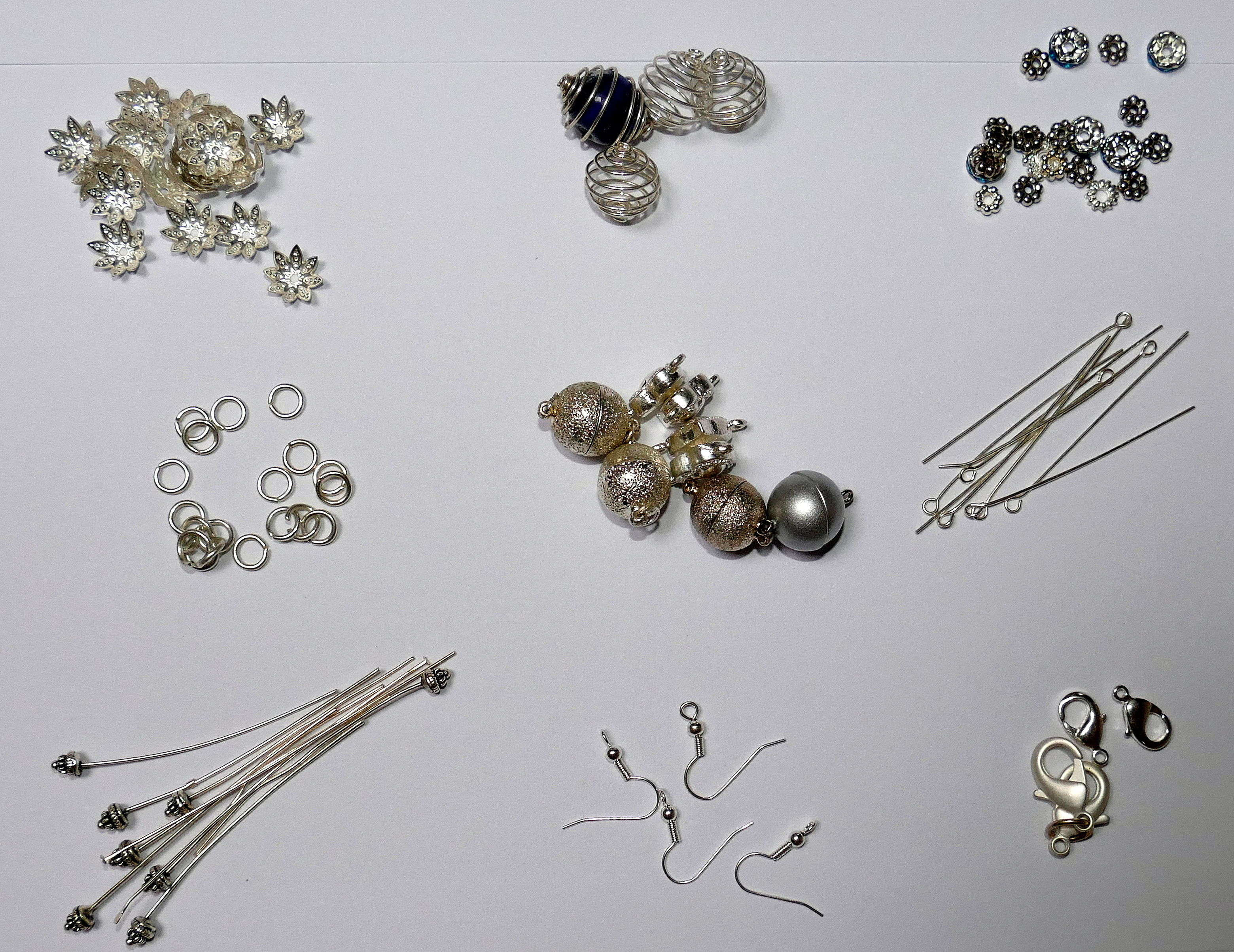
Silver jewellery findings

Jewellery findings are the parts used to join jewellery components together to form a completed article.

== Types ==
- Clasps to complete necklaces and bracelets
- Earwires to link an earring to the wearer's ear
- Ring blanks for making finger rings
- Bails, metal loops, and jump rings, for completing jewellery. Jump rings can be used by themselves for chains
- Pin stems and brooch assemblies
- Tuxedo stud findings, letters of the alphabet, cluster settings, metal beads and balls
- Plastic, fabric or metal stringing material for threading beads

Findings are available in all the jewellery metals—sterling silver, plated silver, gold, niobium, titanium, aluminium, and copper.
