= Jump rings =

Rings used to make chains, jewelry and chain mail

Jump rings are (usually metal) rings used to make chains, jewellery and chain mail. They are made by wrapping wire around a mandrel to make a coil, then cutting the coil with wire cutters to make individual rings. The rings can be assembled one by one into chains, earrings, objects such as bowls or ornaments, and chain mail clothing.

The making of items from jump rings is called chain maille ("maille" is French for "mesh").

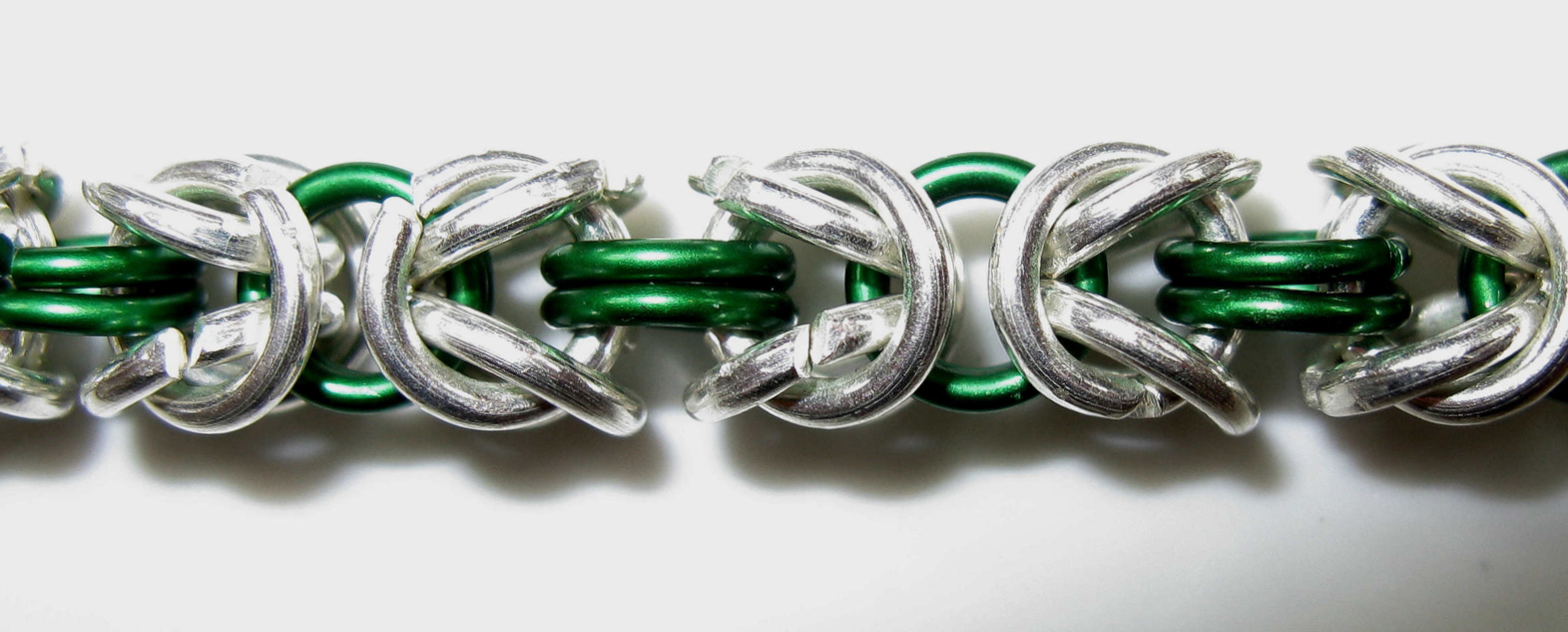
Part of a chain maille bracelet, in Byzantine weave, made from silver plated copper and green anodised aluminium jump rings

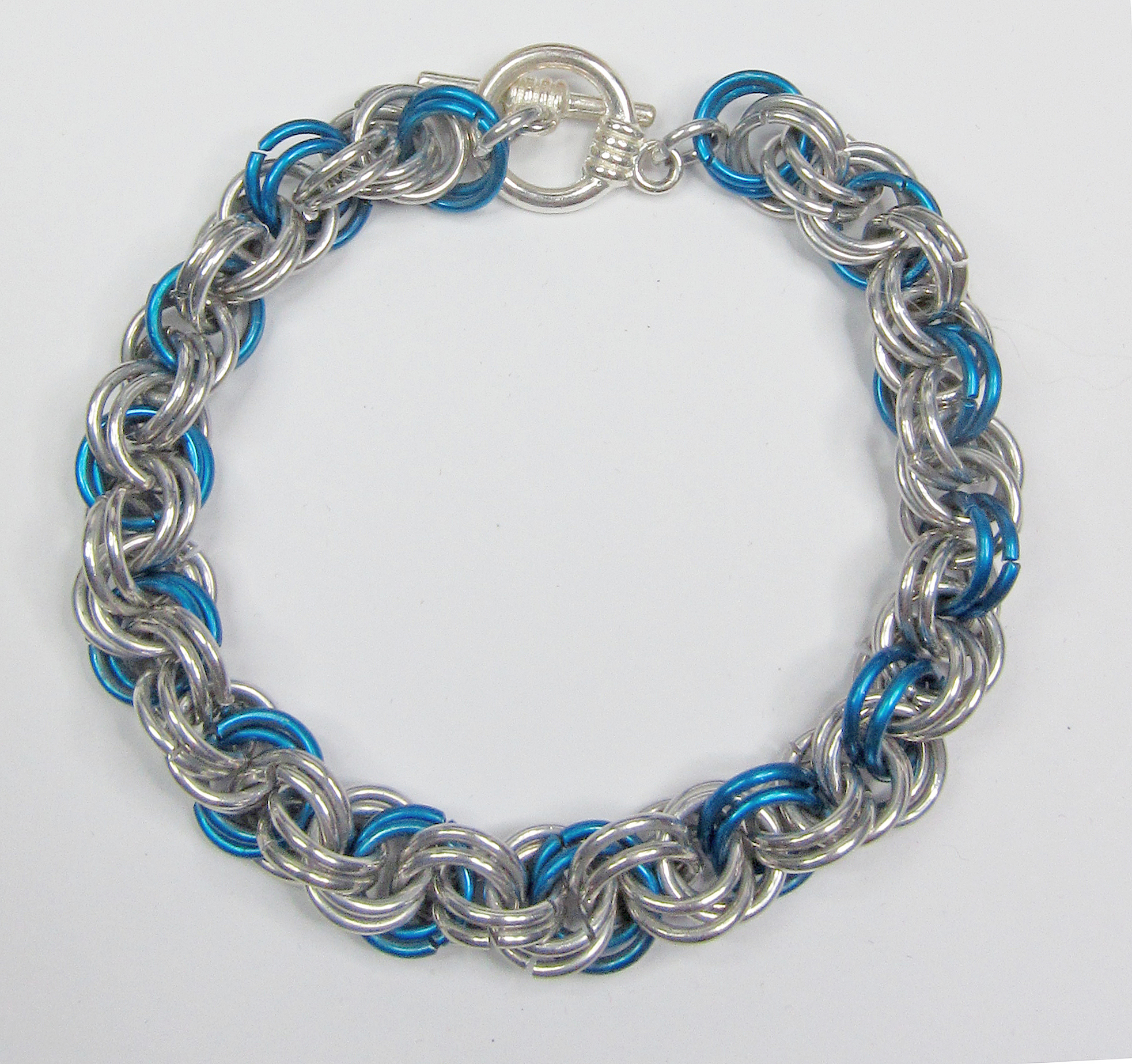
Chain maille bracelet using silver plated and blue anodized rings. The weave is double spiral.

Jump rings can be described by the following qualities:

Gauge	The thickness of the wire the ring is made from. Measured according to American wire gauge standards, SWG (standard wire gauge), or in millimetres.
Inner diameter	Approximately the same as the outer diameter of the mandrel used to create the rings, but the exact inner diameter will depend on the degree to which the wire springs as it comes off the mandrel.
Kerf width	The gap between the ends of the jump ring created by the cutting process
Cut type	Saw cut or pinched. The former produces a clean uniform cut whereas the latter is pinched and looks less attractive.
Outer diameter	The outer diameter of the ring. This is the same as (twice the gauge + the inner diameter).
Colour	For example, anodised aluminium rings come in many colours.
Material	The common materials are gold (or plated gold), silver (or plated silver), aluminium, brass, stainless steel, copper, niobium and titanium.
