= Planar transformer =

Type of SMPS transformer

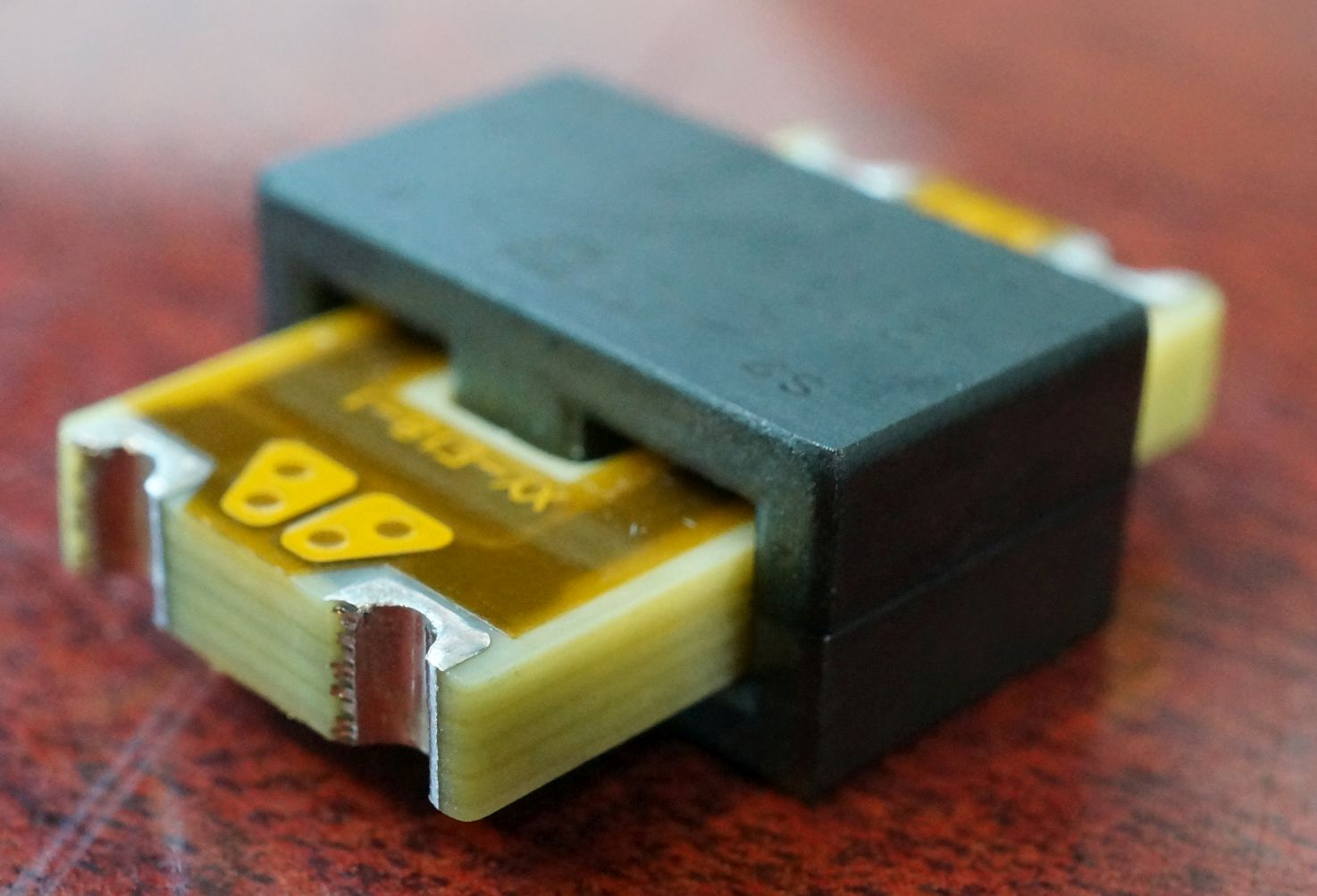
Planar Transformer

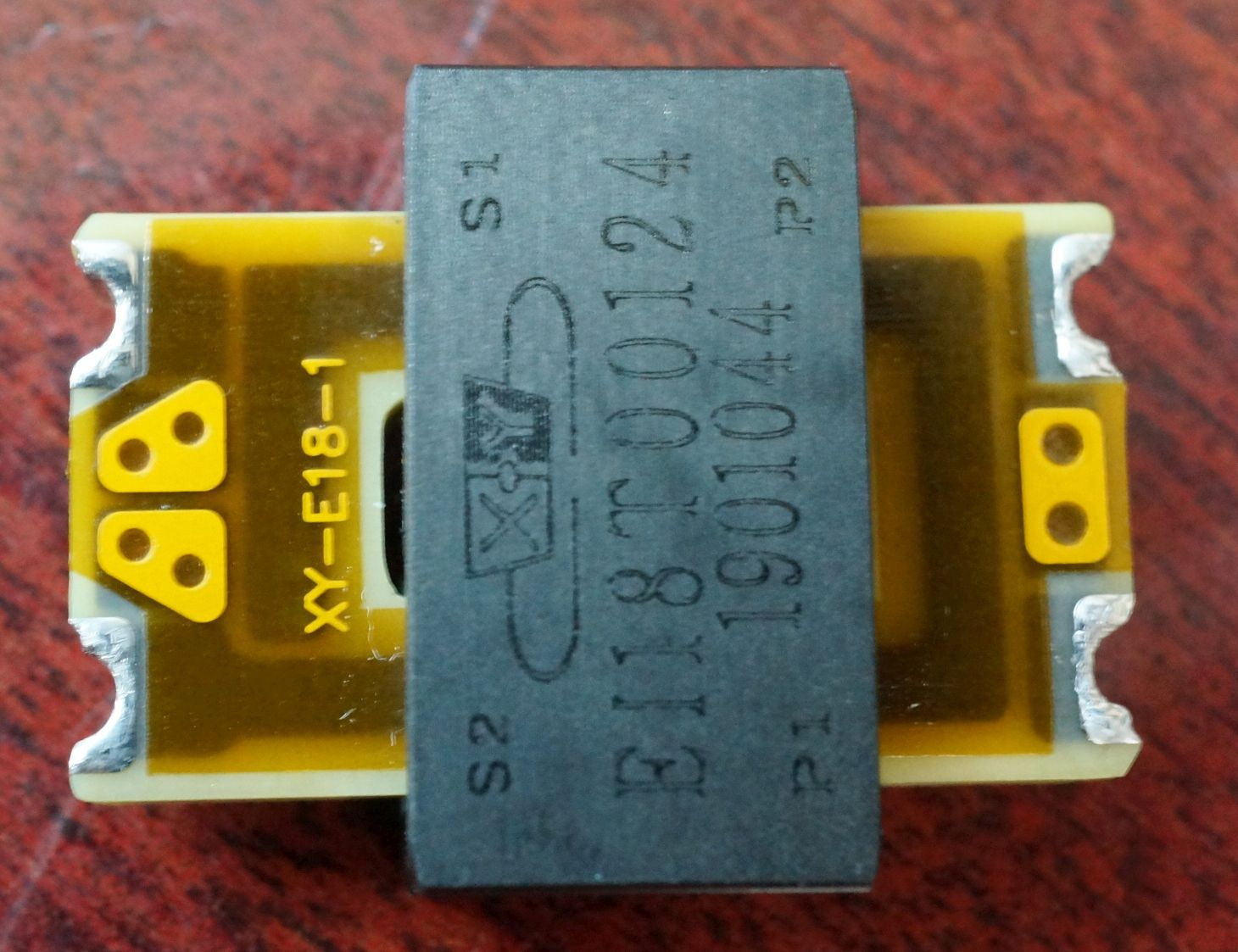
Planar Transformer Top View

Planar transformers are high frequency transformers used in isolated switchmode power supplies operating at high frequency. As opposed to conventional "wire-wound-on-a-bobbin" transformers, planar transformers usually contain winding turns made of thin copper sheets riveted together at the ends of turns in the case of high current windings, or windings etched on a PCB in a spiral form. As the current conductors are thin sheets of copper, the operating frequency is not limited by skin effect. As such, high power converters built with planar transformers can be designed to operate at relatively high switching frequencies, often 100 kHz or above. This reduces the size of required magnetic components and capacitors, thereby increasing power density.
