= Litz wire =

High frequency optimised electric wire

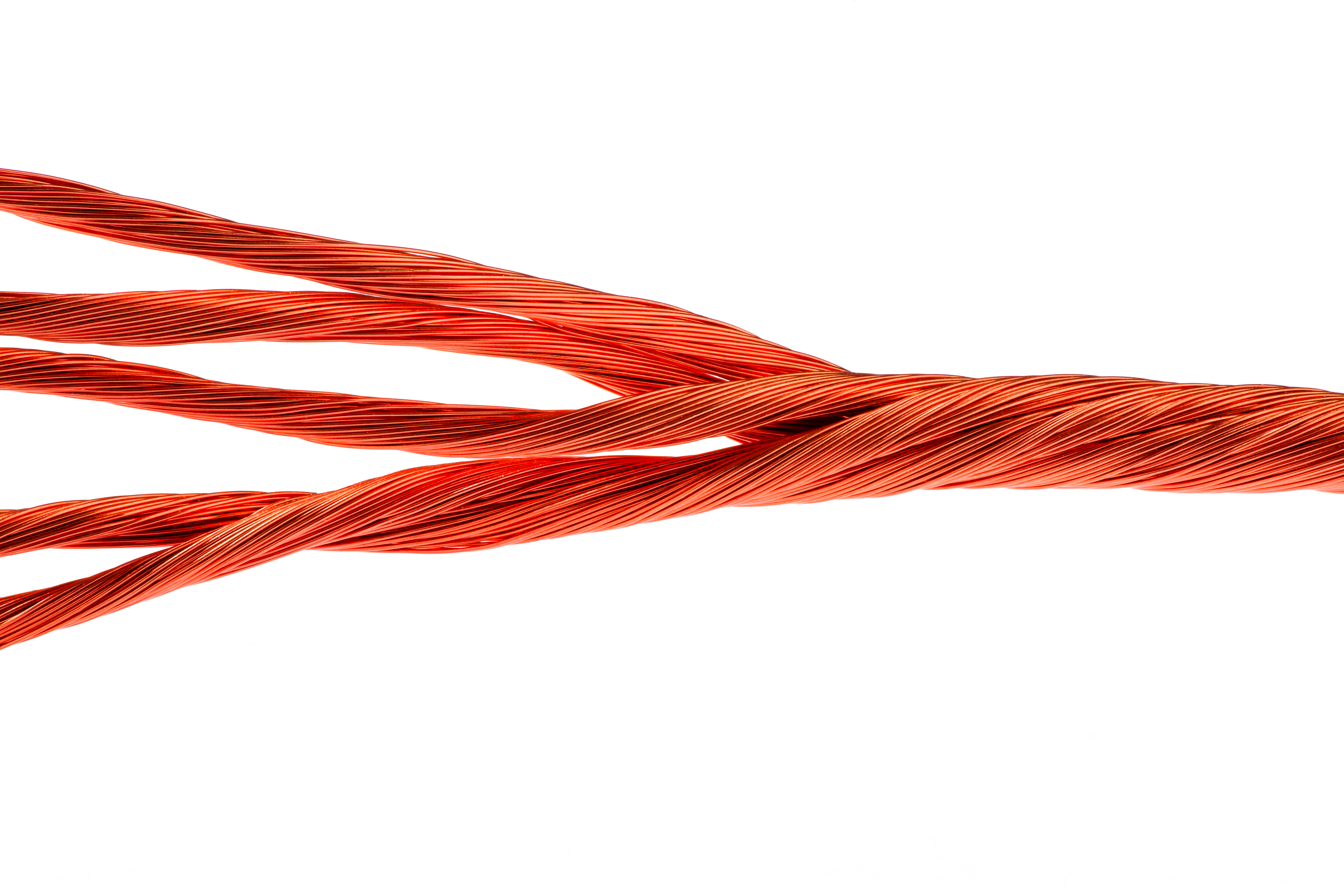
Litz wire twisted of enamel-coated strands

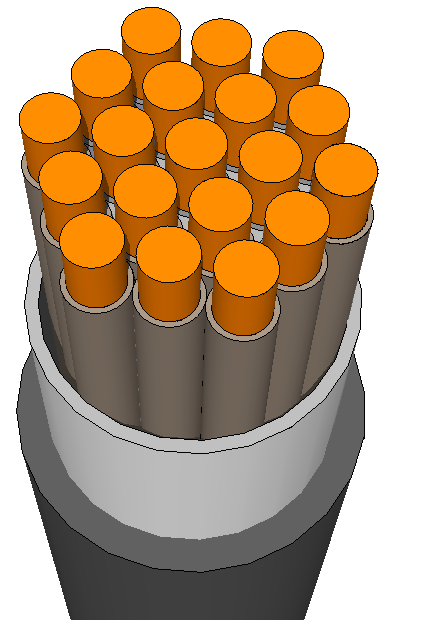
Litz wire consists of multiple strands insulated electrically from each other. Ordinarily the strands are twisted or woven, but no twisting is shown in this diagram.

Litz wire is a particular type of multistrand wire or cable used in electronics to carry alternating current (AC) at radio frequencies. The wire is designed to reduce losses due to the skin effect and proximity effect at frequencies up to about 1 MHz.

It consists of many thin wire strands, individually insulated and twisted or woven together, following one of several carefully prescribed patterns often involving several levels of bundling (already-twisted wires are twisted together into small bundles, which are then twisted into larger bundles, etc.). The result of these winding patterns is to equalize the proportion of the overall length over which each strand is at the outside of the conductor. This has the effect of distributing the current equally among the wire strands, reducing the impedance.

Litz wire is used in high-Q inductors for radio transmitters and receivers operating at low frequencies, induction heating equipment, and switching power supplies.

The term litz wire originates from Litzendraht (coll. Litze), German for 'braided/stranded wire' or 'woven wire'.

== Principle of operation ==
The skin effect and proximity effect cause conductors to exhibit higher resistance to alternating current (AC) than to direct current (DC). Due to the dual inverse nature of the electromagnetic field, the skin effect dominates at frequencies less than about 2 MHz; at higher frequencies, the proximity effect becomes the dominant force, and Litz wire induces more DC losses than solid wire or tube conductors.

=== Skin effect ===
The resistance of a conductor depends on its cross-sectional area; a conductor with a larger area has a lower resistance for a given length. However at high frequencies, alternating current (AC) does not penetrate deeply into conductors due to eddy currents induced in the material; it tends to flow near the surface. This is the skin effect. Therefore, in a solid conductor like a wire, current tends to flow primarily in a layer or annulus at the surface, and less current flows through the material near the center of the wire. Since less of the cross-sectional area of the wire is being used, the resistance of the wire is greater than it is for direct current (DC). The higher the frequency of the current, the smaller the depth to which the current penetrates, and the current is "crowded" into an increasingly smaller cross-sectional area along the surface, so the AC resistance of wire increases with frequency.

The depth to which AC current penetrates in a conductor is determined by a parameter called the skin depth, which is the depth at which the current is reduced to 1/e ≈ 37% of its surface value. The skin depth decreases with frequency. At low frequencies, where the skin depth is larger than the diameter of the wire, the skin effect is negligible and the current distribution and resistance are virtually the same as in DC. As the frequency rises and the skin depth gets smaller than the wire diameter, skin effect becomes significant, the current is increasingly concentrated near the surface, and the resistance per unit length of the wire increases above its DC value. Some examples of skin depth in copper wire at different frequencies are:

- At 60 Hz, the skin depth of a copper wire is about 7.6 mm (0.30 inches).
- At 60,000 Hz (60 kHz), the skin depth of copper wire is about 0.25 mm (0.0098 inches).
- At 6,000,000 Hz (6 MHz), the skin depth of copper wire is about 25 μm (0.00098 inches).

Round conductors such as wire larger than a few skin depths do not conduct much current near their axes, so the metal located at the central part of the wire is not used effectively.

=== Proximity effect ===
In applications where multiple wires carrying the same current lie side-by-side, such as in inductor and transformer windings, the proximity effect causes additional current crowding, resulting in an additional increase in the resistance of the wire with frequency. In two wires running parallel next to each other, the magnetic field of the adjacent wire induces longitudinal eddy currents in the wire, which causes the current to be concentrated in a narrow strip on the side of the wire. In adjacent conductors carrying AC current in the same direction, it causes the current in the conductor to concentrate on the side away from the nearby conductor. In conductors carrying AC current in opposite directions, it causes the current in the conductor to concentrate on the side adjacent to the nearby conductor. This has a similar effect as the skin effect; the current is crowded into a smaller cross-sectional area of the wire, so the resistance increases.

=== How Litz wire works ===
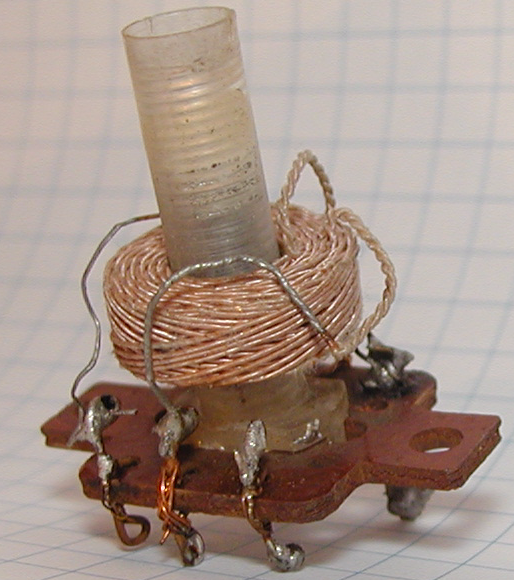
An IF transformer with basket winding

One technique to reduce the resistance is to place more of the conductive material near the surface where the current is by replacing the wire with a hollow tube of the same cross-sectional area. The larger surface area of the tube conducts the current with much less resistance than a solid wire with the same cross-sectional area would. The tank coils of high-power radio transmitters are often made of copper tubing, silver plated on the outside, to reduce resistance. However, tubing is not flexible and requires special tools to bend and shape.

Litz wire is another method, which employs a stranded wire with individually insulated conductors, forming a bundle. Each thin conductor is less than a skin-depth, so an individual strand does not suffer an appreciable skin effect loss. The strands must be insulated from each other – otherwise all the wires in the bundle would short together, behave like a single large wire, and still have skin effect problems. Furthermore, the strands cannot occupy the same radial position in the bundle over long distances: the electromagnetic effects that cause the skin effect would still disrupt conduction. The weaving or twisting pattern of the wires in the bundle is designed so that the individual strands are on the outside of the bundle for a distance where the electromagnetic field changes are smaller and the strand sees low resistance, and are on the inside of the bundle for a distance where the EM field changes are the strongest and the resistance is higher. If all the strands have a comparable electrical impedance, then current is distributed equally to every strand in the cable. This allows the interior of the litz wire to contribute to the overall conductivity of the bundle.

Another way to explain the benefit of litz braiding is as follows: the magnetic fields generated by current flowing in the strands are in directions such that they have a reduced tendency to generate an opposing electromagnetic field in the other strands. Thereby, for the wire as a whole, the skin effect and associated power losses when used in high-frequency applications are reduced. The ratio of distributed inductance to distributed resistance is increased, relative to a solid conductor, resulting in a higher Q factor at these frequencies.

== Effectiveness ==
Litz wire is very effective below 500 kHz; it is rarely used above 2 MHz as it is much less effective there.

At frequencies above about 1 MHz, the benefits become gradually offset by the effect of parasitic capacitance between the strands. At microwave frequencies, the skin depth is much smaller than the diameter of the strands, and the current that is forced through the inner strands induces strong eddy currents in the outer strands, which negates the benefits of litz wire to the point where it performs much worse than solid wire of the same diameter.

Litz wire has a higher impedance per unit cross-sectional area, but litz wires can be used at thicker cable sizes, hence reducing or maintaining cable impedance at higher frequencies. Construction of litz wires usually involves extremely fine wires often available with a silver plate or solid silver. The individual strands often make use of a low-temperature lacquer coating that typically requires silver-solder-iron temperatures to melt – which is removed when making connections. The bundles of wires can also use silk outer insulation.

== Applications ==
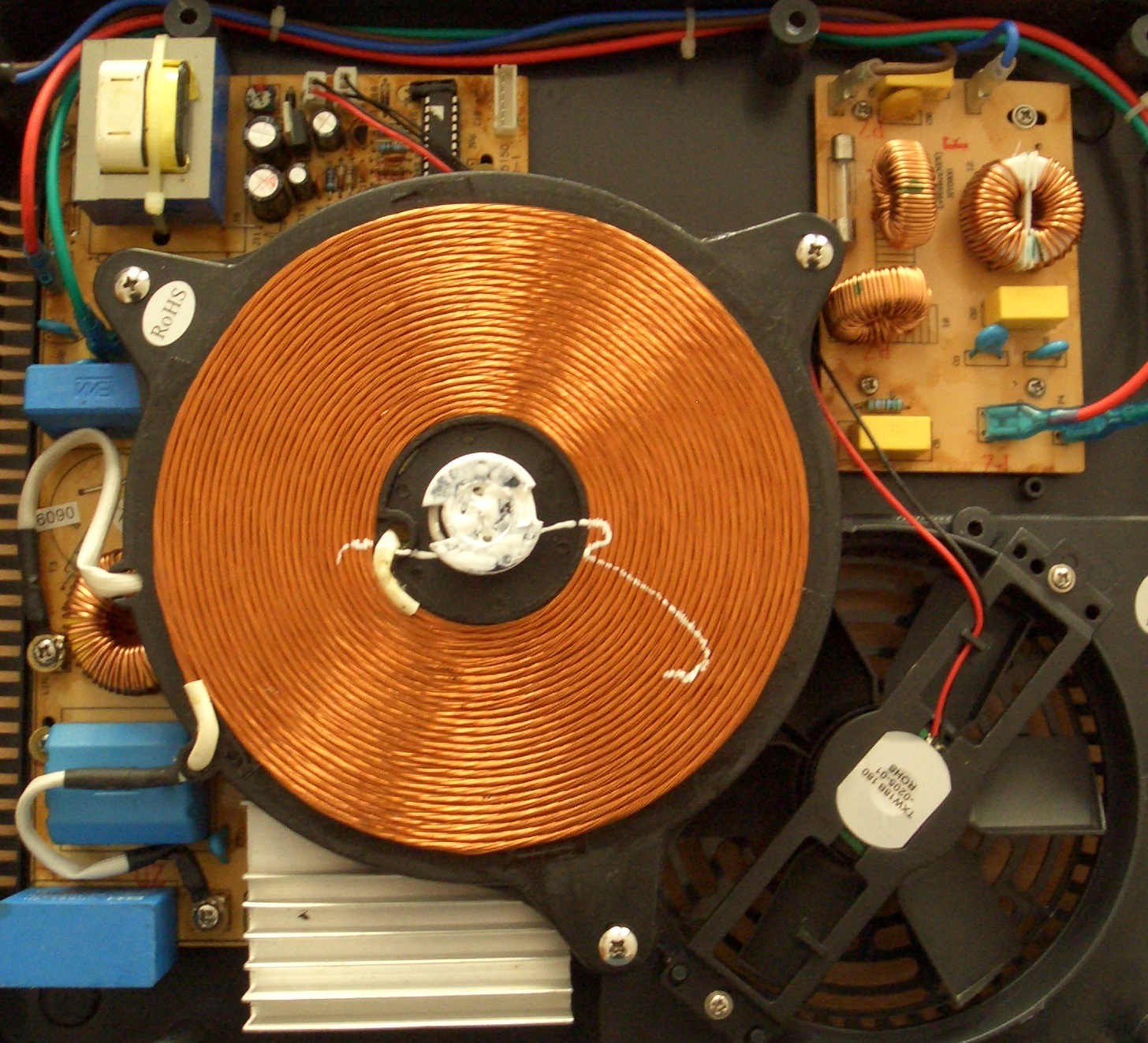
Disassembled induction cooker showing litz wire coil

Litz wire is used to make inductors and transformers, especially for high-frequency applications where the skin effect is more pronounced and the proximity effect can be an even more severe problem. Litz wire is one kind of stranded wire, but, in this case, the reason for its use is not the usual one of avoiding complete wire breakage due to material fatigue.

Litz wire is frequently found in power applications in frequencies ranging between lower tens to higher hundreds kilohertz, namely induction cookers and transmitters of inductive chargers (e.g. the Qi standard). Multiple parallel twisted strands of enameled wires can be found also in transformers in some switching power supplies.

=== WWVB transmitting station ===
NIST uses litz wire in the time code broadcasting station WWVB. The station transmits on 60 kHz. Litz wire is used for the helix and variometer in both helix houses. It consists of 9 × 5 × 5 × 27 (totaling 6,075) strands of #36 AWG (0.127 mm [0.0050 in] diameter) magnet wire and multiple layers of cotton, hemp, and plastic insulation, in a cable 19 mm (3/4 inch) in diameter, totaling 151,875 circular mils (0.7695619839 cm^{2}) of copper.

== See also ==
- Tinsel wire – Fatigue resistant low-current electrical wire

== Cited works ==
- Butterworth, S. (August 1926), "Effective Resistance of Inductance Coils at Radio Frequency", Wireless and Wireless Eng., 3: 483
- Hansen, Peder M.; Gish, Darrell (February 1995), "WWVB Antenna and Antenna Tuning System: Baseline Measurements" (PDF), Naval Command, Control and Ocean Surveillance Center (Technical report), Technical Report 1693, archived from the original on 14 April 2016
- Sullivan, Charles R. (March 1999), "Optimal Choice for Number of Strands in a Litz-Wire Transformer Winding" (PDF), IEEE Transactions on Power Electronics, 14 (2): 283–291, Bibcode:1999ITPE...14..283S, doi:10.1109/63.750181
- Terman, Frederick E. (1943), Radio Engineers' Handbook, McGraw-Hill, pp. 37, 74, 80
- Wojda, Rafal P. (September 2016), "Winding resistance and power loss for inductors with litz and solid-round wires", Power Electronics and Motion Control Conference (PEMC), 2016 IEEE International, IEEE, doi:10.1109/EPEPEMC.2016.7752107
