= Proximity effect (electromagnetism) =

Magnetically induced effect in AC conductors

In electromagnetics, proximity effect is a redistribution of electric current occurring in nearby parallel electrical conductors carrying alternating current (AC) current, caused by magnetic effects. In adjacent conductors carrying AC current in the same direction, it causes the current in the conductor to concentrate on the side away from the nearby conductor. In conductors carrying AC current in opposite directions, it causes the current in the conductor to concentrate on the side adjacent to the nearby conductor. The proximity effect is caused by eddy currents induced within a conductor by the time-varying magnetic field of the other conductor, by electromagnetic induction. For example, in a coil of wire carrying alternating current with multiple turns of wire lying next to each other, the current in each wire will be concentrated in a strip on each side of the wire facing away from the adjacent wires. This "current crowding" effect causes the current to occupy a smaller effective cross-sectional area of the conductor, increasing current density and AC electrical resistance of the conductor. The concentration of current on the side of the conductor gets larger with increasing frequency, so proximity effect causes adjacent wires carrying the same current to have more resistance at higher frequencies.

== Explanation ==
Diagram showing how proximity effect comes about in two parallel wires carrying alternating current (I, red arrows) in the same direction. The magnetic field (B, green lines) of one wire induces circular eddy currents (E) in the other wire. In the drawing the upper section of the righthand wire is removed to show the currents. The eddy current flows in the opposite direction to the main current on the adjacent side of the wire (1) reducing it, but flows in the same direction as the main current on the far side of the wire (2), increasing it. The distribution of current in the wire is illustrated by the arrows and color gradient shown on the cross section (3), with blue indicating areas of low current, and green, yellow, and red progressively higher current.

Diagram showing proximity effect in two wires carrying alternating current in opposite directions. In this case the magnetic field (B, green lines) passes through the righthand wire in the downward direction, so the eddy current (E) circles in a counterclockwise direction. The eddy current flows in the same direction as the main current on the adjacent side of the wire (1) increasing it, but in the opposite direction to the main current on the far side of the wire (2), decreasing it.

A changing magnetic field will influence the distribution of an electric current flowing within an electrical conductor, by electromagnetic induction. When an alternating current (AC) flows through a conductor, it creates an associated alternating magnetic field around it. The alternating magnetic field induces eddy currents in adjacent conductors, altering the overall distribution of current flowing through them. The result is that the current is concentrated in the areas of the conductor farthest away from nearby conductors carrying current in the same direction.

The proximity effect can significantly increase the AC resistance of adjacent conductors when compared to their resistance with a DC current. The effect increases with frequency. At higher frequencies, the AC resistance of a conductor can easily exceed ten times its DC resistance.

=== Example: two parallel wires ===
The cause of proximity effect can be seen from the accompanying drawings of two parallel wires next to each other carrying alternating current (AC). The righthand wire in each drawing has the top part transparent to show the currents inside the metal. Each drawing depicts a point in the alternating current cycle when the current is increasing.

==== Currents in the same direction ====
In the first drawing the current (I, red arrows) in both wires is in the same direction. The current in the lefthand wire creates a circular magnetic field (B, green lines) which passes through the other wire. From the right hand rule the field lines pass through the wire in an upward direction. From Faraday's law of induction, when the time-varying magnetic field is increasing, it creates a circular current (E, red loops) within the wire around the magnetic field lines in a clockwise direction. These are called eddy currents.

On the lefthand side nearest to the other wire (1) the eddy current is in the opposite direction to the main current (big pink arrow) in the wire, so it subtracts from the main current, reducing it. On the righthand side (2) the eddy current is in the same direction as the main current so it adds to it, increasing it. The net effect is to redistribute the current in the cross section of the wire into a thin strip on the side facing away from the other wire. The current distribution is shown by the red arrows and color gradient (3) on the cross section, with blue areas indicating low current and green, yellow, and red indicating higher current.

The same argument shows that the current in the lefthand wire is also concentrated into a strip on the far side away from the other wire.

In an alternating current the currents in the wire are increasing for half the time and decreasing half the time. When the current in the wires begins to decrease, the eddy currents reverse direction, which reverses the current redistribution.

==== Currents in opposite directions ====
In the second drawing, the alternating current in the wires is in opposite directions; in the lefthand wire it is into the page and in the righthand wire it is out of the page. This is the case in AC electrical power cables, which have two wires in which the current direction is always opposite. In this case, since the current is opposite, from the right hand rule the magnetic field (B) created by the lefthand wire is directed downward through the righthand wire, instead of upward as in the other drawing. From Faraday's law the circular eddy currents (E) are directed in a counterclockwise direction.

On the lefthand side nearest to the other wire (1) the eddy current is now in the same direction as the main current, so it adds to the main current, increasing it. On the righthand side (2) the eddy current is in the opposite direction to the main current, reducing it. In contrast to the previous case, the net effect is to redistribute the current into a thin strip on the side adjacent to the other wire.

== Effects ==
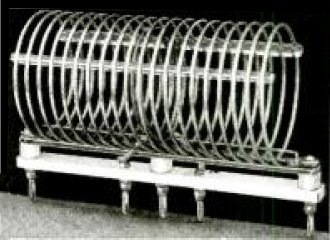
Inductor used at high frequencies in radio transmitters, showing construction to reduce resistance due to proximity effect. The coil is limited to a single layer, and the turns are spaced about two wire-diameters apart.

The additional resistance increases power losses which, in power circuits, can generate undesirable heating. Proximity and skin effect significantly complicate the design of efficient transformers and inductors operating at high frequencies, used for example in switched-mode power supplies.

In radio frequency tuned circuits used in radio equipment, proximity and skin effect losses in the inductor reduce the Q factor, broadening the bandwidth. To minimize this, special construction is used in radio frequency inductors. The winding is usually limited to a single layer, and often the turns are spaced apart to separate the conductors. In multilayer coils, the successive layers are wound in a crisscross pattern to avoid having wires lying parallel to one another; these are sometimes referred to as "basket-weave" or "honeycomb" coils. Since the current flows on the surface of the conductor, high frequency coils are sometimes silver-plated, or made of litz wire.

== Dowell method for determination of losses ==
This one-dimensional method for transformers assumes the wires have rectangular cross-section, but can be applied approximately to circular wire by treating it as square with the same cross-sectional area.

The windings are divided into 'portions', each portion being a group of layers which contains one position of zero MMF. For a transformer with a separate primary and secondary winding, each winding is a portion. For a transformer with interleaved (or sectionalised) windings, the innermost and outermost sections are each one portion, while the other sections are each divided into two portions at the point where zero m.m.f occurs.

The total resistance of a portion is given by
$$R_\text{AC} = R_\text{DC}\left(\operatorname{Re}(M) + \frac{(m^2-1) \operatorname{Re}(D)}{3}\right)$$

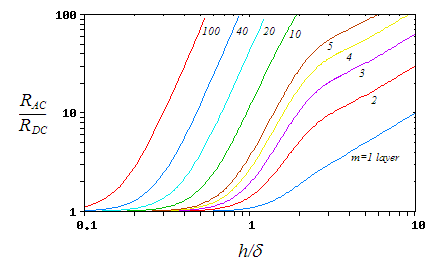
The ratio of AC to DC resistance for a portion of a strip winding at different frequencies (δ is Skin depth). It can be seen that increasing the number of layers dramatically increases the resistance at high frequencies.

- R_{DC} is the DC resistance of the portion
- Re(·) is the real part of the expression in brackets
- m number of layers in the portion, this should be an integer
- $M = \alpha h \coth (\alpha h)$
- $D = 2 \alpha h \tanh (\alpha h/2)$
- $\alpha = \sqrt{\frac{j \omega \mu_0 \eta}{\rho}}$
  - $\omega$ Angular frequency of the current
  - $\rho$ resistivity of the conductor material
  - $\eta = N_l \frac{a}{b}$
    - N_{l} number of turns per layer
    - a width of a square conductor
    - b width of the winding window
    - h height of a square conductor

== Squared-field-derivative method ==
This can be used for round wire or litz wire transformers or inductors with multiple windings of arbitrary geometry with arbitrary current waveforms in each winding. The diameter of each strand should be less than 2 δ. It also assumes the magnetic field is perpendicular to the axis of the wire, which is the case in most designs.

- Find values of the B field due to each winding individually. This can be done using a simple magnetostatic FEA model where each winding is represented as a region of constant current density, ignoring individual turns and litz strands.
- Produce a matrix, D, from these fields. D is a function of the geometry and is independent of the current waveforms.
  $$\mathbf{D}=\gamma_1 \left \langle
\begin{bmatrix}
\left | \hat{\vec B_1} \right |^2 & \hat{\vec B_1} \cdot \hat{\vec B_2} \\
\hat{\vec B_2} \cdot \hat{\vec B_1} & \left | \hat{\vec B_2} \right |^2
\end{bmatrix}
\right \rangle_1 + \gamma_2 \left \langle
\begin{bmatrix}
\left | \hat{\vec B_1} \right |^2 & \hat{\vec B_1} \cdot \hat{\vec B_2} \\
\hat{\vec B_2} \cdot \hat{\vec B_1} & \left | \hat{\vec B_2} \right |^2
\end{bmatrix}
\right \rangle_2$$
  - $\hat{\vec B_j}$ is the field due to a unit current in winding j
  - ⟨,⟩_{j} is the spatial average over the region of winding j
  - $\gamma_j = \frac{\pi N_j l_{t,j}d_{c,j}^4}{64 \rho_c}$
    - $N_j$ is the number of turns in winding j, for litz wire this is the product of the number of turns and the strands per turn.
    - $l_{t,j}$ is the average length of a turn
    - $d_{c,j}$ is the wire or strand diameter
    - $\rho_c$ is the resistivity of the wire
- AC power loss in all windings can be found using D, and expressions for the instantaneous current in each winding:
  $$P = \overline{\begin{bmatrix} \frac{di_1}{dt} & \frac{di_2}{dt}  \end{bmatrix}
\mathbf{D}
\begin{bmatrix} \frac{di_1}{dt} \\ \frac{di_2}{dt} \end{bmatrix}}$$
- Total winding power loss is then found by combining this value with the DC loss, $I_\text{rms}^2 \times R_\text{DC}$

The method can be generalized to multiple windings.

== See also ==
- Skin effect

== Reading ==
- Terman, F.E. Radio Engineers' Handbook, McGraw-Hill 1943—details electromagnetic proximity and skin effects
- Dowell, P. L. (August 1966). "Effects of eddy currents in transformer windings". Proceedings of the Institution of Electrical Engineers. 113 (8): 1387–1394. doi:10.1049/piee.1966.0236.
- Sullivan, Charles (2001). "Computationally Efficient Winding Loss Calculation with Multiple Windings, Arbitrary Waveforms, and Two-Dimensional or Three-Dimensional Field Geometry" (PDF). IEEE Transactions on Power Electronics. Vol. 16, no. 1. pp. 142–150. doi:10.1109/63.903999.
