= Tinsel wire =

Fatigue resistant low-current electrical wire

Tinsel wire is a type of electrical wire used for applications that require high mechanical flexibility but low current-carrying capacity. Tinsel wire is commonly used in cords of telephones, handsets, headphones, and small electrical appliances. It is far more resistant to metal fatigue failure than either stranded wire or solid wire.

== Construction ==
Tinsel wire is produced by wrapping several strands of thin metal foil around a flexible nylon or textile core. Because the foil is very thin, the bend radius imposed on the foil is much greater than the thickness of the foil, leading to a low probability of metal fatigue. Meanwhile, the core provides high tensile strength without impairing flexibility.

Typically, multiple tinsel wires are jacketed with an insulating layer to form one conductor. A cord is formed from several conductors in either a round profile or a flat cable.

== Connections ==
Tinsel wire is commonly connected to equipment with crimped terminal lugs that pierce the insulation to make contact with the metal ribbons, rather than stripping insulation. Separated from the core, the individual ribbons are relatively fragile, and the core can be damaged by high temperatures. These factors make it difficult or impractical to terminate tinsel wire by soldering during equipment manufacture, although soldering is possible, with some difficulty, to repair a failed connection. However, the conductors tend to break at their junction with the rigid solder.

== Applications ==
Tinsel wires or cords are used for telephony and audio applications in which frequent bending of electric cords occurs, such as for headsets and telephone handsets. It is also used in power cords for small appliances such as electric shavers or clocks, where stranded cable conductors of adequate mechanical size would be too stiff. Tinsel cords are recognized as type TPT or TST in the US and Canadian electrical codes, and are rated at 0.5 amperes.

== Manufacturers and suppliers ==
- Maeden
- Dacon Systems, Inc.
- Gavitt Wire & Cable Co., Inc.

== See also ==
- Litz wire – High frequency optimised electric wire
