= Mattis–Bardeen theory =

Theory of electric and optical response of superconductors

The Mattis–Bardeen theory is a theory that describes the electrodynamic properties of superconductivity. It is commonly applied in the research field of optical spectroscopy on superconductors. It is named after Daniel C. Mattis and John Bardeen who developed it in 1958.

It was derived to explain the anomalous skin effect of superconductors. Originally, the anomalous skin effect indicates the non-classical response of metals to high frequency electromagnetic field in low temperature, which was solved by Robert G. Chambers in 1950. At sufficiently low temperatures and high frequencies, the classically predicted skin depth (normal skin effect) fails because of the enhancement of the mean free path of the electrons in a good metal. Not only the normal metals, but superconductors also show the anomalous skin effect which has to be considered with the theory of Bardeen, Cooper and Schrieffer (BCS).

== Response to an electromagnetic wave ==
BCS theory is based on the pairing of two electrons (Cooper pair). After the transition to the superconducting state, the superconducting gap 2Δ in the single-particle density of states arises, and the dispersion relation can be described like the one of a semiconductor with band gap 2Δ around the Fermi energy. From the Fermi golden rule, the transition probabilities can be written as

$$\alpha_s = \int {\left| M_s \right|^2 N_s (E)N_s (E + \hbar \omega ) \times [f(E) - f(E + \hbar \omega )]{\rm{ }}} dE$$

where $N_s$ is the density of states. And $M_s$ is the matrix element of an interaction Hamiltonian $H_1$ where

$$H_1 = \sum\limits_{k\sigma ,k'\sigma '} {B_{k'\sigma ',k\sigma } c_{k'\sigma '}^* } c_{k'\sigma '}$$

In the superconducting state, each term of the Hamiltonian is dependent, because of the superconducting state consists of a phase-coherent superposition of occupied one-electron states, whereas it is independent in the normal state. Therefore, there appear interference terms in the absolute square of the matrix element. The result of the coherence changes the matrix element $M_s$ into the matrix element $M$ of single electron and the coherence factors F(Δ,E,E').

$$F(\Delta ,E,E') = \frac{1}{2}\left(1 \pm \frac{{\Delta ^2 }}{{EE'}}\right)$$

Then, the transition rate is

$$\alpha _s = \int {\left| M \right|^2 F(\Delta ,E,E + \hbar \omega )N_s (E)N_s (E + \hbar \omega ) \times [f(E) - f(E + \hbar \omega )]{\rm{ }}} dE$$

where the transition rate can be translated to real part of the complex conductivity, $\sigma_1$, because the electrodynamic energy absorption is proportional to the $\sigma _1 E^2$.

$$\frac{{\alpha _s }}{{\alpha _n }} = \frac{{\sigma _{1s} }}{{\sigma _n }}$$

In finite temperature condition, the response of electrons due to the incident electromagnetic wave can be regarded as two parts, the “superconducting” and “normal” electrons. The first one corresponds to the superconducting ground state and the next to the thermally excited electrons from the ground state. This picture is the so-called "two-fluid" model. If we consider the “normal” electrons, the ratio of the optical conductivity to that of the normal state is

$$\frac{{\alpha _s }}
{{\alpha _n }} = \frac{2}
{{\hbar \omega }}\int_\Delta ^\infty {\frac{{\left[ {{E(E + }\hbar \omega {\text{)}} + \Delta ^2 } \right][f(E) - f(E + \hbar \omega )]}}
{{(E^2 - \Delta ^2 )^{1/2} [(E + \hbar \omega )^2 - \Delta ^2 ]^{1/2} }}dE} {-}\Theta(\hbar \omega-2\Delta)\frac{1}
{{\hbar \omega }}\int_{\Delta - \hbar \omega }^{ - \Delta } {\frac{{\left[ {{E(E + }\hbar \omega {\text{)}} + \Delta ^2 } \right][1 - 2f(E + \hbar \omega )]}}
{{(E^2 - \Delta ^2 )^{1/2} [(E + \hbar \omega )^2 - \Delta ^2 ]^{1/2} }}dE}$$

where $\Theta(x)$ is the Heaviside theta function. The first term of the upper equation is the contribution of "normal" electrons, and the second term is due to the superconducting electrons.

== Use in optical study ==
The calculated optical conductivity breaks the sum rule that the spectral weight should be conserved through the transition. This result implies that the missing area of the spectral weight is concentrated in the zero frequency limit, corresponding to the dirac delta function (which covers the conduction of the superconducting condensate, i.e. the Cooper pairs). Many experimental data supports the prediction. This story on electrodynamics of superconductivity is the starting point of optical study. Because any superconducting T_{c} never exceeds 200K and the superconducting gap value is about the 3.5 k_{B}T, microwave or far-infrared spectroscopy is suitable technique applying this theory. With the Mattis–Bardeen theory, we can derive fruitful properties of the superconducting gap, like gap symmetry.
