= Current crowding =

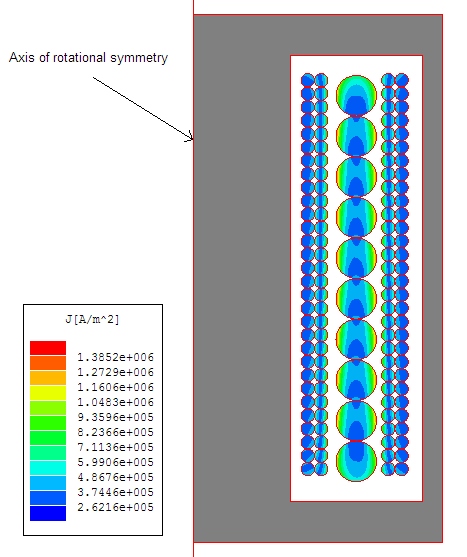
Current density in transformer windings.

Current crowding (also current crowding effect, or CCE) is a nonuniform distribution of current density through a conductor or semiconductor, especially in the vicinity of electrical contacts and over p–n junctions.

Current crowding is one of the factors limiting the efficiency of light-emitting diodes. Materials with low mobility of charge carriers (e.g., aluminium gallium indium phosphide (AlGaInP)) are especially prone to current crowding phenomena. It is the dominant loss mechanism in some LEDs, where the current densities, especially around the P-side contacts, reach an area of the emission characteristics with lower brightness/current efficiency.

Current crowding can lead to localized overheating and formation of thermal hotspots, in catastrophic cases leading to thermal runaway. Nonhomogenous distribution of current also aggravates electromigration effects and the formation of voids (see, e.g., the Kirkendall effect). Formation of voids causes localized nonhomogeneity of current density, and the increased resistance around the void causes further localized temperature rise, which in turn accelerates the formation of the void. Conversely, localized lowering of current density may lead to deposition of the migrated atoms, leading to further lowering of current density, further deposition of material, and formation of hillocks, which may cause short circuits.

In large bipolar junction transistors, the resistance of the base layer influences the distribution of current density through the base region, especially at the emitter side.

Current crowding occurs especially in areas of localized lowered resistance, or in areas where the field strength is concentrated (e.g., at the edges of layers).

== See also ==
- Proximity effect (electromagnetism)
- Skin effect
