= Wheeler incremental inductance rule =

Rule of thumb for estimating skin effect resistance of parallel transmission lines

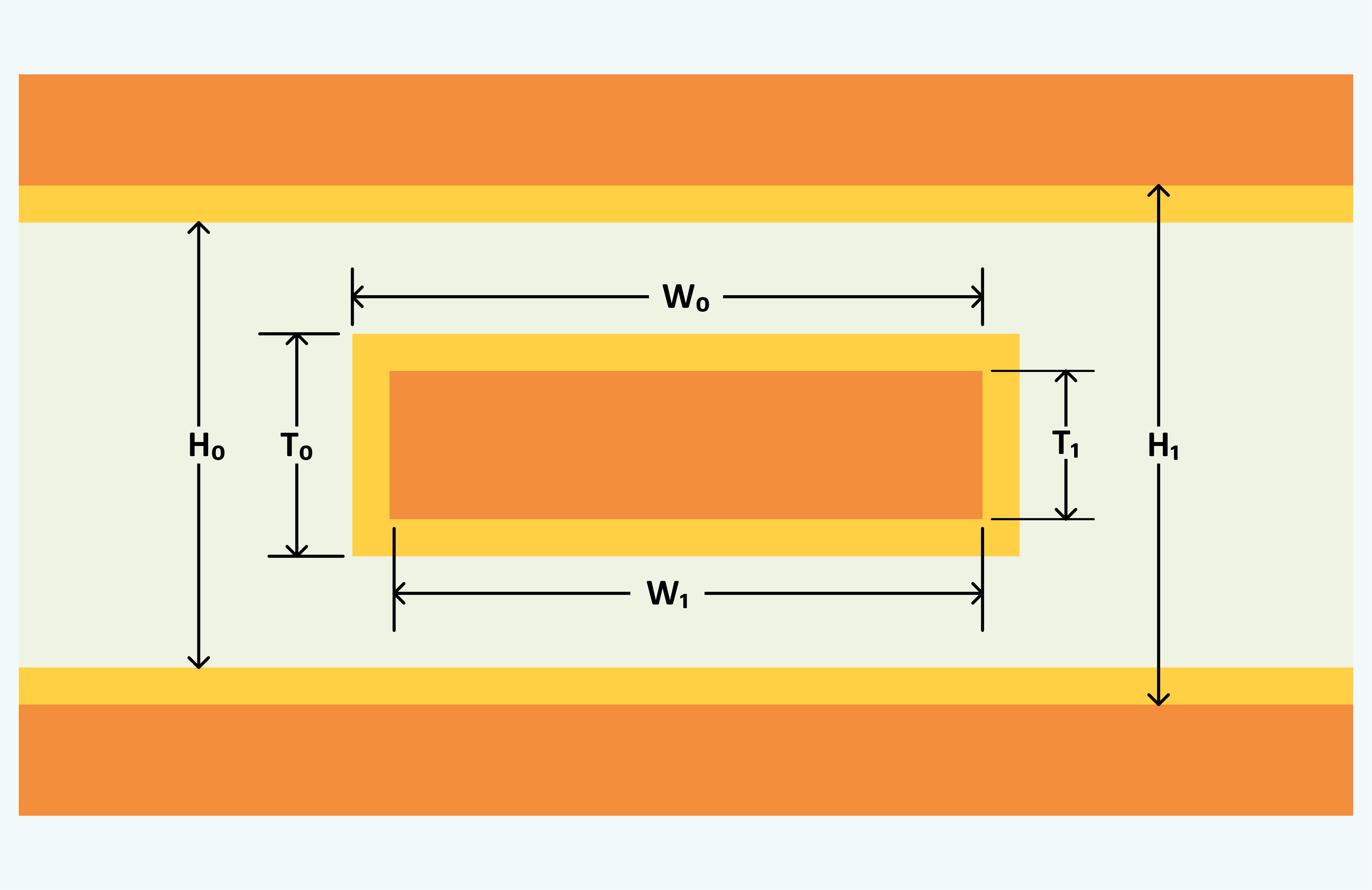
Stripline illustrating the incremental Wheeler inductance rule.

The incremental inductance rule, attributed to Harold Alden Wheeler by Gupta and others is a formula used to compute skin effect resistance and internal inductance in parallel transmission lines when the frequency is high enough that the skin effect is fully developed. Wheeler's concept is that the internal inductance of a conductor is the difference between the computed external inductance and the external inductance computed with all the conductive surfaces receded by one half of the skin depth.

L_{internal} = L_{external}(conductors receded) − L_{external}(conductors not receded).

Skin effect resistance is assumed to be equal to the reactance of the internal inductance.

R_{skin} = ωL_{internal}.

Gupta gives a general equation with partial derivatives replacing the difference of inductance.

$$L_\mathrm{int}= \sum_{m} \ \frac {\mu_m} {\mu_0} \frac {\partial L} {\partial n_m} \frac {\delta_m} {2}$$

$$R_\mathrm{skin} = \sum_{m} \ \frac {R_{\mathrm{s} m}} {\mu_0} \frac {\partial L} {\partial n_m} = \omega L_\mathrm{int}$$

where

$\frac {\partial L} {\partial n_m}$ is taken to mean the differential change in inductance as surface m is receded in the n_{m} direction.
$R_{\mathrm{s} m} = \frac {\omega \mu_m \delta_m} {2}$ is the surface resistivity of surface m.
$\mu_m =$ magnetic permeability of conductive material at surface m.
$\delta_m =$ skin depth of conductive material at surface m.
$n_m =$ unit normal vector at surface m.

Wadell and Gupta state that the thickness and corner radius of the conductors should be large with respect to the skin depth. Garg further states that the thickness of the conductors must be at least four times the skin depth. Garg states that the calculation is unchanged if the dielectric is taken to be air and that $L = Z_{\mathrm{c}} / V_{\mathrm{p}}$ where $Z_{\mathrm{c}}$ is the characteristic impedance and $V_{\mathrm{p}}$ the velocity of propagation. Paul, 2007, (Note: Wheeler incremental inductance rule … should not be used for conductors of rectangular cross-section, because, … resistance and internal inductance reactance are not equal.) disputes the accuracy of $R_{\mathrm{skin}} = \omega L_{\mathrm{int}}$ at very high frequencies for rectangular conductors such as stripline and microstrip due to a non-uniform distribution of current on the conductor. At very high frequency, the current crowds into the corners of the conductor.

== Example ==
In the top figure, if

$L_0$ is the inductance and $Z_0$ is the characteristic impedance using the dimensions $\mathrm{H}_0, \mathrm{W}_0$, and $\mathrm{T}_0$,

and

$L_1$ is the inductance and $Z_1$ is the characteristic impedance using the dimensions $\mathrm{H}_1, \mathrm{W}_1$, and $\mathrm{T}_1$

then the internal inductance is

$L_\mathrm{internal} = ( L_1 - L_0 ) = ( Z_1 - Z_0 ) / V_{\mathrm{p}}$ where $V_{\mathrm{p}}$ is the velocity of propagation in the dielectric.

and the skin effect resistance is

$$R_{\mathrm{skin}} = \omega ( L_1 - L_0 )$$
