= Skin effect =

Tendency of AC current flow in a conductor's outer layer

Distribution of current flow in a cylindrical conductor, shown in cross section. For alternating current, current density decreases exponentially from the surface towards the inside. Skin depth, δ, is defined as the depth where the current density is just 1/e (about 37%) of the value at the surface; it depends on the frequency of the current and the electrical and magnetic properties of the conductor.

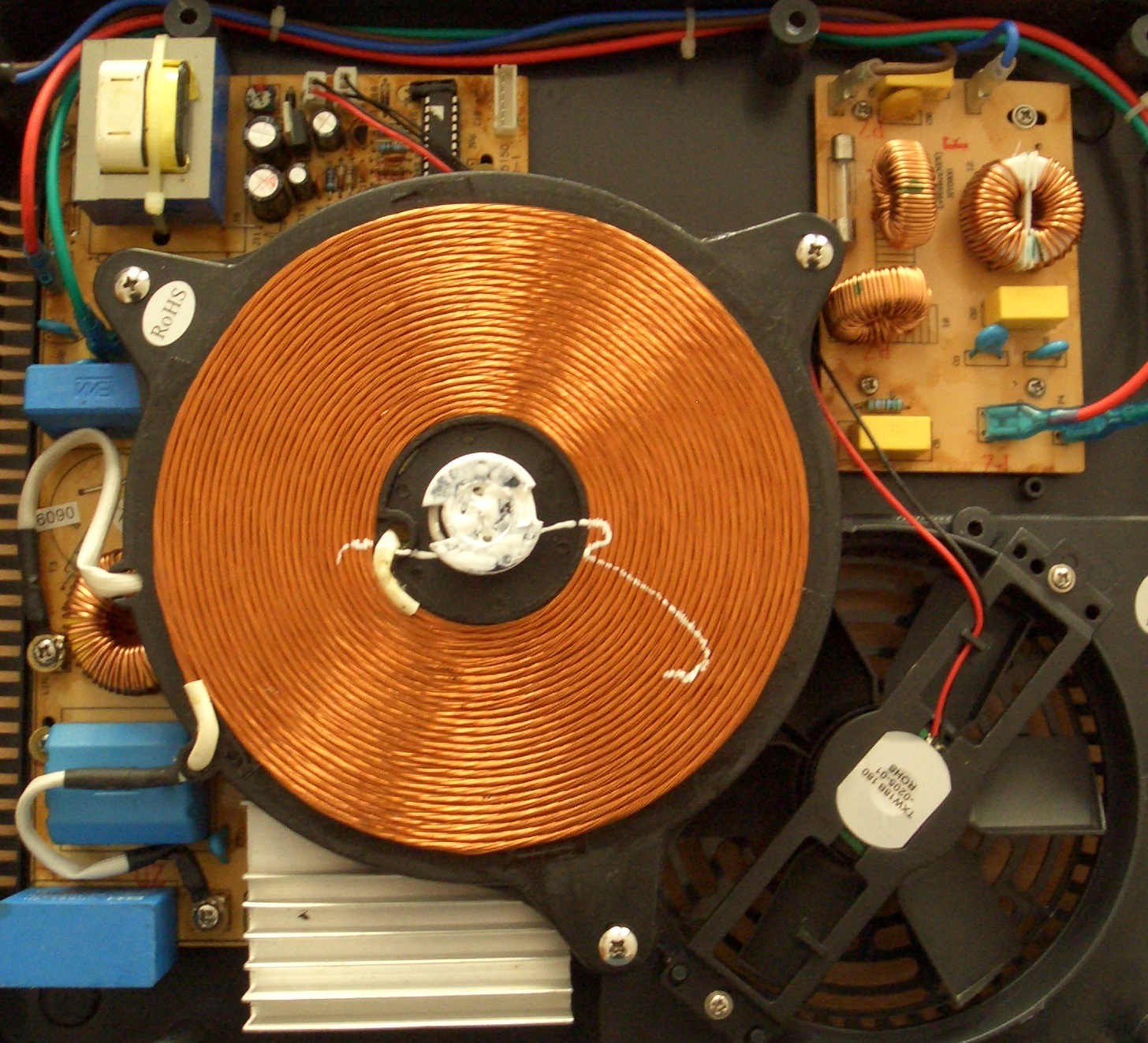
Induction cookers use stranded coils (Litz wire) to reduce heating of the coil itself due to skin effect. The AC frequencies used in induction cookers are much higher than standard mains frequency ‒ typically around 25–50 kHz.

In electromagnetism, skin effect is the tendency of an alternating electric current (AC) to become distributed within a conductor such that the current density is largest near the surface of the conductor and decreases exponentially with greater depths in the conductor. It is caused by opposing eddy currents induced by the changing magnetic field resulting from the alternating current. The electric current flows mainly at the skin of the conductor, between the outer surface and a level called the skin depth.

Skin depth depends on the frequency of the alternating current; as frequency increases, current flow becomes more concentrated near the surface, resulting in less skin depth. Skin effect reduces the effective cross-section of the conductor and thus increases its effective resistance. At 60 Hz in copper, skin depth is about 8.5 mm. At high frequencies, skin depth becomes much smaller.

Increased AC resistance caused by skin effect can be mitigated by using a specialized multistrand wire called litz wire. Because the interior of a large conductor carries little of the current, tubular conductors can be used to save weight and cost.

Skin effect has practical consequences in the analysis and design of radio-frequency and microwave circuits, transmission lines (or waveguides), and antennas. It is also important at mains frequencies (50–60 Hz) in AC electric power transmission and distribution systems. It is one of the reasons for preferring high-voltage direct current for long-distance power transmission.

The effect was first described in a paper by Horace Lamb in 1883 for the case of spherical conductors, and was generalized to conductors of any shape by Oliver Heaviside in 1885.

== Cause ==
Cause of skin effect. A main current I flowing through a conductor induces a magnetic field H. If the current increases, as in this figure, the resulting increase in H induces separate, circulating eddy currents I_{W} which partially cancel the current flow in the center and reinforce it near the skin.

Conductors, typically in the form of wires, may be used to transfer electrical energy or signals using an alternating current flowing through that conductor. The charge carriers constituting that current, usually electrons, are driven by an electric field due to the source of electrical energy. A current in a conductor produces a magnetic field in and around the conductor. When the intensity of current in a conductor changes, the magnetic field also changes. The change in the magnetic field, in turn, creates an electric field that opposes the change in current intensity. This opposing electric field is called counter-electromotive force (back EMF). The back EMF is strongest / most concentrated at the center of the conductor, allowing current only near the outside skin of the conductor, as shown in the diagram on the right.

Regardless of the driving force, the current density is found to be greatest at the conductor's surface, with a reduced magnitude deeper in the conductor. That decline in current density is known as the skin effect and the skin depth is a measure of the depth at which the current density falls to 1/e of its value near the surface. Over 98% of the current will flow within a layer 4 times the skin depth from the surface. This behavior is distinct from that of direct current which usually will be distributed evenly over the cross-section of the wire.

An alternating current may also be induced in a conductor due to an alternating magnetic field according to the law of induction. An electromagnetic wave impinging on a conductor will therefore generally produce such a current; this explains the attenuation of electromagnetic waves in metals. Although the term skin effect is most often associated with applications involving transmission of electric currents, skin depth also describes the exponential decay of the electric and magnetic fields, as well as the density of induced currents, inside a bulk material when a plane wave impinges on it at normal incidence.

== Formula ==
The AC current density J in a conductor decreases exponentially from its value at the surface J_{S} according to the depth d from the surface, as follows:
$$J = J_\mathrm{S} \,e^{-{(1+j)d/\delta }}$$
where $\delta$ is called the skin depth which is defined as the depth below the surface of the conductor at which the current density has fallen to 1/e (about 0.37) of J_{S}. The imaginary part of the exponent indicates that the phase of the current density is delayed 1 radian for each skin depth of penetration. One full wavelength in the conductor requires 2π skin depths, at which point the current density is attenuated to e^{−2π} (1.87×10^{−3}, or −54.6 dB) of its surface value. The wavelength in the conductor is much shorter than the wavelength in vacuum, or equivalently, the phase velocity in a conductor is very much slower than the speed of light in vacuum. For example, a 1 MHz radio wave has a wavelength in vacuum λ_{o} of about 300 m, whereas in copper, the wavelength is reduced to only about 0.5 mm with a phase velocity of only about 500 m/s. As a consequence of Snell's law and this very tiny phase velocity in a conductor, any wave entering a conductor, even at grazing incidence, refracts essentially in the direction perpendicular to the conductor's surface.

The general formula for skin depth when there is no dielectric or magnetic loss is:
$$\delta= \sqrt{ \frac{\, 2\rho \,}{\omega\mu }
\left (\sqrt{1 + \left({\rho\omega\varepsilon}\right)^2 \,}
+ \rho\omega\varepsilon \right) \,}$$

where

- $\rho =$ resistivity of the conductor
- $\omega =$ angular frequency of current $= 2\pi f,$ where $f$ is the frequency.
- $\mu =$ permeability of the conductor, $\mu_r \, \mu_0$
- $\mu_r =$ relative magnetic permeability of the conductor
- $\mu_0 =$ the permeability of free space
- $\varepsilon =$ permittivity of the conductor, $\varepsilon_r \, \varepsilon_0$
- $\varepsilon_r =$ relative permittivity of the conductor
- $\varepsilon_0 =$ the permittivity of free space.

At frequencies much below $1/(\rho \varepsilon)$ the quantity inside the large parentheses is close to unity and the formula is more usually given as:
$$\delta=\sqrt{\frac{\, 2\rho \,}{\omega\mu} \,} ~.$$

This formula is valid at frequencies away from strong atomic or molecular resonances (where $\varepsilon$ would have a large imaginary part) and at frequencies that are much below both the material's plasma frequency (dependent on the density of free electrons in the material) and the reciprocal of the mean time between collisions involving the conduction electrons. In good conductors such as metals all of those conditions are ensured at least up to microwave frequencies, justifying this formula's validity. (Note: Note that the above equation for the current density inside the conductor as a function of depth applies to cases where the usual approximation for skin depth holds. In the extreme cases where it doesn't, the exponential decrease with respect to skin depth still applies to the magnitude of the induced currents, however the imaginary part of the exponent in that equation, and thus the phase velocity inside the material, are altered with respect to that equation.) For example, in the case of copper, this would be true for frequencies much below 10^{18} Hz.

However, in very poor conductors, at sufficiently high frequencies, the quantity inside the large parentheses increases. At frequencies much higher than $1/(\rho \varepsilon)$, skin depth approaches the asymptotic value:
$$\delta \approx  {2 \rho} \sqrt{\frac{\, \varepsilon \,}{ \mu }\,} ~.$$

This departure from the usual formula only applies for materials of rather low conductivity and at frequencies where the vacuum wavelength is not much larger than the skin depth itself. For instance, bulk silicon (undoped) is a poor conductor and has a skin depth of about 40 meters at 100 kHz (λ = 3 km). However, as the frequency is increased well into the megahertz range, its skin depth never falls below the asymptotic value of 11 meters. The conclusion is that in poor solid conductors, such as undoped silicon, skin effect does not need to be taken into account in most practical situations.

== Round wire ==
When skin depth is not small with respect to the radius of the wire, current density may be described in terms of Bessel functions. The current density inside round wire away from the influences of other fields, as function of distance from the axis is given by:

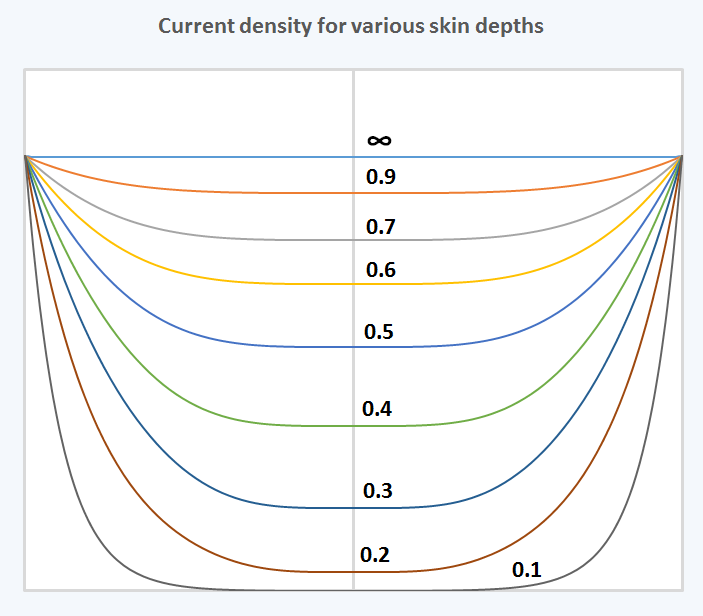
Current density in round wire for various skin depths. Numbers shown on each curve are the ratio of skin depth to wire radius. The curve shown with the infinity sign is the zero frequency (DC) case. All curves are normalized so that the current density at the surface is the same. The horizontal axis is the position within the wire with the left and right extremes being the surface of the wire. The vertical axis is relative current density.

$$\mathbf{J}(r) = \frac{ k \mathbf{I} }{ 2 \pi R } \frac{ J_0(k r) }{ J_1(k R) } = \mathbf{J}(R) \frac{ J_0(k r) }{ J_0(k R) }$$

where

- $r = {}$distance from the axis of the wire
- $R = {}$radius of the wire
- $\mathbf{J}(r) = {}$current density phasor at distance, r, from the axis of the wire
- $\mathbf{J}(R) = {}$current density phasor at the surface of the wire
- $\mathbf{I} =$ total current phasor
- $J_0 = {}$Bessel function of the first kind, order 0
- $J_1 = {}$Bessel function of the first kind, order 1
- $k = \sqrt{ \frac { -j \omega \mu } { \rho } } = \frac { 1-j } { \delta }$ the wave number in the conductor
- $\delta = \sqrt{ \frac { 2 \rho } { \omega \mu } }$ also called skin depth.
- $\rho = {}$resistivity of the conductor
- $\mu_r = {}$relative magnetic permeability of the conductor
- $\mu = \mu_r \mu_0$

Since $k$ is complex, the Bessel functions are also complex. The amplitude and phase of the current density varies with depth.

=== Derivation ===
Combining the electromagnetic wave equation and Ohm's law produces
$$\nabla^2\mathbf{J}(r) + k^2\mathbf{J}(r) = \frac{\partial^2}{\partial r^2}\mathbf{J}(r) + \frac{1}{r}\frac{\partial}{\partial r}\mathbf{J}(r) + k^2\mathbf{J}(r) = 0.$$
The solution to this equation is, for finite current in the center of the conductor,
$$\mathbf{J}(r) = \mathbf{C}J_0(kr),$$
where $J_0$ is a Bessel function of the first kind of order $0$ and $\mathbf{C}$ is a constant phasor. To satisfy the boundary condition for the current density at the surface of the conductor, $\mathbf{J}(R),$ $\mathbf{C}$ must be $\frac{\mathbf{J}(R)}{J_0(kR)}.$ Thus,
$$\mathbf{J}(r) = \mathbf{J}(R)\frac{J_0(kr)}{J_0(kR)} .$$

=== Impedance ===
==== Resistance ====
The most important effect of skin effect on the impedance of a single wire is the increase of the wire's resistance, and consequent losses. The effective resistance due to a current confined near the surface of a large conductor (much thicker than δ) can be solved as if the current flowed uniformly through a layer of thickness δ based on the DC resistivity of that material. The effective cross-sectional area is approximately equal to δ times the conductor's circumference. Thus a long cylindrical conductor such as a wire, having a diameter D large compared to δ, has a resistance approximately that of a hollow tube with wall thickness δ carrying direct current. The AC resistance of a wire of length ℓ and resistivity $\rho$ is:
$$R\approx
{{\ell \rho} \over {\pi (D-\delta) \delta}}
\approx
{{\ell \rho} \over {\pi D \delta}}$$

The final approximation above assumes $D \gg \delta$.

A convenient formula (attributed to F.E. Terman) for the diameter D_{W} of a wire of circular cross-section whose resistance will increase by 10% at frequency f is:
$$D_\mathrm{W} = {\frac{200~\mathrm{mm}}{\sqrt{f/\mathrm{Hz}}}}$$

This formula for the increase in AC resistance is accurate only for an isolated wire. For nearby wires, e.g. in a cable or a coil, the AC resistance is also affected by proximity effect, which can cause an additional increase in the AC resistance. The internal impedance per unit length of a segment of round wire is given by:
$$\mathbf{Z}_\text{int} =   \frac { k \rho } { 2 \pi R }      \frac {  J_0(k R) } { J_1(k R) }.$$

This impedance is a complex quantity corresponding to a resistance (real) in series with the reactance (imaginary) due to the wire's internal self-inductance, per unit length.

==== Inductance ====
The portion of a wire's inductance that can be attributed to the magnetic field inside the wire itself is called the internal inductance, which accounts for the inductive reactance (imaginary part of the impedance) given by the above formula. In most cases this is a small portion of a wire's inductance which includes the effect of induction from magnetic fields outside of the wire produced by the current in the wire. Unlike that external inductance, the internal inductance is reduced by skin effect, that is, at frequencies where skin depth is no longer large compared to the conductor's size. This small component of inductance approaches a value of $\frac \mu { 8 \pi }$ (50 nH/m for non-magnetic wire) at low frequencies, regardless of the wire's radius. Its reduction with increasing frequency, as the ratio of skin depth to the wire's radius falls below about 1, is plotted in the accompanying graph, and accounts for the reduction in the telephone cable inductance with increasing frequency in the table below.

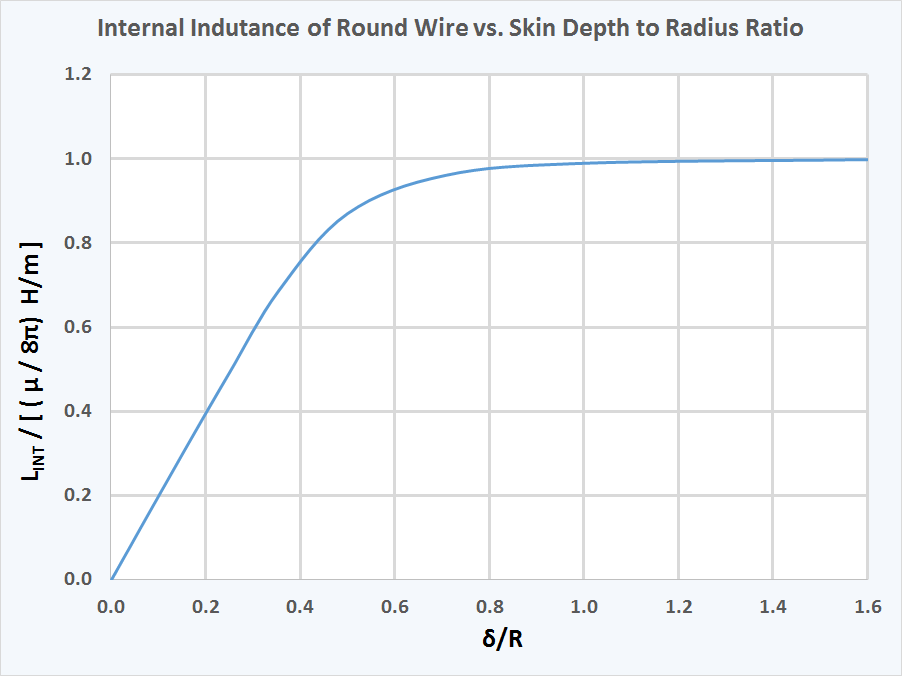
The internal component of a round wire's inductance vs. the ratio of skin depth to radius. That component of the self inductance is reduced below μ/8π as skin depth becomes small (as frequency increases).

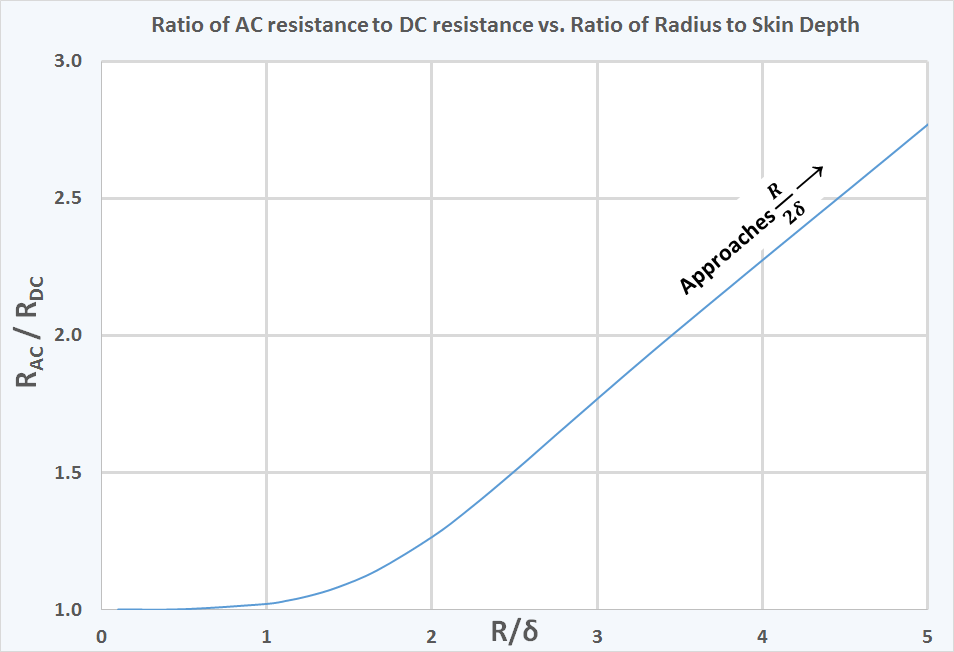
The ratio AC resistance to DC resistance of a round wire versus the ratio of the wire's radius to the skin depth. As skin depth becomes small relative to the radius, the ratio of AC to DC resistance approaches one half of the ratio of the radius to the skin depth.

Refer to the diagram below showing the inner and outer conductors of a coaxial cable. Since skin effect causes a current at high frequencies to flow mainly at the surface of a conductor, it can be seen that this will reduce the magnetic field inside the wire, that is, beneath the depth at which the bulk of the current flows. It can be shown that this will have a minor effect on the self-inductance of the wire itself; see Skilling or Hayt for a mathematical treatment of this phenomenon.

The inductance considered in this context refers to a bare conductor, not the inductance of a coil used as a circuit element. The inductance of a coil is dominated by the mutual inductance between the turns of the coil which increases its inductance according to the square of the number of turns. However, when only a single wire is involved, then in addition to the external inductance involving magnetic fields outside the wire (due to the total current in the wire) as seen in the white region of the figure below, there is also a much smaller component of internal inductance due to the portion of the magnetic field inside the wire itself, the green region in figure B. That small component of the inductance is reduced when the current is concentrated toward the skin of the conductor, that is, when skin depth is not much larger than the wire's radius, as will become the case at higher frequencies.

For a single wire, this reduction becomes of diminishing significance as the wire becomes longer in comparison to its diameter, and is usually neglected. However, the presence of a second conductor in the case of a transmission line reduces the extent of the external magnetic field (and of the total self-inductance) regardless of the wire's length, so that the inductance decrease due to skin effect can still be important. For instance, in the case of a telephone twisted pair, below, the inductance of the conductors substantially decreases at higher frequencies where skin effect becomes important. On the other hand, when the external component of the inductance is magnified due to the geometry of a coil (due to the mutual inductance between the turns), the significance of the internal inductance component is even further dwarfed and is ignored.

===== Coaxial cable =====
Let the dimensions a, b, and c be the inner conductor radius, the shield (outer conductor) inside radius and the shield outer radius respectively, as seen in the crossection of figure A below.

Four stages of skin effect in a coax showing the effect on inductance. Diagrams show a cross-section of the coaxial cable. Color code: black - overall insulating sheath tan - conductor white - dielectric green - current into the diagram teal - current coming out of the diagram Dashed black lines with arrowheads are magnetic flux (B). The width of the dashed black lines is intended to show relative strength of the magnetic field integrated over the circumference at that radius. The four stages are: A non-energized; B low frequency; C middle frequency; D high frequency; There are three regions that may contain induced magnetic fields: the center conductor, the dielectric and the outer conductor. In stage B, current covers the conductors uniformly and there is a significant magnetic field in all three regions. As the frequency is increased and the skin effect takes hold (C and D) the magnetic field in the dielectric region is unchanged as it is proportional to the total current flowing in the center conductor. In C, however, there is a reduced magnetic field in the deeper sections of the inner conductor and the outer sections of the shield (outer conductor). Thus there is less energy stored in the magnetic field given the same total current, corresponding to a reduced inductance. At an even higher frequency, D, the skin depth is tiny: All current is confined to the surface of the conductors. The only magnetic field is in the regions between the conductors; only the external inductance remains.

For a given current, the total energy stored in the magnetic fields must be the same as the calculated electrical energy attributed to that current flowing through the inductance of the coax; that energy is proportional to the cable's measured inductance.

The magnetic field inside a coaxial cable can be divided into three regions, each of which will therefore contribute to the electrical inductance seen by a length of cable.

- The inductance $L_\text{cen} \,$ is associated with the magnetic field in the region with radius $r < a \,$, the region inside the center conductor.
- The inductance $L_\text{ext} \,$ is associated with the magnetic field in the region $a < r < b \,$, the region between the two conductors (containing a dielectric, possibly air).
- The inductance $L_\text{shd} \,$ is associated with the magnetic field in the region $b < r < c \,$, the region inside the shield conductor.

The net electrical inductance is due to all three contributions:
$$L_\text{total} = L_\text{cen} + L_\text{shd} + L_\text{ext}\,$$

$L_\text{ext} \,$ is not changed by the skin effect and is given by the frequently cited formula for inductance L per length D of a coaxial cable:
$$L/D = \frac{\mu_0}{2 \pi} \ln  \left( \frac {b}{a}  \right)   \,$$

At low frequencies, all three inductances are fully present so that $L_\text{DC} = L_\text{cen} + L_\text{shd} + L_\text{ext}\,$.

At high frequencies, only the dielectric region has magnetic flux, so that $L_\infty = L_\text{ext}\,$.

Most discussions of coaxial transmission lines assume they will be used for radio frequencies, so equations are supplied corresponding only to the latter case.

As skin effect increases, the currents are concentrated near the outside the inner conductor (r = a) and the inside of the shield (r = b). Since there is essentially no current deeper in the inner conductor, there is no magnetic field beneath the surface of the inner conductor. Since the current in the inner conductor is balanced by the opposite current flowing on the inside of the outer conductor, there is no remaining magnetic field in the outer conductor itself where $b < r < c \,$. Only $L_\text{ext}$ contributes to the electrical inductance at these higher frequencies.

Although the geometry is different, a twisted pair used in telephone lines is similarly affected: at higher frequencies, the inductance decreases by more than 20% as can be seen in the following table.

===== Telephone cable =====
Representative parameter data for 24 gauge PIC telephone cable at 21 °C (70 °F).

Frequency (Hz)	R (Ω/km)	L (mH/km)	G (μS/km)	C (nF/km)
1 Hz	172.24	0.6129	0.000	51.57
1 kHz	172.28	0.6125	0.072	51.57
10 kHz	172.70	0.6099	0.531	51.57
100 kHz	191.63	0.5807	3.327	51.57
1 MHz	463.59	0.5062	29.111	51.57
2 MHz	643.14	0.4862	53.205	51.57
5 MHz	999.41	0.4675	118.074	51.57

More extensive tables and tables for other gauges, temperatures and types are available in Reeve. Chen gives the same data in a parameterized form that he states is usable up to 50 MHz.

Chen gives an equation of this form for telephone twisted pair:
$$L(f) = \frac {\ell_0 + \ell_\infty \left(\frac{f}{f_m}\right)^b }{1 + \left(\frac{f}{f_m}\right)^b} \,$$

== Material effect on skin depth ==
In a good conductor, skin depth is proportional to square root of the resistivity. This means that better conductors have a reduced skin depth. The overall resistance of the better conductor remains lower even with the reduced skin depth. However the better conductor will show a higher ratio between its AC and DC resistance, when compared with a conductor of higher resistivity. For example, at 60 Hz, a 2000 MCM (1000 square millimeter) copper conductor has 23% more resistance than it does at DC. The same size conductor in aluminum has only 10% more resistance with 60 Hz AC than it does with DC.

Skin depth also varies as the inverse square root of the permeability of the conductor. In the case of iron, its conductivity is about 1/7 that of copper. However being ferromagnetic its permeability is about 10,000 times greater. This reduces the skin depth for iron to about 1/38 that of copper, about 220 micrometers at 60 Hz. Iron wire is impractical for AC power lines (except to add mechanical strength by serving as a core to a non-ferromagnetic conductor like aluminum). Skin effect also reduces the effective thickness of laminations in power transformers, increasing their losses.

Iron rods work well for direct-current (DC) welding but it is difficult to use them at frequencies much higher than 60 Hz. At a few kilohertz, an iron welding rod would glow red hot as current flows through the greatly increased AC resistance resulting from skin effect, with relatively little power remaining for the arc itself. Only non-magnetic rods are used for high-frequency welding.

At 1 megahertz skin effect depth in wet soil is about 5.0 m; in seawater it is about 0.25 m.

== Mitigation ==
A type of cable called litz wire (from the German Litzendraht, braided wire) is used to mitigate skin effect for frequencies of a few kilohertz to about one megahertz. It consists of a number of insulated wire strands woven together in a carefully designed pattern, so that the overall magnetic field acts equally on all the wires and causes the total current to be distributed equally among them. With skin effect having little effect on each of the thin strands, the bundle does not suffer the same increase in AC resistance that a solid conductor of the same cross-sectional area would due to skin effect.

Litz wire is often used in the windings of high-frequency transformers to increase their efficiency by mitigating both skin effect and proximity effect. Large power transformers are wound with stranded conductors of similar construction to litz wire, but employing a larger cross-section corresponding to the larger skin depth at mains frequencies. Conductive threads composed of carbon nanotubes have been demonstrated as conductors for antennas from medium wave to microwave frequencies. Unlike standard antenna conductors, the nanotubes are much smaller than the skin depth, allowing full use of the thread's cross-section resulting in an extremely light antenna.

High-voltage, high-current overhead power lines often use aluminum cable with a steel reinforcing core; the higher resistance of the steel core is of no consequence since it is located far below the skin depth where essentially no AC current flows.

In applications where high currents (up to thousands of amperes) flow, solid conductors are usually replaced by tubes, eliminating the inner portion of the conductor where little current flows. This hardly affects the AC resistance, but considerably reduces the weight of the conductor. The high strength but low weight of tubes substantially increases span capability. Tubular conductors are typical in electric power switchyards where the distance between supporting insulators may be several meters. Long spans generally exhibit physical sag but this does not affect electrical performance. To avoid losses, the conductivity of the tube material must be high.

In high current situations where conductors (round or flat busbar) may be between 5 and 50 mm thick skin effect also occurs at sharp bends where the metal is compressed inside the bend and stretched outside the bend. The shorter path at the inner surface results in a lower resistance, which causes most of the current to be concentrated close to the inner bend surface. This causes an increase in temperature at that region compared with the straight (unbent) area of the same conductor. A similar skin effect occurs at the corners of rectangular conductors (viewed in cross-section), where the magnetic field is more concentrated at the corners than in the sides. This results in superior performance (i.e. higher current with lower temperature rise) from wide thin conductors (for example, ribbon conductors) in which the effects from corners are effectively eliminated.

It follows that a transformer with a round core will be more efficient than an equivalent-rated transformer having a square or rectangular core of the same material.

Solid or tubular conductors may be silver-plated to take advantage of silver's higher conductivity. This technique is particularly used at VHF to microwave frequencies where the small skin depth requires only a very thin layer of silver, making the improvement in conductivity very cost effective. Silver plating is similarly used on the surface of waveguides used for transmission of microwaves. This reduces attenuation of the propagating wave due to resistive losses affecting the accompanying eddy currents; skin effect confines such eddy currents to a very thin surface layer of the waveguide structure. Skin effect itself is not actually combatted in these cases, but the distribution of currents near the conductor's surface makes the use of precious metals (having a lower resistivity) practical. Although it has a lower conductivity than copper and silver, gold plating is also used, because unlike copper and silver, it does not corrode. A thin oxidized layer of copper or silver would have a low conductivity, and so would cause large power losses as the majority of the current would still flow through this layer.

Recently, a method of layering non-magnetic and ferromagnetic materials with nanometer scale thicknesses has been shown to mitigate the increased resistance from skin effect for very high-frequency applications. A working theory is that the behavior of ferromagnetic materials in high frequencies results in fields and/or currents that oppose those generated by relatively nonmagnetic materials, but more work is needed to verify the exact mechanisms. As experiments have shown, this has potential to greatly improve the efficiency of conductors operating in tens of GHz or higher. This has strong ramifications for 5G communications.

== Examples ==
Skin depth vs. frequency for some materials at room temperature, red vertical line denotes 50 Hz frequency: Mn-Zn – magnetically soft ferrite; Al – metallic aluminum; Cu – metallic copper; steel 410 – magnetic stainless steel; Fe-Si – grain-oriented electrical steel; Fe-Ni – high-permeability permalloy (80%Ni-20%Fe)

We can derive a practical formula for skin depth as follows:
$$\begin{align}
\delta &= \frac{1}{\alpha} = \sqrt{{2\rho }\over{(2 \pi f) (\mu_0 \mu_r)}} \\
&= \frac{1}{\sqrt{\pi f \mu \sigma}} \approx 503\,\sqrt{\frac{\rho}{\mu_r f}}
\approx 503\,\frac{1}{\sqrt{\mu_r f \sigma}},
\end{align}$$

where

- $\delta =$ the skin depth in meters
- $\alpha =$ the attenuation in $\frac{Np}{m}$
- $\mu_0 =$ the permeability of free space
- $\mu =$ the permeability of the medium
- $\sigma =$ the conductivity of the medium (for copper, $\sigma \approx$ 58.5×10^{6} S/m)
- $f =$ the frequency of the current in Hz

Gold is a good conductor with a resistivity of 2.44×10^{−8} Ω·m and is essentially nonmagnetic: $\mu_r =$ 1, so its skin depth at a frequency of 50 Hz is given by
$$\delta = 503 \,\sqrt{\frac{2.44 \cdot 10^{-8}}{1 \cdot 50}}= 11.1\,\mathrm{mm}$$

Lead, in contrast, is a relatively poor conductor (among metals) with a resistivity of 2.2×10^{−7} Ω·m, about 9 times that of gold. Its skin depth at 50 Hz is likewise found to be about 33 mm, or $\sqrt{9} = 3$ times that of gold.

Highly magnetic materials have a reduced skin depth owing to their large permeability $\mu_r$ as was pointed out above for the case of iron, despite its poorer conductivity. A practical consequence is seen by users of induction cookers, where some types of stainless steel cookware are unusable because they are not ferromagnetic.

At very high frequencies skin depth for good conductors becomes tiny. For instance, skin depths of some common metals at a frequency of 10 GHz (microwave region) are less than a micrometer:

Skin depths at microwave frequencies
Conductor	Skin depth (μm)
Aluminum	0.820
Copper	0.652
Gold	0.753
Silver	0.634

Thus at microwave frequencies, most of the current flows in an extremely thin region near the surface. Ohmic losses of waveguides at microwave frequencies are therefore only dependent on the surface coating of the material. A layer of silver 3 μm thick evaporated on a piece of glass is thus an excellent conductor at such frequencies.

In copper, skin depth can be seen to fall according to the square root of frequency:

Skin depth in copper
Frequency	Skin depth (μm)
50 Hz	9220
60 Hz	8420
10 kHz	652
100 kHz	206
1 MHz	65.2
10 MHz	20.6
100 MHz	6.52
1 GHz	2.06

In Engineering Electromagnetics, Hayt points out that in a power station a busbar for alternating current at 60 Hz with a radius larger than one-third of an inch (8 mm) is a waste of copper, and in practice bus bars for heavy AC current are rarely more than half an inch (12 mm) thick except for mechanical reasons.

== Electromagnetic waves ==
In electromagnetic waves, the skin depth is the depth at which the amplitude of the electric and magnetic fields have reduced by $\frac{1}{e}$. The intensity of the wave is proportional to the square of the amplitude, and thus the depth at which the intensity has diminished by $\frac{1}{e}$ is $\frac{\delta}2.$ In waveguides, losses due to induced currents occur mostly within one skin depth of the surface. Thus, plating the surface of a waveguide with a material which has a low skin depth reduces losses.

== Anomalous skin effect ==
For high frequencies and low temperatures, the usual formulas for skin depth break down. This effect was first noticed by Heinz London in 1940, who correctly suggested that it is due to the mean free path length of the electrons reaching the range of the classical skin depth. Mattis–Bardeen theory was developed for this specific case for metals and superconductors.

== See also ==
- Proximity effect (electromagnetism)
- Eddy current
- Litz wire
- Transformer
- Induction cooking
- Induction heating
- Magnetic Reynolds number
- Wheeler incremental inductance rule, a method for estimating skin effect resistance
