= Penile plethysmography =

Measurement of bloodflow to the penis

Penile plethysmograph
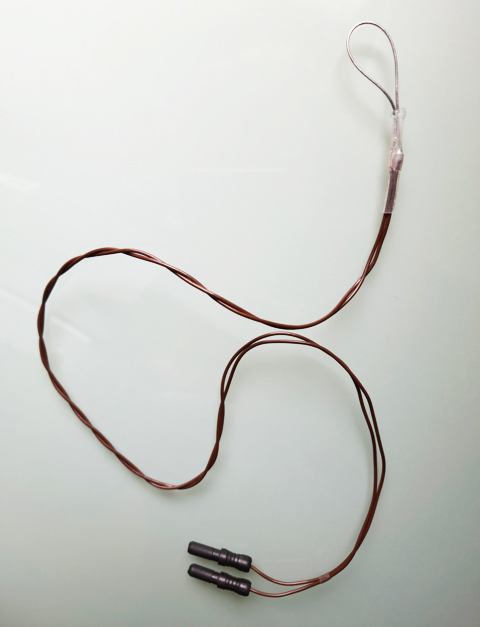
- Penile plethysmograph for measuring male sexual arousal.
- Other names: Phallometry
- ICD-9-CM: 89.58

Penile plethysmography (PPG) or phallometry is a measurement of blood flow to the penis, typically used as a proxy for measurement of sexual arousal. The most commonly reported methods of conducting penile plethysmography involves the measurement of the circumference of the penis with a mercury-in-rubber or electromechanical strain gauge, or the volume of the penis with an airtight cylinder and inflatable cuff at the base of the penis. Corpora cavernosa nerve penile plethysmographs measure changes in response to inter-operative electric stimulation during surgery. The volumetric procedure was invented by Kurt Freund and is considered to be particularly sensitive at low arousal levels. The easier to use circumferential measures are more widely used, however, and more common in studies using erotic film stimuli. A corresponding device in women is the vaginal photoplethysmograph.

For sexual offenders it is typically used to determine the level of sexual arousal as the subject is exposed to sexually suggestive content, such as pictures, movies or audio, although some have argued that phallometry is not always appropriate for the evaluation of sexual preferences or treatment effects. A 1998 large-scale meta-analytic review of the scientific reports demonstrated that phallometric response to stimuli depicting children, though only having a .32 correlation with future sex offending (accounting for approximately 10% of the variance), had the highest accuracy among methods of identifying which sexual offenders will go on to commit new sexual crimes. (None of the methods were strong predictors with most accounting for far less than 10% of the variance).

In prostatectomy nerve-sparing surgery, the surgeon applies a mild electrical stimulation near the cavernous nerves of penis to verify their locations and avoid operative trauma. Damage to these difficult-to-see nerves can cause erectile dysfunction outcomes. At the surgery's conclusion, the electrical stimulation penile plethysmograph result is a prognosis which helps to manage the erectile function outcomes earlier than the many months required for recovery.

== Types ==
There are two types of penile plethysmograph:

- Volumetric air chamber

When this is placed over the subject's penis, as tumescence increases, the air displaced is measured.

- Circumferential transducer

This uses a mercury-in-rubber or indium/gallium-in-rubber ring or electromechanical strain gauge and is placed around the shaft of the subject's penis to measure changes in circumference.

The circumferential type is more common, but the volumetric method is believed to be more accurate at low arousal levels.

Significant suppliers of PPG machines include Behavioral Technology Inc. and Medical Monitoring Systems. The device is known to be used in Brazil, Britain, Canada, China, Czech Republic, Hong Kong, New Zealand, Norway, Slovak Republic, Spain, and the United States.

The surgical machine is supplied as CaverMap by Blue Torch Medical Technology, Inc.

A roughly equivalent procedure for women, vaginal photoplethysmography, measures blood through the walls of the vagina, which researchers claim increases during sexual arousal.

== Methodology ==
Exact procedures can vary, but in one study a seventeen-year-old male sex offender was, at the start of each daily session, privately fitted with a Parks Medical Electronics mercury strain gauge attached to his penis and worn under trousers and underwear. The device had previously been calibrated with measurements from his penis in its flaccid state and at full erection as achieved through masturbation. This device was connected to a microprocessor, a battery pack, and a strain gauge amplifier, all of which were kept discreetly in a fanny pack. He was then driven daily to a college campus for multiple sessions to assess his sexual attraction to women and men, who were about 30–100 feet away from him. While remaining in a parked car, he was instructed to focus on either a specific woman or a specific man in the setting, imagine himself having sex with them, and allow himself to become sexually aroused if he was so inclined. The device then measured the percentage of full erection that he achieved. This was repeated over a period of 24 days, with the results showing a significantly greater level of attraction to women, especially when research staff were discreetly absent.

== History ==
The original volumetric was developed during the 1950s by Kurt Freund in then-Czechoslovakia. Freund later wrote, "In the early fifties homosexual interaction was still an indictable offense in Czechoslovakia. I was of course opposed to this measure, but I still thought, as did my colleagues at the psychiatric university hospital in Prague where I was working, that homosexuality was an experientially acquired neurosis". He then developed phallometry to replace psychoanalytic methods of assessment because "[P]sychoanalysis had turned out to be a failure, virtually unusable as an instrument for individual diagnosis or research....When phallometry began to look promising as a test of erotic sex and age preferences, we started using it mainly as a test of pedophilia, that is determining who has an erotic preference for children over adults".

In post-World War II Czechoslovakia, Freund was assigned by the communist government the task of identifying among military conscripts men who were falsely declaring themselves to be gay to avoid the draft. "Freund (1957) developed the first device, which measured penile volume changes... to distinguish heterosexual and homosexual males for the Czechoslovak army." When he escaped Europe for Canada, Freund was able to pursue his research using phallometry for the assessment of sexual offenders. At that time, attempts to develop methods of changing homosexual men into heterosexual men were being made by many sexologists, including John Bancroft, Albert Ellis, and William Masters of the Masters and Johnson Institute. Because phallometry showed that such methods were failures, Freund was among the first sexologists to declare that such attempts were unethical. Based primarily on Freund's studies, decriminalization of homosexuality took place in Czechoslovakia in 1961. (See also LGBT rights in the Czech Republic.)

== Reliability and validity ==
In 1994, the Diagnostic and Statistical Manual of Mental Disorders (Fourth Edition) of the American Psychiatric Association stated that penile plethysmography has been used in research settings to assess various paraphilias by measuring an individual's sexual arousal in response to visual and auditory stimuli. The reliability and validity of this procedure in clinical assessment have not been well established, and clinical experience suggests that subjects can simulate response by manipulating mental images." In contrast, a 2017 recent meta-analysis provides support for the validity of phallometric testing as a measure of sexual interests in children across 37 samples and 6,785 individuals.

In 1998, Hanson and Bussière published a comprehensive meta-analysis of 61 scientific reports on the prediction of sexual offenses spanning more than 40,000 individual cases. They ascertained that of all the methods attempted and reported, penile phethysmographic responses to imagery depicting children was the single most accurate predictor of sexual re-offense across 7 studies reporting data from phallometric testing. Another meta-analysis in 2005 of 13 studies and 2,180 individual cases repeated the finding that phallometric responses to children was a strong predictor of sexual re-offense.

A 2017 meta-analysis that included 16 samples and 2,709 sexual offenders replicated and extended the previous findings that phallometric responding to children is a predictor of sexual re-offence. This meta-analysis extended previous meta-analytic research by showing phallometric responding to both male and female pedophilic and hebephilic stimuli predict sexual re-offence. Further, this meta-analysis showed that phallometric testing predicts sexual re-offence in distinct subgroups of sexual offenders against children.

=== Critique of methodological problems ===
There are criticisms of the methodology used to determine the reliability and specificity of penile plethysmography. One such criticism is that while penile plethysmography is said to be important for being more objective than a test subject's subjective reports on sexual arousal, the argument for penile plethysmography being a more reliable gauge of sexual arousal than vaginal plethysmography is still that there is a higher correspondence on average between what the test subjects report and what the instruments observe in male subjects than in female subjects. There is a criticism of this discrepancy for lacking consistency in the standards of whether or not subjective reports are useful. There is also criticism regarding the possibility of sampling bias being greater in male subjects of penile plethysmography than in female subjects of vaginal plethysmography, males being generally more aware of their physical sexual responses than females in most cultures may cause the male volunteers to be almost exclusively individuals who have category specific erections due to those with nonspecific erections fearing erection in taboo contexts and therefore not signing up for the studies. This effect may explain apparent male specificity as a result of methodological bias. The difference between tests of volunteers and tests of convicted or suspected sex offenders in penile plethysmography results may be caused by the sex offender group often effectively lacking the choice not to volunteer, without difference in erection patterns from the average population. One criticism of reoffending studies is that cultural attitudes that assume that men are sexually attracted to what they phallometrically respond to may cause men with no actual sexual interest in children to identify as pedophiles due to knowing that they phallometrically respond to them, making them more likely to be convicted again.

== Utility ==
=== Erectile dysfunction ===
The penile plethysmograph has value in screening organic versus psychogenic erectile dysfunction in urological polysomnography centres. Lack of sexual response during REM sleep may indicate that further evaluation by a urologist is required.

When applied during nerve-sparing surgery, electrical stimulation penile plethysmograph is an erectile dysfunction prognostic. The patient is provided with objective information on his specific outcome which aids in planning for further erectile function therapies.

=== Pedophilia, hebephilia, pedohebephilia, and ephebophilia ===
Studies examining the efficiency of using penile plethysmograph to distinguish pedophilic men from non-pedophilic men, including hebephiles, show that a majority can be correctly assigned to the proper category. Sensitivity of a phallometric test is defined as the accuracy of the test to identify pedophilic (or hebephilic) individuals as having these sexual interests. Specificity of these tests is defined as the accuracy of the test to identify non-pedophilic (or non-hebephilic) individuals as such. Meta-analytic research has shown that sexual offenders against children show greater responding on phallometric tests for pedophilia and hebephilia than controls.

==== Volumetric penile plethysmography ====
In one study, 21% of the subjects were excluded for various reasons, including "the subject's erotic age-preference was uncertain and his phallometrically diagnosed sex-preference was the same as his verbal claim" and attempts to influence the outcome of the test. This study found the sensitivity for identifying pedohebephilia in sexual offenders against children admitting to this interest to be 100%. In addition, the sensitivity for this phallometric test in partially admitting sexual offenders against children was found to be 77% and for denying sexual offenders against children to be 58%. The specificity of this volumetric phallometric test for pedohebephilia was estimated to be 95%.

Further studies by Freund have estimated the sensitivity of a volumetric test for pedohebephilia to be 35% for sexual offenders against children with a single female victim, 70% for those with two or more female victims, 77% for those offenders with one male victim, and 84% for those with two or more male victims. In this study, the specificity of the test was estimated to be 81% in community males and 97% in sexual offenders against adults. In a similar study, the sensitivity of a volumetric test for pedophilia to be 62% for sexual offenders against children with a single female victim, 90% for those with two or more female victims, 76% for those offenders with one male victim, and 95% for those with two or more male victims.

In a separate study, sensitivity of the method to distinguish between pedohebephilic men from non-pedohebephilic men was estimated between 29% and 61% depending on subgroup. Specifically, sensitivity was estimated to be 61% for sexual offenders against children with three or more victims and 34% in incest offenders. The specificity of the test using a sample of sexual offenders against adults was 96% and the area under the curve for the test was estimated to be .86. Further research by this group found the specificity of this test to be 83% in a sample of non-offenders. More recent research has found volumetric phallometry to have a sensitivity of 72% for pedophilia, 70% for hebephilia, and 75% for pedohebephilia and a specificity of 95%, 91%, and 91% for these paraphilias, respectively.

==== Circumferential penile plethysmography ====
Other studies have examined the sensitivity and specificity of circumferential phallometry to identify different sexual interests in children. Sensitivity for a circumferential phallometric test for pedophilia has been estimated to be 63% in sexual offenders against children, 65% in extrafamilial offenders against children and 68.4% in incest offenders. Additional research has found different circumferential phallometric tests to have a sensitivity of 93%, 96%, 35%, 78%, and 50% in sexual offenders against children. In incest offenders, the sensitivity of circumferential phallometric tests has been estimated as 19% and 60% in extrafamilial offenders against children. In terms of specificity of these tests for pedophilia, research has estimated the specificity as 92%, 82%, 76%, and 92% in samples of community males and 80% and 92% in sexual offenders against adults.

A single study has examined the accuracy of a circumferential phallometric test for hebephilia. This study found the sensitivity of the hebephilia test to be 70% in extrafamilial offenders against children and 52% in incest offenders. In addition, the specificity for this phallometric test was 68% in a sample of community males.

Other studies have found different phallometric tests for pedohebephilia to have a sensitivity of 75% in incest offenders, 67% in extrafamilial offenders against children, and 64%, 64%, 44%, and 53%, in sexual offenders against children.

In addition, Abel and colleagues found ephebophilic stimuli to have a sensitivity of 50%.

Another study examined the possibility that juvenile sex offenders might be able to suppress arousal deemed deviant. Of the juveniles who exhibited sexual arousal, categorization was made into two age appropriate categories—Adult and Peer responders—and three age inappropriate categories—Child, Child/Adult, and Nondiscriminating responders—based on whether they had the greatest sexual arousal in response to adult female, peer female, or younger child female stimuli. Sexual arousal in response to older adult women or peers was deemed age appropriate; sexual arousal in response to significantly younger females was deemed inappropriate. Many of the juveniles who denied responsibility for their offenses showed no sexual arousal at all—however about one-third still showed age inappropriate arousal despite denying responsibility for their offenses.

=== Biastophilia ===
There is some evidence that phallometry can distinguish groups of men with biastophilia (a paraphilia involving rape) from groups of men without it.

== Legal admissibility ==
In general, phallometric test results are employed as part of the sentencing and rehabilitation phase of forensic systems, but not for determining whether a specific defendant is guilty of any specific offense against any specific person.

=== United States ===
==== Use as trial evidence ====
In the United States, a scientific technique could not be used as evidence in court unless the technique was "generally accepted" as reliable in the relevant scientific community. This was known as the Frye standard, adopted in 1923. In 1993, the doctrine was rejected by the Supreme Court of the United States in favor of a more comprehensive "reliable foundation" test in Daubert v. Merrell Dow Pharmaceuticals. In the Daubert standard, the "generally accepted" test was no longer determinative. Several other factors could now be considered, including whether the technique had been published and peer-reviewed. Myers notes, "Courts that have considered penile plethysmography generally rule that the technique is not sufficiently reliable for use in court."

In United States v. Powers the court excluded the penile plethysmograph test because it failed to qualify under Daubert's scientific validity prong for two reasons: the scientific literature does not regard the test as a valid diagnostic tool, and "a vast majority of incest offenders who do not admit their guilt, such as Powers, show a normal reaction to the test. The Government argues that such false negatives render the test unreliable."

According to Barker and Howell, penile plethysmography (PPG) does not meet the legal threshold for the guilt phase for the following reasons:

- No standardization
- Test results are not sufficiently accurate
- Results are subject to faking and voluntary control by test subjects
- High incidence of false negatives and false positives
- Results are open to interpretation

They concluded, "Until a way can be devised to detect and/or control false negatives and false positives, the validity of the test data will be questionable." Responding to Barker and Howell, Simon and Schouten noted, "Our own analysis suggests that the standardization and faking issues, as well as other problems not addressed in the Barker and Howell paper, warrant much more guarded conclusions about the use of the plethysmograph in legal and clinical settings." Prentky noted "the increased likelihood in forensic settings that dissimulation may compromise the validity of the assessment." Hall and Crowther noted penile plethysmography "may be even more problematic than other [methods] in assessing susceptibility of the test to faking."

In State of North Carolina v. Spencer, the court reviewed the literature and case law and concluded that penile plethysmography was scientifically unreliable: "Despite the sophistication of the current equipment technology, a question remains whether the information emitted is a valid and reliable means of assessing sexual preference."

More recently, a substantial amount of research data has been gathered and reviewed, and significant steps have been taken toward standardization. According to researcher Gilles Launay, "[T]he validity of the technique for research and clinical assessment is now established;" it is only the use in guilt-determination proceedings that is inappropriate. Fedoroff and Moran called it an "experimental procedure" and noted, "Virtually every expert who has written about phallometry has cautioned that it is insufficiently sensitive or specific to be used to determine the guilt or innocence of a person accused of a sex crime."

==== Post-conviction use ====
Phallometry is widely considered appropriate for treatment and supervision of convicted sex offenders: "Courts have permitted plethysmographic testing for monitoring compliance by convicted sex offenders with the conditions of their community placement as part of crime-related treatment for sexual deviancy." Its use for the treatment and management of sexual offenders is recommended by the Association for the Treatment of Sexual Abusers. Becker notes it "should never be used exclusively in forensic decision making." The sexual assault trial of basketball player Kobe Bryant in Colorado brought this device and its use to public attention before the case was dropped in 2004, because Colorado law would have required evaluation with this device following conviction. The United States Court of Appeals for the Ninth Circuit recently addressed the procedures required before a federal supervised release program could include penile plethysmograph testing. The device is routinely used at civil commitment facilities, but "some clinicians and offenders say it is easy, particularly in a laboratory, to stifle arousal and thus cheat on a plethysmograph test." This has been reported to occur in 16% of cases.

During the Catholic sex abuse cases, the reliability of the test was questioned by some officials in the Roman Catholic Archdiocese of Philadelphia. Later, these officials chose to seek therapy at an institution where the plethysmograph was not used.

=== Canada ===
Courts in Canada came to a similar conclusion as those in the United States. The Supreme Court of Canada adopted the Daubert doctrine in R. v . J.-L.J. [2000] 2 S.C.R. 600, which upheld a lower court's decision to exclude testimony by a psychiatrist who had administered several tests on the accused, including a penile plethysmograph:

A level of reliability that is quite useful in therapy because it yields some information about a course of treatment is not necessarily sufficiently reliable to be used in a court of law to identify or exclude the accused as a potential perpetrator of an offence. In fact, penile plethysmography has received a mixed reception in Quebec courts: Protection de la jeunesse – 539, [1992] R.J.Q. 1144; R. c. Blondin, [1996] Q.J. No. 3605 (QL) (S.C.); L. Morin and C. Boisclair in "La preuve d'abus sexuel: allégations, déclarations et l'évaluation d'expert" (1992), 23 R.D.U.S. 27. Efforts to use penile plethysmography in the United States as proof of disposition have largely been rejected: People v. John W., 185 Cal.App.3d 801 (1986); Gentry v. State, 443 S.E.2d 667 (Ga. Ct. App. 1994); United States v. Powers, 59 F.3d 1460 (4th Cir. 1995); State v. Spencer, 459 S.E.2d 812 (N.C. App. 1995); J. E. B. Myers et al., "Expert Testimony in Child Sexual Abuse Litigation" (1989), 68 Neb. L. Rev. 1, at pp. 134-35; J. G. Barker and R. J. Howell, "The Plethysmograph: A Review of Recent Literature" (1992), 20 Bull. Am. Acad. of Psychiatry & L. 13.

—

As of 2010, all youth in sex offender treatment programs administered by the Youth Forensic Psychiatric Service of British Columbia were offered a voluntary penile plethysmograph test to predict whether they can properly control their deviant arousal, or whether they will require medication or other forms of treatment. According to sceptics, however, the test does not reliably predict recurrent violations.

=== Ethics and legality of use ===
Robert Todd Carroll writes, "More objectionable than the questionable scientific validity of the device, however, are the moral and legal questions its use raises." Carroll and others cite the legality of the depictions of minors, as well as the constitutionality of requiring PPG for admission to jobs or the military, or in custody cases. In Harrington v. Almy the United States Court of Appeals for the First Circuit found that a PPG ordered to be administered by William O'Donohue as a precondition of employment was a violation of plaintiff's rights under the Fourteenth Amendment to the United States Constitution. In a 2009 report led by Robert Clift on use of the device on adolescent offenders, the authors acknowledge in their conclusions that PPG tests "are problematic ethically and should be used only after therapists have carefully weighed the benefits versus the negatives." The Minister of Children and Family Development closed the program examined in Clift's report in 2010 following complaints by civil rights groups. The principal manufacturer of the device stopped making them in the 1990s.

The EU's leading human rights agency, the Fundamental Rights Agency, has criticised the use of phallometric tests by the Czech Republic to determine whether asylum seekers presenting themselves as homosexual were in fact gay. According to the Agency, the Czech Republic was in 2010 the only EU country to employ a sexual arousal test, which the Agency said could violate the European Convention on Human Rights. In 2011 the EU commission issued a statement calling the Czech practice illegal, saying "The practice of phallometric tests constitutes a strong interference with the person's private life and human dignity. This kind of degrading treatment should not be accepted in the European Union, nor elsewhere." The Czech Interior Ministry replied that the testing was conducted only after written consent has been obtained, and when it was not possible to use a different method of verification. According to the Ministry, all those who had passed the test had been granted asylum.

== See also ==
- Clitoral photoplethysmograph
- Labial thermistor clip
- Polygraph
- Sexual concordance
- Sexological testing
