= Somnophilia =

Sexual arousal from an unconscious person

Somnophilia (from Latin somnus "sleep" and Greek φιλία, -philia "friendship") is a paraphilia in which an individual becomes sexually aroused by someone who is asleep or unconscious. The Dictionary of Psychology categorized somnophilia within the classification of predatory paraphilias.

== Origin ==
The term somnophilia was coined by John Money in 1986. He characterized the condition as a type of sexual fetishism, described as a type of syndrome: "of the marauding-predatory type in which erotic arousal and facilitation or attainment of orgasm are responsive to and dependent on intruding upon" someone who is unable to respond. He wrote that often the condition then subsequently involves the individual waking the unresponsive sexual partner after the act has been committed.

According to Money, somnophilia has a sort of stepwise logic with necrophilia. He characterized it as a form of "stealth and stealing paraphilias" including kleptophilia. Money wrote that somnophilia has a high degree of correlation with acts of incest throughout history. Abuse may follow from the condition including use of force or abduction. Typically, the individual upon whom the sex act is committed by the somnophiliac is a stranger not previously known intimately to the individual. The somnophiliac may create an unconscious state in the victim by drugging them, or may engage in sex with someone who is inebriated or asleep. The perpetrator becomes attracted to the idea of a sexual participant who is unable to resist their advances.

Diagnostic and Statistical Manual of Mental Disorders classified the term in 2000 under DSM-IV TR code 302.9 and in the International Statistical Classification of Diseases and Related Health Problems under ICD-10 code F65.9. The Dictionary of Psychology categorized somnophilia within the classification of predatory paraphilias.

== Prevalence ==
A 2015 study with a sample of 1516 participants reported that 22.6% of men and 10.8% of women have fantasized about "sexually abusing a person who is drunk, asleep, or unconscious." Another 2021 study by Michael Seto found that 9% of its participants have had interest in "sex with someone who is unconscious or sleeping" and 7.7% engaged in such behavior. A third study reported that 82% of its sample have had interest in engaging in consensual sexual activities with a sleeping partner, and 47% reported some interest in non-consensual somnophilic activities. These studies suggest that somnophilic fantasies are more common than previously thought, though possible sample biases have been identified in some of them. Researchers including Danielle Knafo note the importance of distinguishing between somnophilic sex as a crime and as a fantasy, role-play, or fetish activity between consenting partners.

== Treatment ==
Physicians have attempted to treat somnophilia with forms of psychotherapy, as well as with medications used for pedophilia. James Cantor, psychologist and editor-in-chief of Sexual Abuse: A Journal of Research and Treatment, stated: "There are occasional claims for treatment, but no one has presented meaningful, compelling evidence that someone with a paraphilia can be turned into someone without a paraphilia. As far as we can tell, it's like sexual orientation." Somnophilia rises to the level of diagnosis when it causes "significant impairment", specifically, when the individual performing the sex act does so with a partner who does not give their consent.

== In popular culture ==
Somnophilia has presented itself as a recurring phenomenon in popular culture, including in the French film influenced by Alfred Hitchcock movies, Who Killed Bambi? (French: Qui a tué Bambi ?). The plot of the film involves a surgeon who drugs his female patients in order to rape them. The assailant resorts to murder after one of the women wakes up from her unconscious state as he begins to remove her clothing. The title character attempts to warn the board of directors at the hospital of the murderer's activity.

In the 1978 American comedy film National Lampoon's Animal House, a college student contemplates sexual intercourse with a dead-drunk girl until his conscience (represented by an angel) gets the better of his brief somnophilia (represented by a devil).

In the 1997 Japanese anime film The End of Evangelion, the main protagonist Shinji Ikari masturbates in a fit of intense melancholia to a comatose Asuka Langley Soryu lying on a hospital bed.

== See also ==
- Necrophilia
- Agalmatophilia
- Acquaintance rape
- Biastophilia
- Date rape
- Nocturnal penile tumescence
- Nocturnal emission
- Rape fantasy
- Sleep sex
