= Sexological testing =

Aspect of the study of sexuality

Sexuality can be inscribed in a multidimensional model comprising different aspects of human life: biology, reproduction, culture, entertainment, relationships and love.

In the last decades, a growing interest towards sexuality and a greater quest to acknowledge a "right to sexuality" has occurred both in society and individuals. The consequence of this evolution has been a renewed and more explicit call for intervention from those who suffer, or think they suffer from alterations of their sexual and relational sphere.

This has produced an increased attention of medicine and psychology towards sexual dysfunctions and the problems they cause in individuals and couples. Science has gradually adjusted already existing research tools, mostly used in other fields of clinical research, to the field of sexology, so completing and increasing the number of tools in the "toolkit" of various branches of sexological diagnosis.

Psychological measurements cannot be considered as accurate as physical ones (weight, height, mass, etc.), as the former evaluate those aspects and variables pertaining to an "individual" whose individuality refers to his/her own psychological, personological and environmental constituents: emotions, expressiveness, senses, feelings and experiences which can greatly vary according to the subjects and change in the short period or depending on different settings, even in the same individual.

What is expected of psychological measurements is "sufficient" accuracy and reliability, i.e. capability to express an indication or focus which clinicians can use as a "guideline" to rapidly and accurately deepen the aspects highlighted by the measurements and check them together with their patients. For this purpose, several statistical validation indexes of psychodiagnostic tests are provided: from standardization to various constructions of validity (internal, external, face, construct, convergent, content, discriminant, etc.).

There are several sexual dysfunctions and each of them has a different cause. Therefore, the field of sexology provides different psychological evaluation devices in order to examine the various aspects of the discomfort, problem or dysfunction, regardless of whether they are individual or relational ones.

The number of psychodiagnostic reactives is certainly wide and heterogeneous, nevertheless, the number of tests specifically meant for the field of sexology is quite limited. The following list (in alphabetical order) is not exhaustive but shows the best known and/or most used reactives in the field of sexological and relational psychodiagnosis.

== Index ==
=== ASEX (Arizona Sexual Experience Scale) ===
- ASEX - Arizona Sexual Experience Scale

This test is intended for the assessment of sexual dysfunctions in psychiatric patients and people with health problems (men and women). It particularly evaluates modifications and alterations of sexual functions in relation to the intake of medicines or psychotropic substances.
This self-report questionnaire can be both administered by a clinician or self-administered. It is made up of five items rated on a 6-point Likert scale. Each item explores a particular aspect of sexuality: 1. Sexual drive, 2. Arousal, 3a. Penile erection; 3b. Vaginal lubrication, 4. Ability to reach orgasm, 5. Satisfaction from orgasm.
Only one item of the scale has a male and a female version (3a – 3b).
This test provides good reliability indexes with a Cronbach's coefficient alpha of 0.90 and correlation (at intervals of 1 and 2 weeks) with r = 0.80. The "validity of the construction" has been evaluated by several studies through differences in the scores obtained by sample groups (dysfunctional patients) and control groups.
Convergent and discriminant validity have been measured comparing the results obtained by ASEX with those obtained by other tests. Particularly, it has been found a significant correlation between ASEX and BISF (Brief Index of Sexual Functioning), while little correlation has been noticed between ASEX and HRSD - Hamilton Rating Scale for Depression and BDI - Beck Depression Inventory.

=== ASKAS (Aging Sexuality Knowledge and Attitudes Scale) ===
- ASKAS - Aging Sexuality Knowledge and Attitudes Scale

This questionnaire is aimed at knowing sexuality and sexual attitudes in the elderly. It is made up of 61 items divided into two subscales: "Knowledge subscale", a 35-item scale with "True/False" and "I don't know" answers and "Attitudes subscale" which is composed of 26 items rated on a 7-point Likert scale. Both subscales provide good reliability indexes (from 0.97 to 0.72) for Cronbach's alpha, test-retest and split half methods measured on different types of groups: Nursing home resident, Community older adults, Family of older adults, Persons who work with older adults, Nursing home staff.
According to several studies carried out by the same author, sexual behaviour and attitudes during older age reflects those adopted during younger age, in fact:

- those people who were sexually active during youth tend to maintain this behaviour during older age;
- negative attitudes towards sex learned during youth can significantly affect the ability to have good sexuality during older age.

ASKAS has been used to study the effects of sexual education on the attitudes of nursing home residents, their relatives and nursing home staff towards sexuality in the elderly. It has been noted that, after receiving sexual education, nursing home staff and relatives were more tolerant towards sexual intercourse in older age. Moreover, there was a significant increase in the sexual activity and satisfaction in those elderly people who had been given sexual education.
An Italian survey carried out through a translated version of ASKAS among general practitioners has found that almost the entire sample (N=95) knew that sexuality is a lifelong need and it is not hazardous to elderly people's health, but, at the same time, it has revealed a lot of fallacies, confusion, stereotypes and lack of accurate knowledge of sexuality in old men and old women.
Several studies carried out in the fields of medicine and psychology throughout the world, have confirmed that this test can be used in order to assess elderly people and to survey their relatives and those professionals (helping profession) working close to them: doctors, psychologists and social workers.

=== BSRI (Bem Sex-Role Inventory) ===
- BSRI – Bem Sex-Role Inventory

Self-administering questionnaire (60 items in all) measures masculinity (20 items), femininity (20 items), androgyny (20 items), using the masculinity and femininity scales.

The concept of psychological androgyny implies that it is possible for an individual to be both compassionate and assertive, both expressive and instrumental, both feminine and masculine, depending upon the situational appropriateness of these various modalities.

=== PSESQ33 (Parental Sexual Education Styles Questionnaire) ===
- PSESQ33 – Parental Sexual Education Styles Questionnaire

this questionnaire was first developed by Abdollahzadeh and Keykhosravi (2020). The attitude of parents to their children's sexual education has an effect on their sexual behavior and interaction with their children. No specific measurement tool has ever been developed to evaluate and measure this matter. The aim of present study was to develop a parental sexual education style questionnaire and determine its psychometric criteria.Three factors were extracted from the results of confirmatory factor analysis, including strict sexual education style, permissive sexual education style and authoritative education style. In general, all three factors were able to explain 50.32% of variance related to 33 items of the questionnaire. The value of Cranach's alpha coefficient was obtained equal to 0.751 for whole of the questionnaire. Also, the value of Cranach's alpha for the first three components was equal to 0.739, 0.765 and 0.751, respectively. The Varimax rotation matrix showed that all questions are applicable to the extracted styles.

=== DAS (Dyadic Adjustment Scale) ===
- DAS - Dyadic Adjustment Scale

This scale is made up of 32 items which explore four interdependent dimensions in order to evaluate relational adaptation between husband and wife: agreement between husband and wife on important matters, cohesion of the couple on common activities, satisfaction of the couple with the progress of their relationship, expression of satisfaction with their affective and sexual life.

=== DIQ (Diagnostic Impotence Questionnaire) ===
- DIQ - Diagnostic Impotence Questionnaire

This questionnaire (35 item) evaluates the different components in male erectile dysfunction: Vascular (V), Neurogenic (N), Hormonal (H), Psychogenic (P). The scores of V-N-H components provide information about those organic factors responsible for the dysfunction; the scores of P component indicate the influence of the psychogenic component. If the total score of V-N-H components is higher than the score of P component, then the organic etiology prevails over the psychogenic one (and vice versa). This device is useful in the clinic setting. However, due to the fact that it is not validated nor standardised, it must be used carefully in researches and screenings.

=== DSFI (Derogatis Sexual Function Inventory) ===
- DSFI - Derogatis Sexual Function Inventory

A standardised self-evaluation questionnaire made up of 258 items (245 in the original version published in 1975). It produces nine sexual dimensions (information, experience, sexual drive, attitudes, affectivity, sexual gender and role, sexual fantasies, body image and sexual satisfaction), a dimension about psychopathological symptoms (anxiety, depression and somatizations) and an SFI index (sexual functioning index). Due to the high number of items, it requires a considerable amount of time to be filled in.

=== EDITS (Erectile Dysfunction Inventory of Treatment Satisfaction) ===
- EDITS - Erectile Dysfunction Inventory of Treatment Satisfaction

A self-evaluation questionnaire on erectile dysfunction which is meant for male patients (13 items) and their partners (5 items). It explores achievements, perceived satisfaction, and treatment effectiveness. The items meant for male patients study expectations, effectiveness, side effects and their willingness to continue with the treatment. The items meant for their partners explore the changes occurred in the couple's sexual activity and allow to notice the concordance between the subjective answers of the patients and the objective ones provided by theirs partners.

=== EPES (Erotic Preferences Examination Scheme) ===
- EPES - Erotic Preferences Examination Scheme

This is one of the oldest self-report questionnaire measures of the various paraphilias listed in the American Psychiatric Association's Diagnostic and Statistical Manual of Mental Disorders (DSM).

The EPES includes scales for sexual masochism (11 items), sexual sadism (20 items), fetishism (8 items), cross-gender fetishism—transvestism (11 items), autogynephilia—a man's tendency to be erotically aroused by the thought or image of himself as a woman (8 items), pedophilia (18 items), hebephilia—the erotic preference for pubescent, as opposed to prepubescent, children (9 items), voyeurism (6 items), and exhibitionism (13 items). The alpha reliability coefficients for these scales run from 0.74 to 0.98.

The EPES is not copyrighted and can be used without special permission.

=== FACES (Family Adaptability and Cohesion Evaluation Scales) ===
- FACES - Family Adaptability and Cohesion Evaluation Scales

This scale is made up of 111 items exploring family relationships (children above 12 included) with regard to four degrees of "cohesion", i.e. emotional link between family members (regressed, attached, parted, disengaged) and four degrees of "adaptability" (chaotic, flexible, structured, rigid) i.e. capability of family members to reorganize in response to changes in the situations involving the family. A first revision (1993) called FACES-II reduced the scale to 30 items, whereas a second one (1995) called FACES-III further reduced the number of items to 20.

=== FGIS (Feminine Gender Identity Scale) ===
- FGIS - Feminine Gender Identity Scale

This scale is made up of 29 items. The questions touch on topics such as childhood playmate preference. Adolescent sexual experience, and sexual activity preference in details.

=== GRIMS (Golombok Rust Inventory of Marital State) ===
- GRIMS - Golombok Rust Inventory of Marital State

A 28-item questionnaire which is intended to analyse the features of dyadic relationships. It is often used in marriage counselling and couple's therapy. This inventory shows good psychometric features and is often used together with GRISS which is its individual version.

=== GRISS (Golombok Rust Inventory of Sexual Satisfaction) ===
- GRISS - Golombok Rust Inventory of Sexual Satisfaction

It consists of two questionnaires (i.e. a male and a female questionnaire) with 28 items each. It studies sexual dysfunctions in heterosexual subjects. It provides a total score and subscales scores: intercourse frequency, incommunicability, dissatisfaction, avoiding sexual intercourse, absence of sexuality, anorgasmia and vaginismus (only in the female version), impotence and premature ejaculation (only in the male version). It is provided with good psychometric features and is easy to administer due to the limited number of items. However, this feature limits its illustrative and diagnostic function.

=== HSAS (Hendrick Sexual Attitude Scale) ===
- HSAS - Hendrick Sexual Attitude Scale

A 43-item self-evaluation scale which explore subjects' attitude towards sexuality. The scale examines four sexuality-related factors: permissiveness, sexual practices, community (i.e. participation and involvement) and instrumentalism (i.e. pleasure-oriented sexuality).

=== IIEF (International Index of Erectile Function) ===
- IIEF - International Index of Erectile Function

This standardised and validated 15-item self-evaluation scale provides pre-post treatment clinic evaluations of erectile function, orgasmic function, sexual desire, satisfaction in sexual intercourse and general satisfaction. The IIEF-5 Sexual Health Inventory for Men, an abridged version of the IIEF, contains a shorter questionnaire of five items which takes into account the latest six months instead of the latest four weeks considered by the IIEF.

=== ISS (Index of Sexual Satisfaction) ===
- ISS - Index of Sexual Satisfaction

A 25-item questionnaire which psychometrically evaluates the preponderance of sexual components in the problems of a couple. Sexuality-related aspects in the couple are measured with regard to the feelings, attitudes, and events occurring during the relationship.

=== MAT (Marital Adjustment Test) ===
- MAT - Marital Adjustment Test

A 15-item questionnaire which evaluates intrarelational adaptation and the agreement between husband and wife about those behaviours they consider sensible and suitable for their marital life. Psychometric capabilities are limited due to its obsolescence.

=== MCI (Marital Communication Inventory) ===
- MCI - Marital Communication Inventory

This scale is made up of two questionnaires (i.e. a male and a female questionnaire) with 42 items each, which provide a total score on intra-couple communication and scores relative to six dimensions: communication, adjustment, intimacy and sexuality, children, jobs and income, and religious beliefs. This device shows a good reliability and internal consistency of the global score in comparison to the sub-dimensions.

=== MMPI-2 (Minnesota Multiphasic Personality Inventory) ===
- MMPI-2 - Minnesota Multiphasic Personality Inventory

A test published in 1942 by the University of Minnesota, it was revised in 1989 when the current version MMPI-2 was created (last release Restructured Form in 2003). The MMPI-2 is made up of a considerable number of items (567) which explore several features of personality pertaining psychology and psychiatry. There are also an abridged version (370 items) and a version called MMPI-A of 478 items (350 items in a short form) aimed at evaluating adolescent between the age of 14 and 18.
The dimensions taken into account are divided into: Basic Scales (which evaluate the most relevant features of personality), Content Scales (which analyse different variables of personality), Supplementary Scales (which further investigate some of the issues in the basic scales), Validity Scales (which define the degree of sincerity and accuracy in filling the questionnaire).
The evaluation of sexual and relational settings takes into account the following aspects: masculinity – femininity (i.e. those aspects typically viewed as masculine or feminine, considered as a whole), masculine and feminine gender role (i.e. perception of gender role), marital distress and family discord (i.e. conflicts within the couple), social introversion (i.e. difficulties in social relations).
Criticisms of this device relate to the amount of time required to fill it in (60–120 minutes) and to the fact that some of the Restructured Clinical Scales, although regarded as clearer and easier to interpret, raised some controversies in the academic world because they have been modified compared to those in the original version.

=== MPT (Marital Patterns Test) ===
- MPT - Marital Patterns Test

This test is made up of two questionnaires (i.e. a male and a female questionnaire) with 24 pairs of items each. They measure the dominance and willingness within the couple. Its validity has been improved thanks to a revision by Scott-Heyes (1982) whose title is RSMPT - Ryle/Scott-Heyes Marital Patterns Questionnaire.

=== MSI (Marital Satisfaction Inventory) ===
- MSI - Marital Satisfaction Inventory

A 280-item inventory which evaluates marital satisfaction with regard to 12 dimensions especially concerning conventionalism, affective communication, amount of time spent together, disagreement on financial problems, disagreement on children management and sexual satisfaction. A total score of the scales provides a "global discomfort" index defined by couple dissatisfaction, whereas a reduced version of this device (made up of 44 items) shows the "indifference" degree and the "disharmony" degree of the relationship.

=== PEQUEST (Premature Ejaculation Questionnaire) ===
- PEQUEST - Premature Ejaculation Questionnaire

A 36-item self-evaluation questionnaire for evaluating premature ejaculation. The ejaculative/orgasmic behaviour is explored in its various problematic aspects: persistence, significance, frequency, situational factors, psychological reaction of both partners, techniques adopted by the patient in order to coping the problem, adaptation and interference levels of the disturbance, performance anxiety, and partner's behaviour during sexual intercourse.

=== PREPARE-ENRICH (Premarital Personal and Relationship Evaluation) ===
- PREPARE-ENRICH Inventories

This inventory is made up of 125 items, subdivided into 14 subscales, which explore sexual intercourse, personal difficulties, marital satisfaction, couple cohesion, dyadic adaptability, communication, conflict resolution, equality of the roles, children and marital life, family and friends, financial management, leisure activities, religious orientation, idealistic distortions. This inventory requires an elaborate preparation in order to be used and results from the combination of three previous scales: PREPARE - Premarital Personal and Relationship Evaluation (for couples planning to marry who do not have children); PREPARE-MC - Marriage Children (for couples planning to marry who have children, either together or from previous relationships); ENRICH - Evaluating Nurturing Relationship Issues Communication and Happiness (for married couples seeking empowerment and counselling).

=== SAI (Sexual Arousability Inventory) ===
- SAI - Sexual Arousability Inventory

A 28-item questionnaire that psychometrically evaluates the level of arousability produced by sexual experiences, whereas SAI-E Sexual Arousability Inventory Expanded measures anxiety and arousability and it is meant for men and women regardless their psychosexual orientation.

=== SAS (Sexual Attitude Scale) ===
- SAS - Sexual Attitude Scale

A 25-item scale aiming at identifying subjects' attitude (liberal or conservative) towards different forms of sexuality. This questionnaire is not meant to study sexual disturbances, it just explores the subjects' attitude towards sexuality and its numerous expressions.

=== SBI (Sexual Behavior Inventory) ===
- SBI - Sexual Behavior Inventory (Males, Females)

A self-evaluation scale in two versions (male and female version). Both versions are made up of 21 items. The questionnaire evaluates the kind of involvement of subjects in heterosexual activities.

=== SESAMO_Win (Sexrelation Evaluation Schedule Assessment Monitoring on Windows) ===
- SESAMO_Win - Sexrelation Evaluation Schedule Assessment Monitoring on Windows

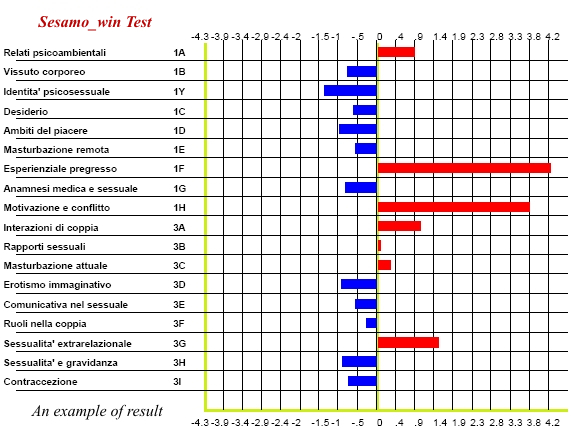
SESAMO Sexrelational Test diagram's example

A standardised and validated self-administering and self-evaluation questionnaire. It studies the dysfunctional aspects in individual and couple sexuality besides family, social, affective and relational aspects. It consists of two questionnaires (i.e. a male and a female questionnaire) which are divided in two subsections each: one for singles and one for people with a partner. The number of items in each questionnaire is variable: 135 items for singles and 173 for people with a partner. The explored dimensions are 16 for singles and 18 for people living a dyadic situation. This questionnaire can be directly self-administered on the computer (self-assessment); after that the software elaborates the questionnaire and produces a report made up of nine sections. Each of these sections has several levels of further diagnostic analysis. A short version of this questionnaire, called Sexuality Evaluation Schedule Assessment Monitoring, has a lower number of items and can be administered only through the paper and pencil method. The disadvantages of this evaluation/research tool are the time required for filling in the questionnaire and the fact that the complete Report can be elaborated only by the software.

=== SESII–W (Sexual Excitation/Sexual Inhibition Inventory for Women) ===
- SESII–W - Sexual Excitation/Sexual Inhibition Inventory for Women

This test investigates sexual arousal and inhibition in women through a 115-item questionnaire rated on a 4-point Likert scale.
The areas concerning sexual arousal are: Arousability (arousal and sexual stimulation); Sexual power dynamics (power dynamics in sexuality); Smell (arousing smells); Partner characteristics; Setting (unusual or unconcealed settings).
Sexual inhibition factors are: Relationship importance; Arousal contingency (arousal-related factors); Concerns about sexual function (concerns about the consequences of sexual activity).
This test is based on the conditioning of sexual response: sexual arousal is controlled by the balance of several factors, all of which contribute to arousal or inhibition.
Validation of this test is based on a sample of 655 women with an average age of 33.09. Statistical calculations have provided a good reliability measured by test-retest method and good discriminant and convergent validity determined through the consistency of the results obtained by this test with those obtained by BIS/BAS - Behavioral Inhibition Scale/Behavioral Activation Scale, SOS – Sexual Opinion Survey and SSS – Sexual Sensation Seeking.

=== SFQ (Sexual Functioning Questionnaire) ===
- SFQ - Sexual Functioning Questionnaire

A standardised questionnaire which studies sexual impotence problems. It is made up of 62 items (48 of them are meant for both partners while 14 are meant exclusively for the dysfunctional patient). The scoring and the clinical evaluation must have done with the traditional method.

=== SHQ–R (Clarke Sex History Questionnaire for Males–Revised) ===
- SHQ–R - Clarke Sex History Questionnaire for Males–Revised

Clarke Sex History Questionnaire for Males was created in 1977 by some clinicians from the Centre for Addiction and Mental Health (the former Clarke Institute of Psychiatry) in Toronto (Canada).
SHQ-R is a fully validated and standardised self-report questionnaire, revised in 2002. It is composed of 508 items exploring several areas of male sexuality:
I. Childhood and Adolescent Sexual Experiences (a scale to measure sexual experiences and sexual abuse during childhood and adolescence);
II. Sexual Dysfunction (a scale which evaluates sexual dysfunctions such as impotence, hypersexuality and premature or retarded ejaculation);
III. Adult Age/Gender Sexual Outlets (seven scales measuring the frequency of various sexual activities with adults, children and adolescents);
IV. Fantasy and Pornography (three scales measuring sexual fantasies involving women, men and the use of pornography);
V. Transvestism, Fetishism, and Feminine Gender Identity (three scales which evaluate personal experiences with regard to transvestism, sexual fetishes and identification with female gender traits);
VI. Courtship Disorders (six scales which take into consideration several aspects of "disturbed courtship": voyeurism, exhibitionism, obscene telephone calls, frotteurism/toucherism and sexual assault).
This test also includes two validity indicators: a "Lie scale" (insincere answers) and an "Infrequency scale" (infrequent answers).

=== SII (Sexual Interaction Inventory) ===
- SII - Sexual Interaction Inventory

A standardised self-evaluation questionnaire made up of 17 items with 6 answers each. It gathers information about sexual interactions within heterosexual or homosexual couples. The result is obtained through a cross evaluation of the answers both partners have separately given in their respective questionnaires. Manual scoring of rough points, which are then converted into percentages to be used to create a diagram which shows a sexual interaction profile for each couple.

=== SOC (Spouse Observation Checklist) ===
- SOC - Spouse Observation Checklist

A 400-item checklist relating partner's behaviours to be filled in by husband and wife for two weeks. It takes into account 12 behavioural categories: love, solidarity, consideration, sexuality, communication, couple's activities, children's care, home management, decisions about financial matters, job, personal habits and independence of both partners. It is similar to MAP - Marital Agendas Protocol in many aspects. This type of daily diaries are chiefly used in marriage counselling in order to evaluate conflict management and couple satisfaction/dissatisfaction.

=== SOS (Sexual Opinion Survey) ===
- SOS - Sexual Opinion Survey

A 21-item scale which explores subjects' attitude towards several sexual aspects: heterosexuality, homosexuality, erotic fantasies, sexual stimuli, etc.

=== TIPE (Test di Induzione Psico Erotica) ===
- TIPE – Test di Induzione Psico Erotica

The Psycho Erotic Induction Test is a projective test, standardised for evaluating erotic imagery. It is made up of eight tables concerning four specific issues: situations during childhood, initiative in love relationships, competitiveness and function of the group.

=== WIQ (Waring Intimacy Questionnaire) ===
- WIQ - Waring Intimacy Questionnaire

This scale is made up of 90 items analysing nine aspects relating couple's intimacy: sexuality, love, expressiveness, marital cohesion, couple compatibility, partners' independence, conflicts, social identity and desirability bias. This scale seems to be reliable and free from sexual preconceptions although plethoric in conceptualising some of the items.

== See also ==
- Clitoral photoplethysmograph
- Labial thermistor clip
- Penile plethysmograph
- Vaginal photoplethysmograph
