= Penrig =

The penrig is a unit of tumescence, specifically for the tumescence of the human penis. It is defined as the tumescence that will raise 100 grams of penile tissue through one millimetre. The word is formed from PENis RIGidity.
