= Postage stamp test =

Test used to evaluate nocturnal erections in a workup of male impotence

The postage stamp test is a test used to evaluate nocturnal erections in a workup of male impotence. A length of connected postage stamps connected by perforations that allow easy tearing are secured loosely around the male's flaccid penis just prior to sleeping. If the perforated connections between the individual stamps are torn upon awakening, this is taken as evidence of nocturnal tumescence. However, there is also a chance that the male may shift his position in bed in such a way as to unknowingly tear the perforated connections between the stamps without having achieved a nocturnal erection, thus causing a false positive.
