= Prostatic plexus =

Prostatic plexus may refer to:

- Prostatic plexus (nervous)
- Prostatic venous plexus
