= Tumescence =

Normal engorgement with blood of the erectile tissues

Tumescence is the quality or state of being tumescent or swollen. Tumescence usually refers to the normal engorgement with blood (vascular congestion) of the erectile tissues, marking sexual excitation, and possible readiness for sexual activity. The tumescent sexual organ in males is the penis and in females is the clitoris and other parts of the genitalia like the vestibular bulbs. Arteries in the penis dilate to increase blood volume.

Detumescence is the reversal of this process, by which blood leaves the erectile tissue, returning the erectile tissue to the flaccid state.

Something that causes an erection is sometimes referred to as a tumefier (tumefyer) or tumescer.

== See also ==
- Clitoral erection
- Erection
- Hard flaccid syndrome
- Intumescent, a substance that swells up when heated
- Priapism
- Nocturnal clitoral tumescence
- Nocturnal emission
- Nocturnal penile tumescence
- Sexual swelling
- Sleep sex
- Swelling (medical)
