= Idiographic image =

In the field of clinical human sciences, an idiographic image is the representation of a result which has been obtained thanks to a study or research method whose subject-matters are specific cases, i.e. a portrayal which avoids nomothetic generalizations.

Diagnostic formulation follows an idiographic criterion, while diagnostic classification follows a nomothetic criterion.

In the field of psychiatry, psychology and clinical psychopathology, idiographic criterion is a method (also called historical method) which involves evaluating past experiences and selecting and comparing information about a specific individual or event. An example of idiographic image is a report, diagram or health history showing medical, psychological and pathological features which make the subject under examination unique.

Where there is no prior detailed presentation of clinical data, the summary should present sufficient relevant information to support the diagnostic and aetiological components of the formulation. The term diagnostic formulation is preferable to diagnosis, because it emphasises that matters of clinical concern about which the clinician proposes aetiological hypotheses and targets of intervention include much more than just diagnostic category assignment, though this is usually an important component.

The expression idiographic image appeared for the first time in 1996 in the SESAMO research method manual.

This term was coined to mean that the report of the test provided an anamnestic report containing a family, relational and health history of the subject and providing semiological data regarding both the psychosexual and the social-affective profile. These profiles were useful to the clinician in order to formulate pathogenetic and pathognomonic hypotheses.

== See also ==
- Nomothetic and idiographic
- Sexological testing
