= Cavernous nerves =

Cavernous nerves of clitoris

Details
- From: Uterovaginal plexus

Identifiers
- Latin: nervi cavernosi clitoridis

Cavernous nerves of penis

Details
- From: Prostatic plexus

Identifiers
- Latin: nervi cavernosi penis

The cavernous nerves are post-ganglionic parasympathetic nerves that facilitate penile erection and clitoral erection. They arise from cell bodies in the inferior hypogastric plexus where they receive the pre-ganglionic pelvic splanchnic nerves (S2-S4).

In the penis, there are both lesser cavernous nerves and a greater cavernous nerve.

== Clinical considerations ==
These nerves are susceptible to injury following prostatectomy or genital surgery.

Nerve-sparing prostatectomy was invented for surgeons to avoid injuring the nerves and causing erectile dysfunction complications. During surgery, a doctor may apply a small electrical stimulation to the nerve and measure the erectile function with a penile plethysmograph. This test aids the surgeon in identifying the nerves, which are difficult to see.
