= Nerve-sparing surgery =

Surgery that attempts not to damage nerves

Nerve-sparing surgery is a type of surgery that attempts to save the nerves near the tissues being removed.

It is commonly applied in radical retropubic prostatectomy, a surgical treatment for prostate cancer, in which damage to nerves during surgery can lead to complications including urinary incontinence and impotence. In nerve-sparing radical prostatectomy, initially developed by Dr. Patrick Walsh in the 1980s, surgeons identify and attempt to avoid damaging the nerves. Surgeons may visually identify the cavernous nerves of penis or apply an electrical stimulation penile plethysmograph diagnostic test to verify the nerves, and so avoid damaging them. The bilateral approach attempts to spare the nerves on both sides of the prostate. The unilateral approach is specific to one side, usually because the prostate cancer has spread to prevent a bilateral nerve-sparing approach; studies suggest that this approach leads to better results than non-nerve-sparing surgery, but that patient age and previous erectile function have a significant influence on post-operative results.
