= SESAMO =

SESAMO is the acronym of Sexrelation Evaluation Schedule Assessment Monitoring, is an Italian psychometric and psychological standardised and validated questionnaire (see Tab. 1) to examine single and couple aspect life, sexuality, interpersonal and intimate relationship.

== Features ==
As many others sexological tests, a female and a male version are available and both are made up of three sections (see Tab. 2):

- the first section contains items which investigate those areas relating to previous sexuality aspects; the subjects' social, environmental and personal features, health history and their BMI (Body Mass Index). After filling in this first section, all the subjects will be sent to either the second or third subsection depending on their affective-relational condition, which is defined as single condition or couple condition respectively.
- The second section collects all those items whose research areas relate to present sexuality and motivational aspects. This section is intended for single people, i.e. people lacking a stable sexual-affective relationship with a partner.
- The third section includes those areas which investigate the subjects' present sexuality and relational aspects within the couple. This section is intended for the dyadic condition, i. e. a sexual-affective relationship which is going on for at least six months.

== Contents ==
The two versions (male/female) and their subsection (single/couple) of the questionnaire, contain 135 items for male and female single people, and 173 for males and females with a partner respectively. This method allows to detect dysfunctional sexual and relational aspects in singles people and people with a partner, aiming at two main goals:

- defining a psychosexual and social-affective profile as an "idiographic image" of the subject;
- putting forward hypotheses about the dysfunctional aspects in individual and couple sexuality and their causes.

== Tab.1 – Cronbach' Alpha ==
Cronbach' Alpha SESAMO questionnaire
α	Male	Female
Single condition	0.710	0.696
Couple condition	0.771	0.700

== Assessment ==
The assessment essentially aims at those areas concerning previous and present sexuality and, at the same time, it takes into consideration all those elements that, even indirectly, could have affected the development, expression and display of personality, affectivity and relationality (interpersonal and intimate relationships).
The questionnaire takes into consideration the following areas (as shown on Tab. 2):
social environmental data, psychosexual identity, sphere of pleasure (sex play, paraphilias), previous and present masturbation, previous sexual experiences, affective-relational condition, sexual intercourse, imaginative eroticism, contraception, relational attitude; additional areas are intended only for subjects with a partner: couple interaction, communicativeness within the sexual sphere, roles within the couple and extrarelational sexuality (i.e. outside couple sexuality).

== Tab.2 – Domains of the questionnaire ==
Domains SESAMO questionnaire
Section 1	Section 2	Section 3
General part	Single condition	Couple condition
Social environmental data	Single situation	Couple interaction
Body image	Pleasure	Sexual intercourses
Psychosexual identity	Sexual intercourses	Present masturbation
Desire	Present masturbation	Imaginative eroticism
Sphere of pleasure (paraphilias)	Imaginative eroticism	Communicativeness sexual sphere
Previous masturbation	Contraception	Roles within the couple
Previous sexual experiences	Relational attitude	Extrarelational sexuality
Medical anamnesis	—	Sexuality and pregnancy
Motivation and conflicts	—	Contraception
Total domains	Single condition = 16 domains	Couple condition = 18 domains

== Methodology ==
The SESAMO_Win methodology is provided with a software for administering the questionnaire and creating a multifactorial multilevel evaluation Report. This software analyses and decodes the answers obtained through direct administration on the computer or entered into the computer from printed forms and produces an anamnestic report about the subjects' sexual and relational condition. Once the administration has been completed, the software does not allow the questionnaire and its respective report to be altered or manipulated. This is necessary for deontological reasons and, above all, to assure its validity in legal appraisals and screenings. The software processes a report for each questionnaire. Each report can be displayed on the computer monitor or printed out. It is also possible to print out the whole report or its single parts.

== Anamnestic report ==
The report is divided in 9 parts:

- 1. Heading

It contains the subject's identification data and some directions for using the information in the report properly (interpretations, inferences and indications provided by the report).

- 2. Personal data and household

It displays a summary of personal data, BMI (Body mass index), the starting and finishing time of the administration, the time required to fill in the questionnaire, the composition of the household, the present affective-relational condition and off-the-cuff comments from the subject at the end of the administration.

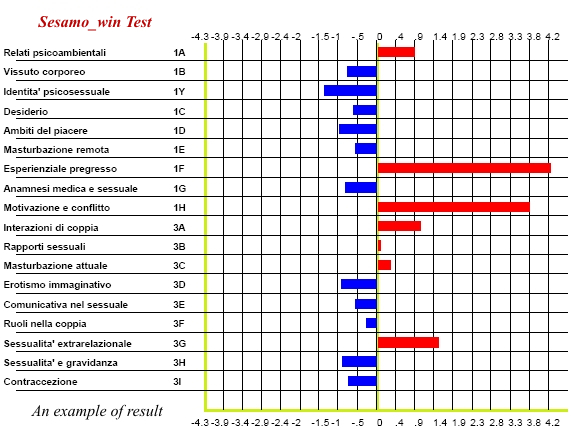
SESAMO Sexrelational Test diagram's example

- 3. Scoring diagram for each area

A diagram displays a comparative summary of the scores obtained by the subject in each area of analysis (it could be defined as a snapshot of the subject's sexual-relational condition). The right side of the diagram (displaying positive scores) indicates an hypothesis about the degree of discomfort/dysfunction for each area.

- 4. Critical traits

The critical traits section highlights the most relevant and significant features of the subject's condition and his/her sexual-relational fields. These indications allow to get some relevant hints to be used in prospective in-depth medical, psychological, psychiatric interviews.

- 5. Narrative report

It tells in a narrative and detailed way the subject's sexual-relational history, through the explanations and comments he/she made while completing the questionnaire.

- 6. Further diagnostic examinations and specialist examinations

It gives some brief indications about those focal points which need to be addressed and carefully considered, besides it suggests prospective specialist examinations and counselling.

- 7. Parameters for the items and subliminal indexes

This section of the report displays, as well as the topic relative to each question, the indexes of subliminal factors measured on the subject and the significance degree of the answers he/she has chosen for each item.

- Go-back index (it shows that the subject went back to previous items due to rethinking/rumination);
- Try-jump index (it reveals an attempt to jump or leave out the answer to an item);
- Significance index (or weight) of the answers chosen by the subject for each item;
- Latency time index for each item (measured for each answer);
- Kinetic reaction index of the subject (emotional motility measured for each item).

- 8. The score for each area displays:

- a descriptive heading of the fields of investigation relative to the subject's affective-relational condition (single or couple);
- the number of the omitted answers for each area (this option is activated only when entering the answers into the computer from a paper questionnaire);
- the rough points obtained by the subject for each area;
- the Z scores (standard scores) for each area and their relative percentile ranks.

- 9. Completed questionnaire

This section displays all the answers chosen and entered into the computer by the subject while completing the questionnaire; as well as being a documental report (official certificate), it can be used in personalised close examinations and to obtain the open answers entered through the keyboard by the subject.

== Criticism ==
The disadvantages of this device are the time required for filling in the questionnaire (30–60 minutes) and the fact that the complete report can be elaborated only by the software. A reduced version of the questionnaire has less items but can be administered and scored through the paper and pencil method.

A clinical research that has used the brief version, expresses this:

"During follow-up each patient received the SESAMO test (Sexuality Evaluation Schedule Assessment Monitoring) in the standard clinical form, with the end point of tracking down the sexual, affective, and relationship profile of each Htx pts [...]. The SESAMO questionnaire is based on topics relative to male and female sexuality in mates situation. Topics are grouped in two section: the first one collects data on former sexuality, health history, and social behavior; the second one looks at the mate's relationship to show any situation revealing sexual worries. The questionnaire gives values based on a survey of 648 people with characteristics quite similar to the Italian population. The clinical test for mates is based on 81 items for males and 85 items for females. The row score for each topic is modified in standard scores. The exceeding of scores over a specified threshold gives concise information for diagnostic purpose".

== Bibliography ==
- Basile Fasolo C., Veglia F., Disturbi sessuali, in Conti L. (1999), Repertorio delle scale di valutazione in psichiatria, S.E.E. Edizioni Medico Scientifiche, Firenze. © 2005 POL.it: LE SCALE DI VALUTAZIONE IN PSICHIATRIA.
- Boccadoro L., Carulli S., (2009) Il posto dell'amore negato. Sessualità e psicopatologie segrete (The place of the denied love. Sexuality and secret psychopathologies). Tecnoprint Editrice, Ancona. ISBN 978-88-95554-03-7
- Boccadoro L., (2002) Sesamo_win: Sexrelation Evaluation Schedule Assessment Monitoring, Giunti O.S., Florence (Italy). it:SESAMO (test)
- Boccadoro L., (1996) SESAMO: Sexuality Evaluation Schedule Assessment Monitoring, Approccio differenziale al profilo idiografico psicosessuale e socioaffettivo, Organizzazioni Speciali, Firenze. IT\ICCU\CFI\0327719 Giunti Psychometrics - Test e Strumenti Psicodiagnostici | Giunti Psychometrics
- Brunetti M., Olivetti Belardinelli M. et al., Hypothalamus, sexual arousal and psychosexual identity in human males: a functional magnetic resonance imaging study. European Journal of Neuroscience, Vol. 27, 11, 2008.
- Calabrò R.S., Bramantia P. et al., Topiramate-induced erectile dysfunction. Epilepsy & Behavior, 14, 3, 2009.
- Capodieci S. et al., (1999) SESAMO: una nuova metodica per l'assessment sessuorelazionale. In: Cociglio G., et al. (a cura di), La coppia, Franco Angeli, Milano. ISBN 88-464-1491-8
- Dessì A., Conte S., Men as well have problems with their body image and with sex. A study on men suffering from eating disorders. Sexologies, 17, 1, 2008.
- Dèttore D., (2001) Psicologia e psicopatologia del comportamento sessuale, McGraw-Hill, Milano. ISBN 88-386-2747-9
- Ferretti A., Caulo M., Del Gratta C. et al., Dynamics of Male Sexual Arousal: Distinct Components of Brain Activation Revealed by fMRI. Neuroimage, 26, 4, 2005.
- Natale V., Albertazzi P., Zini M., Di Micco R., Exploration of cyclical changes in memory and mood in postmenopausal women taking sequential combined oestrogen and progestogen preparations. British Journal of Obstetrics and Gynaecology. Vol. 108, 286-290, 2001.
- Ugolini V., Baldassarri F., Valutazione della vita sessuorelazionale in uomini affetti da sterilità attraverso il SESAMO. In Rivista di Sessuologia, vol.25, n.4, 2001.
- Vignati R. et al., Un nuovo test per l’indagine sessuale. In Journal of Sexological Sciences - Rivista Scienze Sessuologiche, Vol.11 n.3, 1998.
- Vignati R. La valutazione del disagio nell’approccio ai disturbi sessuorelazionali in PSYCHOMEDIA, 2010.
