= The Principles of Pleasure =

- Genre: Docu-series
- Directed by: Niharika Desai
- Starring: Supriya Ganesh; Gina Nicole Brown; Michelle Buteau
- Country of origin: United States
- Original language: English
- No. of seasons: 1
- No. of episodes: 3

Production
- Running time: 48–55 min
- Production company: The Front

Original release
- Network: Netflix
- Release: March 22, 2022

The Principles of Pleasure is a 2022 Netflix docuseries that examines the world of female, transgender, and non-binary sexual pleasure, and its surrounding lack of understanding in modern science. The series consists of three episodes and premiered on Netflix on March 22, 2022. The series is directed by Niharika Desai and is narrated by actress Michelle Buteau.

== Synopsis ==
The series seeks to empower and educate viewers about the female body and female pleasure. Topics discussed in the series range from the history of sex education, the orgasm gap, gender roles in the media and society, the lack of research about women's sexuality dating back centuries, and consent.

Interviewees include Emily Nagoski, author of the book Come as You Are.

== Episodes ==
No.	Title	Directed by	Original release date
1	"Our Bodies"	Niharika Desai	March 22, 2022
2	"Our Minds"	Niharika Desai	March 22, 2022
3	"Our Relationships"	Niharika Desai	March 22, 2022

== Reception ==
The Principles of Pleasure has received positive reviews from critics who lauded the series for emphasizing "that women of color, trans women, fat women, and women with disabilities in particular [generally] get excluded from the dialogue, and most sex educators are white, cisgender, and able-bodied. This isn’t a one-time acknowledgment in the docuseries. Instead, the project consistently wrestles with, to paraphrase one interviewee, how the world relates to our bodies and how that impacts our ability to be sexual. It is a through-line."

Beth Ashley of The Guardian pointed out, "Part of the show’s importance is in highlighting how far behind even the science on the subject is...Psychologist Dr Lori Brotto and sexual psychophysiologist Dr Nicole Prause explain how many research proposals – including Prause’s own – which could uncover a lot of missing information about female orgasms, ejaculation, arousal and dysfunction have been rejected due to male discomfort in the science community." Ashley commended the show for its handling of the topic of consent, and said "It is refreshing to see [female pleasure] discussed so openly on screen."
