= Nocturnal emission =

Spontaneous sleep orgasm

A nocturnal emission or sleep orgasm is a spontaneous occurrence during sleep of ejaculation and orgasm for a male, and vaginal lubrication and/or orgasm for a female. This occurrence is often produced by sexual arousal during a dream, which is often known as a wet dream or a sex dream.

== Context ==
Nocturnal emissions can happen after dreams in REM sleep, including sex dreams, which activate the sympathetic nervous system, leading to ejaculation.

Nocturnal emissions can start as early as age ten, and are most common during adolescence and early young adult years, but they may happen any time after puberty. Men can wake up during a wet dream, or sleep through it, but for women, few researchers believe that women should awaken during the orgasm, and perceive that the female should have an orgasm for it to count as a wet dream. Vaginal lubrication alone does not mean that the woman has had an orgasm.

== Composition ==
Owing to the difficulty in collecting ejaculate produced during nocturnal emissions, relatively few studies have examined its composition.

In the largest study, which included nocturnal emission samples from 10 men with idiopathic anejaculation, the semen concentration was equivalent to samples obtained from the same men by penile vibratory stimulation, although the proportions of sperm that were motile, and that were of normal morphology, were higher in the nocturnal emission specimens.

== Frequency ==
In a detailed study, men and women reported that roughly 8% of their everyday dreams contain some form of sexual-related activity. Four percent of sex dreams among both men and women resulted in orgasms.

=== In males ===
The frequency of nocturnal emissions is highly variable. While general population surveys focus on lifelong averages, personal tracking records show that when a person suddenly stops all masturbation or sexual activity, it often triggers a delayed reaction. After a few weeks of total abstinence, involuntary wet dreams typically spike in frequency before settling into a new, higher baseline as the body adapts. Some males have experienced large numbers of nocturnal emissions as teenagers, while others have never experienced any. In the U.S., 83% of men experience nocturnal emissions at some time.

For males who have experienced nocturnal emissions, the mean frequency ranges from 0.36 times per week (about once every three weeks) for single 15-year-old males to 0.18 times per week (about once every six weeks) for 40-year-old single males. For married males, the mean ranges from 0.23 times per week (about once per month) for 19-year-old married males to 0.15 times per week (about once every two months) for 50-year-old married males.

In Indonesia, surveys have shown that 93% of men experience nocturnal emissions by the age of 24.

Some males have the emissions only at a specific age, while others have them throughout their lives following puberty. The frequency with which one has nocturnal emissions has not been conclusively linked to the frequency of masturbation. Alfred Kinsey found:

"...some correlation between the frequencies of masturbation and the frequencies of nocturnal emissions. In general, the males who have the highest frequencies of nocturnal emissions may have somewhat lower rates of masturbation. [...] On the other hand, there is little evidence that high frequencies of masturbation reduce the frequencies of nocturnal emissions."

Kinsey’s conclusion that masturbation does not reduce the frequency of wet dreams comes from looking at large groups of different people at a point in time. However, this broad approach can hide what happens to a single individual over time.

Detailed day-by-day diaries from the 1850s published by historian B.R. Burg show a direct link in a single person's body. In 1853, when the diarist masturbated regularly, he experienced 24 wet dreams. In 1855, after he chose to practice absolute celibacy and stopped masturbating entirely, his involuntary wet dreams nearly doubled to 42. Strikingly, his total number of sexual releases remained exactly identical at 42 events across both years. This suggests that while large population statistics can blur the pattern, an individual's body can maintain a biological balance, replacing voluntary releases with involuntary ones.Burg, B. R. (1988). "Nocturnal Emission and Masturbatory Frequency Relationships: A 19th-Century Account." ''The Journal of Sex Research'', 24(1), 302–311.

One factor that can affect the number of nocturnal emissions males have is whether they take testosterone-based drugs. In a 1998 study by Finkelstein et al, the number of boys reporting nocturnal emissions drastically increased as their testosterone doses were increased, from 17% of subjects with no treatment to 90% of subjects at a high dose.

Thirteen percent of males experience their first ejaculation as a result of a nocturnal emission. Kinsey found that males experiencing their first ejaculation through a nocturnal emission were older than those experiencing their first ejaculation by means of masturbation. The study indicates that such a first ejaculation resulting from a nocturnal emission was delayed a year or more from what would have been developmentally possible for such males through physical stimulation.

=== In females ===
In 1953, sex researcher Alfred Kinsey found that nearly 40% of the women he interviewed had had one or more nocturnal orgasms or wet dreams. Those who reported experiencing these said that they usually had them several times a year and that they first occurred as early as thirteen, and usually by the age of 21. Kinsey defined female nocturnal orgasm as sexual arousal during sleep that awakens one to perceive the experience of orgasm.

Research published by Barbara L. Wells in the 1986 Journal of Sex Research indicates that as many as 85% of women have experienced nocturnal orgasm by the age of 21. This research was based on women waking up with or during orgasm.

Studies have found that males typically have more frequent spontaneous nocturnal sexual experiences than females. However, female wet dreams may also be more difficult to identify with certainty than male wet dreams because ejaculation is usually associated with male orgasm while vaginal lubrication may not indicate orgasm.

== Cultural views ==
Numerous cultural and religious views have been advanced related to nocturnal emissions. Below is a limited summary of some perspectives.

=== Jewish and Samaritan ===
Some examples of passages under the Mosaic law of the Hebrew Bible teach that under the law of Moses, a man who had a nocturnal emission incurred ritual defilement (as with any other instance of ejaculation):

"If a man has an emission of semen, he shall bathe his whole body in water and be unclean [Hebrew tameh] until the evening. And every garment and every skin on which the semen comes shall be washed with water and be unclean until the evening."

— Leviticus

"When you are encamped against your enemies, then you shall keep yourself from every evil thing. If any man among you becomes unclean [Hebrew lo yihyeh tahor, literally 'will not be clean'] because of a nocturnal emission [literally: 'by reason of what happens to him by night'], then he shall go outside the camp. He shall not come inside the camp, but when evening comes, he shall bathe himself in water, and as the sun sets, he may come inside the camp."

— Deuteronomy

The first of these is part of a passage stating similar regulations about sexual intercourse and menstruation. Leviticus 12 makes similar regulations about childbirth.

A third passage relates more specifically to priests, requiring any "of the offspring of Aaron who has ... a discharge", among other causes of ritual defilement, to abstain from eating holy offerings until after a ritual immersion in a mikveh and until the subsequent night-fall.

In Judaism, the Tikkun HaKlali, also known as "The General Remedy", is a set of ten Psalms designed in 1805 by Rebbe Nachman, whose recital is intended to serve as repentance for nocturnal emissions.

=== Patristic Christian ===
Saint Augustine held that male nocturnal emissions, unlike masturbation, did not pollute the conscience of a man, because they were not voluntary carnal acts, and were therefore not to be considered a sin.

A similar view was expressed by Thomas Aquinas, who wrote in the Summa Theologica II-II-154-5:

"For there is no one who while sleeping does not regard some of the images formed by his imagination as though they were real, as stated above... ...Wherefore what a man does while he sleeps and is deprived of reason's judgment, is not imputed to him as a sin, as neither are the actions of a maniac or an imbecile."

=== Indian traditions ===
The Hindu text suggests those who had nocturnal emissions to bathe and chant mantras praying to return their virility.

For Buddhist monks, masturbation is against the Vinaya, but a nocturnal emission is not. After the second Buddhist council, a schism has occurred for some reasons; among them, it is traditionally reported that there was a disagreement on whether an Arhat could have wet dreams and what could cause such nocturnal emissions in them.

=== East Asia ===
Traditional East Asian medicine considered it problematic because it was considered to be an act of evil spirits that tried to rob the life of a person. The literature suggests a "cure" for nocturnal emissions, which prescribes fried leek seeds three times a day.

== See also ==
- Spermarche
- Nocturnal clitoral tumescence
- Nocturnal enuresis
- Nocturnal penile tumescence
- Sleep sex
- Somnophilia

== Bibliography ==
- Kinsey, Alfred C.; Wardell B. Pomeroy; Clyde E. Martin (1948). Sexual Behavior in the Human Male. Philadelphia: W. B. Saunders Co.
