= Emily Nagoski =

American sex educator and researcher

- Born: 1977 (age 48–49)
- Education: Indiana University Bloomington
- Occupations: Sex educator, author, professor
- Organization: Smith College
- Notable work: Come as You Are: The Surprising New Science That Will Change Your Sex Life, Burnout: The Secret to Unlocking the Stress Cycle, Come Together: The Science (and Art!) of Creating Lasting Sexual Connections
- Relatives: Amelia Nagoski (sister), Steph Nagoski (sister)
- Scientific career
- Thesis: An Agent Based Model of Disease Diffusion in the Context of Heterogeneous Sexual Motivation (2006)
- Doctoral advisor: David Lohrmann, Erick Janssen
- Website: https://www.emilynagoski.com

Emily Nagoski (born 1977) is an American sex educator and researcher, and author of books including New York Times bestseller, Come as You Are. She is the former director of wellness education at Smith College, where she taught a course on women's sexuality.

== Early life and education ==
Emily Nagoski earned a PhD in Health Behavior with a minor in Human Sexuality from the Indiana University School of Public Health and a master's degree in counseling from Indiana University. She has worked as a researcher at The Kinsey Institute.

== Career ==
For eight years, she was the director of wellness education at Smith College. In 2016, after the success of her first book, she became a full-time writer and public speaker. In addition, she operates a podcast and a newsletter, and on social media sometimes features a puppet named Nagoggles.

=== Come as You Are ===
Come as You Are: The Surprising New Science that Will Transform Your Sex Life was published in 2015. The book discusses the difference between "spontaneous" and "responsive" sexual desire. Although Nagoski has been widely cited as estimating that only around 15% of women experience spontaneous desire, she has stated in the updated 2021 edition of Come As You Are that she is "yet to find useful statistics about who has which desire style". She also discusses "arousal non-concordance", estimating, based on experiments of responsiveness to sexual stimuli, that there is a roughly 50% overlap between what stimuli men consider "sex-related" and "sexually appealing", compared with only 10% for women. The book popularized the metaphor of a car accelerator and brakes, representing reasoning to engage and avoid sex, respectively. There are times for both, and it is advised to know when to choose one or the other. It argued that when women lack sexual desire, the reason is not always a lack of "acceleration" but instead too many brakes. The Guardian praised the "lightness of Nagoski's tone combined with the book's happy, of-course-you're-normal message."

=== Writing and speaking career ===
==== Burnout ====
In 2019, Nagoski and her twin Amelia – who has a DMA in conducting from the University of Connecticut and is assistant professor and coordinator of music at Western New England University, presenting educational sessions discussing application of communications science and psychological research for audiences of other professional musicians, including Beyond Burnout Prevention: Embodied Wellness for Conductors – co-wrote the book Burnout: The Secret to Solving the Stress Cycle / Burnout: The Secret to Unlocking the Stress Cycle (2020) / Burnout: Solve Your Stress Cycle (2020), on the causes and management of stress, including structural factors that particularly affect women. They contrast the relatively short-term dynamics of stress in evolutionary times with modern-day stressors that often go unresolved, and discuss forms of affection and physical activity that help complete what they call the "stress cycle".

==== Come Together ====
Come Together: The Science (and Art!) of Creating Lasting Sexual Connections was published in 2024. It was inspired by dry spells in her own marriage, and it was the first time she publicly discussed her own sex life. The New York Times called it "the product of an academic who loves data." In the book, Nagoski stresses that the priority of sex should be pleasure, not frequency, orgasm count, or novelty.

==== The Principles of Pleasure ====
She appeared in The Principles of Pleasure, a Netflix docuseries about sex.

== Personal life ==
Nagoski is married to Rich Stevens, a cartoonist, whom she met on the dating site OkCupid in 2011. They have two rescue dogs.

She was diagnosed with autism in 2021. She suffered from long COVID, attesting, “I couldn’t walk to the end of my driveway to get my mail without debilitating pain and fatigue…The disabling experience of long COVID has been such a force.”

== Web links ==
- emilynagoski.com
- TED Speaker / TED Attendee: Emily Nagoski, Sex educator, on ted.com
