= Vaginal photoplethysmograph =

Technique using light to measure the amount of blood in the walls of the vagina

Vaginal photoplethysmography (VPG, VPP) is a technique using light to measure the amount of blood in the walls of the vagina. The device that is used is called a vaginal photometer.

== Use ==
The device is used to try to obtain an objective measure of a woman's sexual arousal. There is an overall poor correlation (r = 0.26) between women's self-reported levels of desire and their VPG readings.

== Instrument ==
The instrument used in the procedure is called vaginal photometer. The device has a clear shell, inside of which is a light source and a photocell, which senses reflected light. The use of the device is done with the assumption that the more light that is scattered back, and that the photocell senses, the more blood is in the walls of the vagina.

The output of the VPG can be filtered into two types of signals, which have different properties. The direct current signal is a measure of vaginal blood volume (VBV) and reflects the total blood volume in the vaginal tissues. The alternating current signal is a measure of vaginal pulse amplitude (VPA) and reflects the pressure change within the blood vessels of the vaginal wall associated with each heartbeat. While changes in VBV occur in response to sexual and anxiety-inducing stimuli, changes in VPA only occur in response to sexual stimuli.

VPA is defined as the peak-to-trough amplitude of the vaginal pulse wave. It is calculated by subtracting the means of all troughs from the means of all peaks experienced during stimulus presentation. VPA lacks an absolute scale of measurement; each unit of change (mV) does not correspond directly with a physiological change. Since VPA does not have a standard unit of measurement, it is difficult for researchers to make between-participant comparisons.

== History ==
VPG was first introduced in the 1960s by Palti and Bercovici, who affixed a light source and photosensitive cell onto a gynecological speculum and recorded vaginal pulse waves. Sintchak and Geer improved on the device in the 1970s by using a vaginal probe which became the common instrument to measure vaginal blood flow.

== See also ==
- Clitoral photoplethysmography
- Labial thermistor clip
- Penile plethysmography
