= Prostatic plexus (nervous) =

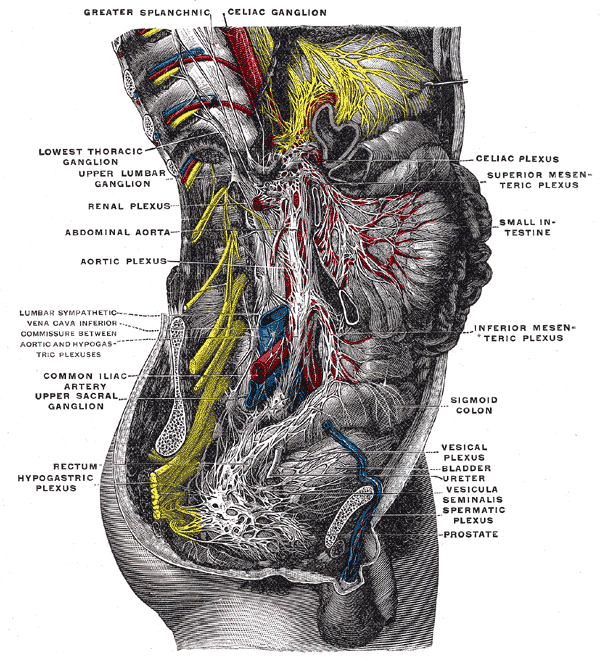
- Lower half of right sympathetic cord. (Prostatic plexus visible but not labeled. Prostate labeled at lower right.)

Details

Identifiers
- Latin: plexus prostaticus
- TA98: A14.3.03.052M
- TA2: 6724
- FMA: 6647

The prostatic plexus is continued from the lower part of the pelvic plexus. It lies within the fascial shell of the prostate.

The nerves composing it are of large size.

They are distributed to the prostate seminal vesicle and the corpora cavernosa of the penis and urethra.

The nerves supplying the corpora cavernosa consist of two sets, the lesser and greater cavernous nerves, which arise from the forepart of the prostatic plexus, and, after joining with branches from the pudendal nerve, pass forward beneath the pubic arch. Injury to the prostatic plexus (during prostatic resection for example) is highly likely to cause erectile dysfunction. It is because of this relationship that surgeons are careful to maintain the integrity of the prostatic fascial shell so as to not interrupt the post-ganglionic parasympathetic fibers that produce penile erection.
