= Labial thermistor clip =

Technique using light to measure the temperature of the labia minora

The labial thermistor clip is a device used to measure the skin temperature of the labia minora and is associated blood engorgement. This device consists of a thermistor affixed to a small metal clip that can be attached to the labia minora. The labial thermistor clip is the second most commonly used physiological measure of female genital response, next to the vaginal photoplethysmograph (VPG). Both devices can be used simultaneously. The labial thermistor clip has some advantages over VPG, including better test-retest reliability, greater correlation between genital and self-reported sexual arousal, and an absolute unit of change (temperature). Like VPG, the labial thermistor clip has discriminant validity; that is, it detects differences between sexual and nonsexual stimuli. It is also sensitive to different levels of sexual arousal. The labial thermistor clip has some disadvantages because participants have difficulty with placing the device correctly and some report discomfort with using the device.

== See also ==
- Clitoral photoplethysmograph
- Penile plethysmograph
- Vaginal photoplethysmograph
