= Nocturnal penile tumescence =

Spontaneous erection during or after sleep

Nocturnal penile tumescence (NPT) is a spontaneous erection of the penis during sleep or when waking up. Along with nocturnal clitoral tumescence, it is also known as sleep-related erection. Colloquially, the term morning wood, or less commonly, morning glory is also used, although this is more commonly used to refer specifically to an erection beginning during sleep and persisting into the period just after waking.

Men without physiological erectile dysfunction or severe depression experience nocturnal penile tumescence, usually three to five times during a period of sleep, typically during rapid eye movement sleep. Nocturnal penile tumescence is believed to contribute to penile health.

== Mechanism ==
The cause of nocturnal penile tumescence is not known with certainty. In a wakeful state, in the presence of mechanical stimulation with or without an arousal, erection is initiated by the parasympathetic division of the autonomic nervous system with minimal input from the central nervous system. Parasympathetic branches extend from the sacral plexus of the spinal nerves into the arteries supplying the erectile tissue; upon stimulation, these nerve branches release acetylcholine, which in turn causes release of nitric oxide from endothelial cells in the trabecular arteries, that eventually causes tumescence. Bancroft (2005) hypothesizes that the noradrenergic neurons of the locus ceruleus in the brain are perpetually inhibitory to penile erection, and that the cessation of their discharge that occurs during rapid eye movement sleep may allow testosterone-related excitatory actions to manifest as nocturnal penile tumescence. Suh et al. (2003) recognizes that in particular the spinal regulation of the cervical cord is critical for nocturnal erectile activity.

The nerves that control one's ability to have a reflex erection are located in the sacral nerves (S2-S4) of the spinal cord. Evidence supporting the possibility that a full bladder can stimulate an erection has existed for some time and is characterized as a 'reflex erection'. A full bladder is known to mildly stimulate nerves in the same region. The possibility of a full bladder causing an erection, especially during sleep, is perhaps further supported by the beneficial physiological effect of an erection inhibiting urination, thereby helping to avoid nocturnal enuresis (bed-wetting). However, given females have a similar phenomenon called nocturnal clitoral tumescence, prevention of nocturnal enuresis is not likely a sole supporting cause.

In a study published in 1972, during puberty, the average tumescence time per night was 159 min; average REM sleep time was 137 min. Average simultaneous REM sleep and penile tumescence per night was 102 min. Study subjects averaged 6.85 tumescence episodes/night, and, of these, 5.15 occurred during a REM sleep period. Tumescence episodes during REM averaged 30.8 min in duration, whereas episodes which occurred when no REM was present averaged 11.75 min. Study subjects had at least four REM periods per night and at least three tumescence episodes.

In another study of healthy older people published in 1988, frequency and duration of nocturnal penile tumescence decreased progressively with age independent of variations in sleep. In contrast to younger age groups, the majority of those above age 60 did not have full sleep erections even though they and their partners reported regular intercourse.

Unlike physiological penile tumescence, sleep-related painful erections (SRPE) and stuttering priapism (SP) are much rarer pathological erections, resulting in poor sleep and daytime tiredness, and long term cardiovascular morbidity. SRPE is a rare parasomnia consisting of nocturnal penile tumescence accompanied by pain that awakens the individual. It occurs predominantly during REM sleep, without an apparent underlying illness or penile anatomic abnormalities. In contrast, stuttering priapism can occur spontaneously at any time of the day, but more commonly so during REM sleep. SP is a subtype of ischemic priapism that is characterized by recurrent, self-limiting, painful erections that often require maneuvers (compression, cold packs or a cold shower, voiding, or exercise, etc.) to aid detumescence. In ischemic priapism, most of the penis is hard; however, the glans penis is not. Much rarer priapism is secondary to blunt trauma to the perineum or penis, with laceration of the cavernous artery, which can generate an arterial-lacunar fistula resulting in a high blood flow state, hence the tumescence. Tumescence lasting for more than four hours is a medical emergency. At the time being, no treatment consensus for SRPE has been established. Baclofen tablets taken before sleep is the most commonly used medication, having a tolerable profile of adverse effects.

== Diagnostic value ==
The existence and predictability of nocturnal tumescence is used by sexual health practitioners to ascertain whether a given case of erectile dysfunction is psychological or physiological in origin. A patient presenting with erectile dysfunction is fitted with an elastic device to wear around the patient's penis during sleep; the device detects changes in girth and relays the information to a computer for later analysis. If nocturnal tumescence is detected, then the erectile dysfunction is presumed to be due to a psychosomatic illness such as sexual anxiety; if not, then it is presumed to be due to a physiological cause.

== See also ==
- Nocturnal clitoral tumescence
- Nocturnal emission
- Priapism
- Sleep sex
- Swelling
- Tumescence
