= Sexual arousal =

Physiological and psychological changes in preparation for sexual intercourse

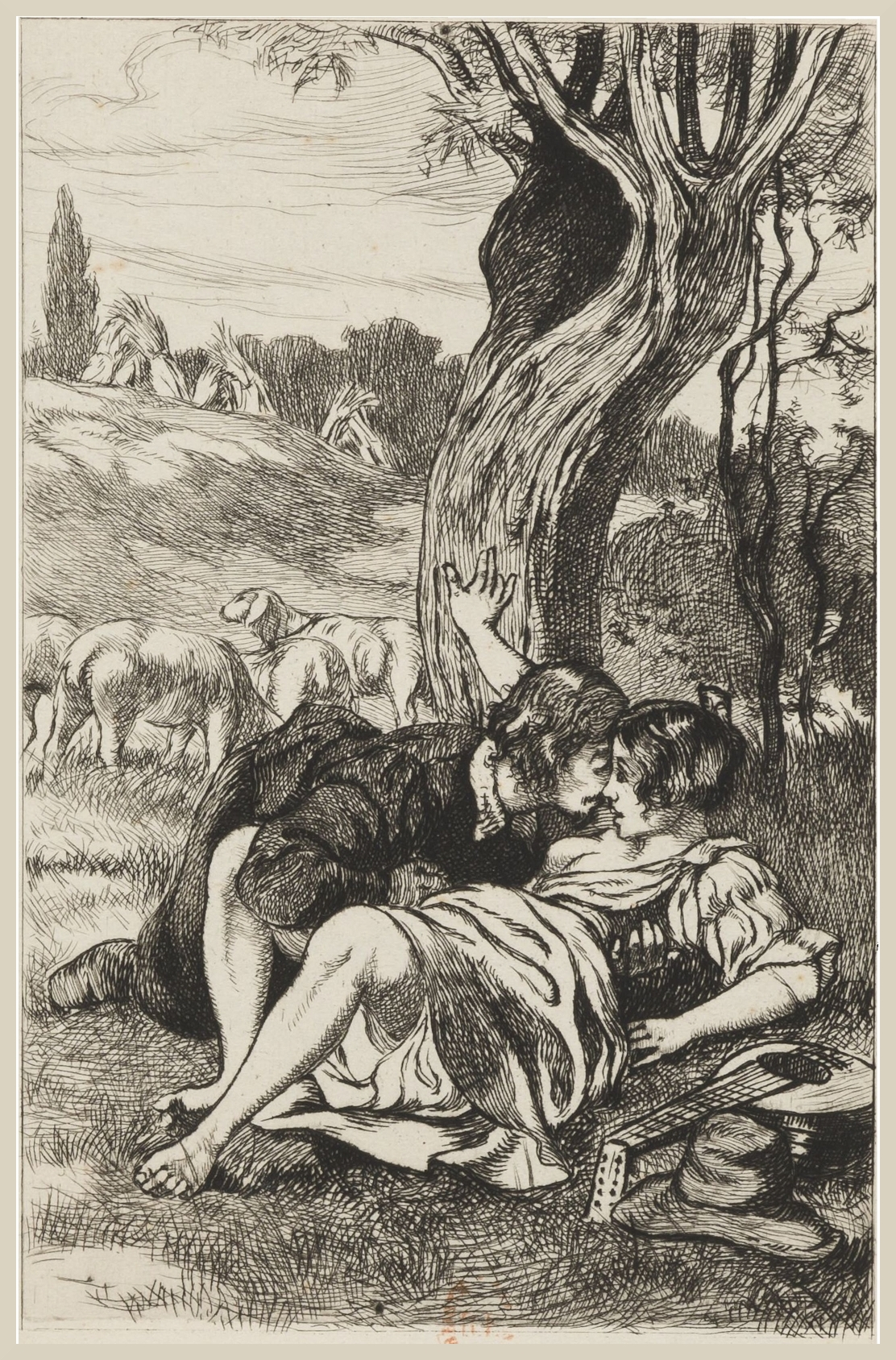
Martin van Maële's print Francion 15

Sexual arousal (also known as sexual excitement) describes the physiological and psychological responses in preparation for sexual intercourse or when exposed to sexual stimuli. A number of physiological responses occur in the body and mind as preparation for sexual intercourse, and continue during intercourse. Male arousal leads to erection, cremaster reflex and pre-ejaculate; in female arousal, the body's response is engorged sexual tissues (such as nipples, clitoris, and vaginal walls), changes to the cervix, and vaginal lubrication.

Sexual arousal has several stages and may not lead to any actual sexual activity after mental stimuli have brought about accompanying physiological changes. Physical stimuli, such as touch, and the internal fluctuation of hormones can influence sexual arousal. Given sufficient and appropriate sexual stimulation in the right context, sexual arousal intensifies to a high level and can precipitate an orgasm as part of the climax. Mental or physical stimulation may also be pursued for their own sake, even in the absence of orgasm.

== Erotic stimuli ==
Depending on the situation, a person can be sexually aroused by a variety of factors, both physical and mental. A person may be sexually aroused by another person or by particular aspects of that person, or by a non-human object or scenario. The physical stimulation of an erogenous zone or acts of foreplay can result in arousal, especially if it is accompanied with the anticipation of imminent sexual activity. Sexual arousal may be assisted by a romantic setting, music or other soothing situation. Sexual arousal can come from porn or other sexual material. The potential stimuli for sexual arousal vary from person to person, and from one time to another, as does the level of arousal.

Stimuli can be classified according to the sense involved: somatosensory (touch), visual, and olfactory (scent). Auditory stimuli are also possible, though they are generally considered secondary in role to the other three. Erotic stimuli which can result in sexual arousal can include conversation, reading, films or images, or a smell or setting, any of which can generate erotic thoughts and memories in a person. Given the right context, these may lead to the person desiring physical contact, including kissing, cuddling, and petting of an erogenous zone. This may in turn make the person desire direct sexual stimulation of the breasts, nipples, buttocks or genitals, and further sexual activity.

Erotic stimuli may originate from a source unrelated to the object of subsequent sexual interest. For example, many people may find nudity, erotica or pornography sexually arousing. This may generate a general sexual interest that is satisfied by sexual activity. When sexual arousal is achieved by or dependent on the use of objects, it is referred to as sexual fetishism, or in some instances a paraphilia.

There is a common belief that females need more time to achieve arousal. However, recent scientific research has shown that there is no considerable difference for the time males and females require to become fully aroused. Scientists from McGill University Health Centre in Montreal used the method of thermal imaging to record baseline temperature change in genital area to define the time necessary for sexual arousal. Researchers studied the time required for an individual to reach the peak of sexual arousal while watching sexually explicit movies or pictures and came to the conclusion that on average males and females took almost the same time for sexual arousal – around 10 minutes. The time needed for foreplay is strongly individual and varies from one occasion to the next depending on circumstances.

Unlike many animals, humans do not have a mating season, and both sexes are capable of sexual arousal throughout the year.

== Disorders ==
When a person fails to be aroused in a situation that would normally produce arousal and the lack of arousal is persistent, it may indicate a sexual arousal disorder or hypoactive sexual desire disorder. There are many reasons why a person fails to be aroused, including a mental disorder such as depression, drug use, or a medical or physical condition. There may also be a lack of sexual desire generally or for the current partner. A person may always have had no or low sexual desire or the lack of desire may have started later in life.

Contrastingly, a person may be hypersexual, either having high sexual desire in relation to culture or expected development, or suffering from a persistent genital arousal disorder, causing spontaneous, persistent, and uncontrollable arousal, and the physiological changes associated with arousal.

== Physiological and psychological responses ==
=== Physiological responses ===
Sexual arousal causes various physical responses, most significantly in the sex organs (genital organs). Sexual arousal for a male is usually indicated by the swelling and erection of the penis when blood fills the corpus cavernosum. This is usually the most prominent and reliable sign of sexual arousal in males. In a female, sexual arousal leads to increased blood flow to the clitoris and the rest of the vulva, as well as vaginal transudation - the seeping of moisture through the vaginal walls, which serves as lubrication. In both sexes, pupil dilation is an involuntary physiological response to sexual arousal. However, the degree of pupil dilation varies with individuals, as does the degree of maximal pupil dilation.

In males:	In females:
Male sexual arousal. On the left, the male genitalia are in regular, flaccid state. On the right, the male is sexually aroused, the penis is erect and the scrotum is tense.: Erection of nipples; Penile tumescence and erection; The veins in the penis may become more prominent; Tightening and/or retraction of the foreskin often exposing the glans penis; Emission of pre-ejaculatory fluid; Swelling of the testicles; Ascension of the testicles; Tensing and thickening of the scrotum; Pupil dilation	Female sexual arousal. On the left, the female genitalia are in regular state. On the right, the female is sexually aroused, the vulva is wet and its labia are slightly engorged.: Erection of nipples; Vaginal lubrication; Vasocongestion of the vaginal walls; Tumescence and erection of the clitoral glans and labia; Elevation of the uterus and its cervix (vaginal tenting); Tenting, i.e. expansion of the inner two-thirds of the vagina; Change in shape, color and size of the labia majora and labia minora; Pupil dilation; Widening of the areola

==== Male ====
It is normal to correlate the erection of the penis with male sexual arousal. Physical or psychological stimulation, or both, leads to vasodilation and the increased blood flow engorges the three spongy areas that run along the length of the penis (the two corpora cavernosa and the corpus spongiosum). The penis grows enlarged and firm, the skin of the scrotum is pulled tighter, and the testicles are pulled up against the body. However, the relationship between erection and arousal is not one-to-one (arousal non-concordance). After their mid-forties, some men report that they do not always have an erection when they are sexually aroused. Equally, a male erection can occur during sleep (nocturnal penile tumescence) without conscious sexual arousal or due to mechanical stimulation (e.g., rubbing against the bed sheet) alone. A young male—or one with a strong libido—may experience enough sexual arousal for an erection to result from a passing thought, or just the sight of a passerby. Once erect, their penis may gain enough stimulation from contact with the inside of his clothing to maintain and encourage it for some time.

As sexual arousal and stimulation continues, it is likely that the glans or head of the erect penis will swell wider and, as the genitals become further engorged with blood, their color deepens. As the testicles continue to rise, a feeling of warmth may develop around them and the perineum. With further sexual stimulation, their heart rate increases, blood pressure rises and breathing becomes quicker. The increase in blood flow in the genital and other regions may lead to a sex flush in some men.

As sexual stimulation continues, orgasm begins, when the muscles of the pelvic floor, the vasa deferentia (between the testicles and the prostate), the seminal vesicles and the prostate gland itself may begin to contract in a way that forces sperm and semen into the urethra inside the penis. Once this has started, it is likely that the man will continue to ejaculate and orgasm fully, with or without further stimulation.

Equally, if sexual stimulation stops before orgasm, the physical effects of the stimulation, including the vasocongestion, will subside in a short time. Repeated or prolonged stimulation without orgasm and ejaculation can lead to discomfort in the testes (corresponding to the slang term "blue balls").

After ejaculation, men usually experience a refractory period characterized by loss of their erection, a subsidence in any sex flush, less interest in sexual activity, and a feeling of relaxation that can be attributed to the neurohormones oxytocin and prolactin. The intensity and duration of the refractory period can be very short in a highly aroused young man in a highly arousing situation, perhaps without even a noticeable loss of erection. It can be as long as a few hours or days in middle-aged and older men.

==== Female ====
The beginnings of sexual arousal in a female's body is usually marked by vaginal lubrication (wetness; though this can occur without arousal due to infection or cervical mucus production around ovulation), swelling and engorgement of the vulva, and internal lengthening and enlargement of the vagina. There have been studies to find the degree of correlation between these physiological responses and the female's subjective sensation of being sexually aroused: the findings usually are that in some cases there is a high correlation, while in others, it is surprisingly low.

Further stimulation can lead to additional vaginal wetness and further engorgement and swelling of the clitoris and the labia, along with increased redness or darkening of the skin in these areas as blood flow increases. Further changes to the internal organs also occur including to the internal shape of the vagina and to the position of the uterus within the pelvis. Other changes include an increase in heart rate as well as in blood pressure, feeling hot and flushed and perhaps experiencing tremors. A sex flush may extend over the chest and upper body.

If sexual stimulation continues, then sexual arousal may peak into orgasm. After orgasm, some females do not want any further stimulation and the sexual arousal quickly dissipates. Suggestions have been published for continuing the sexual excitement and moving from one orgasm into further stimulation and maintaining or regaining a state of sexual arousal that can lead to second and subsequent orgasms. Some women have experienced such multiple orgasms quite spontaneously.

While young women may become sexually aroused quite easily, and reach orgasm relatively quickly with the right stimulation in the right circumstances, there are physical and psychological changes to women's sexual arousal and responses as they age. Older women produce less vaginal lubrication and studies have investigated changes to degrees of satisfaction, frequency of sexual activity, to desire, sexual thoughts and fantasies, sexual arousal, beliefs about and attitudes to sex, pain, and the ability to reach orgasm in women in their 40s and after menopause. Other factors have also been studied including socio-demographic variables, health, psychological variables, partner variables such as their partner's health or sexual problems, and lifestyle variables. It appears that these other factors often have a greater impact on women's sexual functioning than their menopausal status. It is therefore seen as important always to understand the "context of women's lives" when studying their sexuality.

Reduced estrogen levels may be associated with increased vaginal dryness and less clitoral erection when aroused, but are not directly related to other aspects of sexual interest or arousal. In older women, decreased pelvic muscle tone may mean that it takes longer for arousal to lead to orgasm, may diminish the intensity of orgasms, and then cause more rapid resolution. The uterus typically contracts during orgasm and, with advancing age, those contractions may actually become painful.

=== Psychological responses ===
Psychological sexual arousal involves appraisal and evaluation of a stimulus, categorization of a stimulus as sexual, and an affective response. The combination of cognitive and physiological states elicits psychological sexual arousal. Some suggest that psychological sexual arousal results from an interaction of cognitive and experiential factors, such as affective state, previous experience, and current social context.

==== Male ====
The relationship between sexual desire and arousal in men is complex, with a wide range of factors increasing or decreasing sexual arousal. Physiological responses, such as heart rate, blood pressure, and erection, are often discordant with self-reported subjective perceptions of arousal. This inconsistency suggests that psychological or cognitive aspects also have a strong effect on sexual arousal. The cognitive aspects of sexual arousal in men are not completely known, but the state does involve the appraisal and evaluation of the stimulus, categorization of the stimulus as sexual, and an affective response. Research suggests that cognitive factors, such as sexual motivation, perceived gender role expectations, and sexual attitudes, contribute to sex differences observed in subjective sexual arousal. Specifically, while watching heterosexual erotic videos, men are more influenced by the sex of the actors portrayed in the stimulus, and men may be more likely than women to objectify the actors. There are reported differences in brain activation to sexual stimuli, with men showing higher levels of amygdala and hypothalamic responses than women. This suggests the amygdala plays a critical role in the processing of sexually arousing visual stimuli in men.

==== Female ====
Research suggests that cognitive factors like sexual motivation, perceived gender role expectations, and sexual attitudes play important roles in women's self-reported levels of sexual arousal. In her alternative model of sexual response, Basson suggests that women's need for intimacy prompts them to engage with sexual stimuli, which leads to an experience of sexual desire and psychological sexual arousal. Psychological sexual arousal also has an effect on physiological mechanisms; Goldey and van Anders showed that sexual cognitions impact hormone levels in women, such that sexual thoughts result in a rapid increase in testosterone in women who were not using hormonal contraception. In terms of brain activation, researchers have suggested that amygdala responses are not solely determined by level of self-reported sexual arousal; Hamann and colleagues found that women self-reported higher sexual arousal than men, but experienced lower levels of amygdala responses.

== Models of human sexual response ==
=== Human sexual response cycle ===
During the late 1950s and early 1960s, William H. Masters and Virginia E. Johnson conducted multiple studies into human sexuality. In 1966, they published Human Sexual Response, detailing four stages of physiological changes in humans during sexual stimulation: excitement, plateau, orgasm, and resolution.

=== Singer's model of sexual arousal ===
Barry Singer presented a model of the process of sexual arousal in 1984, in which he conceptualized human sexual response to be composed of three independent but generally sequential components. The first stage, aesthetic response, is an emotional reaction to noticing an attractive face or figure. This emotional reaction produces an increase in attention toward the object of attraction, typically involving head and eye movements toward the attractive object. The second stage, approach response, progresses from the first and involves bodily movements towards the object. The final genital response stage recognizes that with both attention and closer proximity, physical reactions result in genital tumescence. Singer also stated that there is an array of other autonomic responses, but acknowledges that the research literature suggests that the genital response is the most reliable and convenient to measure in males.

=== Basson's sexual response cycle ===
In 2000, Rosemary Basson presented an alternative model to the human sexual response cycle that is specific to women's sexual response. She argues that gender differences in sex drive, sexual motivation, sexual concordance, and capacity for orgasm underlie the need for an alternative model of sexual response. While the human sexual response cycle begins with desire, followed by arousal, orgasm, and finally resolution, Basson's alternative model is circular and begins with women feeling a need for intimacy, which leads her to seek out and be receptive to sexual stimuli; women then feel sexual arousal, in addition to sexual desire. The cycle results in an enhanced feeling of intimacy. Basson emphasizes the idea that a lack of spontaneous desire should not be taken as an indication of female sexual dysfunction; many women experience sexual arousal and responsive desire simultaneously when they are engaged in sexual activity.

=== Toates's incentive-motivation model ===
Frederick Toates presented a model of sexual motivation, arousal, and behavior in 2009 that combines the principles of incentive-motivation theory and hierarchical control of behavior. The basic incentive-motivation model of sex suggests that incentive cues in the environment invade the nervous system, which results in sexual motivation. Positive sexual experiences enhance motivation, while negative experiences reduce it. Motivation and behaviour are organized hierarchically; each are controlled by a combination of direct (external stimuli) and indirect (internal cognitions) factors. Excitation and inhibition of behavior act at various levels of this hierarchical structure. For instance, an external stimulus may directly excite sexual arousal and motivation below a conscious level of awareness, while an internal cognition can elicit the same effects indirectly, through the conscious representation of a sexual image. In the case of inhibition, sexual behavior can be active or conscious (e.g., choosing not to have sex) or it can be passive or unconscious (e.g., being unable to have sex due to fear). Toates emphasizes the importance considering cognitive representations in addition to external stimuli; he suggests that mental representations of incentives are interchangeable with excitatory external stimuli for eliciting sexual arousal and motivation.

=== Bancroft and Janssen's dual control model ===
This model created by John Bancroft and Erick Janssen, previously at the Kinsey Institute, explores the individual variability of sexual response. They postulate that this variability depends on the interaction between an individual's sexual excitation system (SES) and sexual inhibition system (SIS). Popularized by Emily Nagoski's self-help book Come as You Are, the SES has been described as the sexual response's 'accelerator' and the SIS as the 'brake'. The SIS/SES questionnaire was developed to assess an individual's SIS and SES levels. A factor analysis of the SIS/SES questionnaire, revealed a single excitation factor and two inhibition factors. These inhibition factors were interpreted as SIS1 (inhibition due to the threat of performance failure) and SIS2 (inhibition due to the threat of performance consequences).

The SIS/SES questionnaire was originally developed for men though it has since proven its statistical validity among women. Despite this, the SESII-W (the Sexual Excitation/Sexual Inhibition Inventory for Women) was created by Graham and associates. Female focus groups found that the context of the emotional relationship between sexual partners was not fully represented in the original SIS/SES questionnaire. A factor analysis of this questionnaire revealed only two factors: sexual excitation (SE) and sexual inhibition (SI). This may point to internal inconsistencies in the SIS/SES questionnaire regarding gender. One lower order factor in the SESII-W labeled Arousal Contingency was particularly relevant; this factor explains the easy disruption of sexual arousal.

Regardless of the difference in these two questionnaires, both surveys' scores show normal distribution verifying the hypothesis that there is a normal individual variation in sexual arousal and inhibition. In the original SIS/SES questionnaire, statistically significant gender differences are seen despite considerable overlap in scores between men and women. On average, males score higher on sexual excitation and lower than females on both facets of sexual inhibition. The differences in scores between genders have not been explained beyond the theoretical level.

The source of individual variability on the sexual excitation and inhibition systems is not known definitively. Even less is known about how these systems develop in individuals. Age of first masturbation has been used as a measure to assess sexual development. Age of masturbatory onset is much more variable in girls than boys, whose tend to be close to puberty. Researchers have not determined whether this gender difference is biological in nature or influenced by sociocultural values. One twin-study has found evidence for the heritability of both factors of SIS, but research suggests that SES variability is down to environmental factors.

The majority of studies investigating sexual functioning use heterosexual participants exclusively, limiting the generalizability of the dual control model. One study comparing heterosexual and gay men found that gay men had similar scores for SIS2, but scored significantly higher for SIS1 and SES. Heterosexual, lesbian, and bisexual women's scores on the SESII-W found that bisexual women scored higher on SES than the other groups and heterosexual women scored higher on the sexual inhibition factor than both the lesbian and bisexual women. More studies need to be done using the dual control model to gain a more broad view of sexual orientation and sexual arousability.

== Assessment of genital arousal ==
One way to study sexual arousal in women and men is to conduct sexual psychophysiological research in a laboratory setting. This field of research looks at physical sexual responses in addition to mental and emotional experiences of sexual arousal.

=== Experimental studies ===
Various hypotheses and theories have been propounded in order to establish the biological bases for sexual arousal in humans. Ivan Tarkhanov showed, in experiments on cutting and artificial emptying of the seminal vesicles, that the latter played the crucial role in the generation of sexual excitement in frogs. Proceeding from these experimental results, Tarkhanov put forward a hypothesis that filling and evacuation of the seminal vesicles were the main biological cause, which led to sexual arousal and its disappearance in humans and other mammals. Ever since Tarkhanov's findings demonstrated sexual arousal in frogs to result from the state of seminal vesicles, the attempted elucidation of their role in other animals' sexual behaviour has been the object of experimental effort. No generalisation has yet appeared, however. The study performed by Beach & Wilson (University of California, Berkeley) in 1964 discovered that these glands do not participate in the regulation of sexual arousal of male rats in the similar manner. Whether the regularity observed in frogs is applicable to humans remains unknown. Unambiguous experimental evidence for the existence of the Tarkhanov regularity in human sexual behaviour has never been obtained.

Another explanation of sexual arousal is offered by the approach, which Kazimierz Imieliński calls the "psychohydraulic model of sexuality". This point of view likens human sexuality to a steam boiler, with biological processes or internal irritants creating sexual tension. If the level of this tension reaches threshold, sexual arousal occurs as the expression of necessity to let off steam. Gary F. Kelly (Clarkson University) describes this model as follows:

For centuries, the assumption was made that the longing for sexual interaction was innate, and an inner drive model was used to explain it. It has been suggested that this model was much like a metaphor for a steam boiler. Internal sexual "steam" would build up until the pressure became so great that the drive to release it was very strong. This view also assumed that there was some adverse physical consequence of not releasing the pressure.

The "psychohydraulic model of sexuality" has been formulated most definitely in psychoanalysis:

The instinct causes tensions within the central nervous system, which spread out over the whole being; it is urgent and irresistible in nature and constantly repeats itself. ... An erection, for example, is pleasurable and painful at the same time. With an increase of sexual excitation, the tension increases and becomes wholly unpleasurable. This condition becomes so unbearable that the individual is forced to seek release from these tensions and liberation from the painful feelings. ... The pain of tension which accompanies the increase in the intensity of the instinctual drives changes, with the discharge, into the pleasure of relaxation.

After a certain time, the same process begins anew. Such an approach assumes sexual arousal to be a spontaneous desire that appears periodically like sensations of hunger and thirst. Drawing a parallel between these sensations and sexual excitation is widely accepted now: "Everyone must experience sexuality in some way to survive. ... In this sense sex is a necessity of life, just as air, food, and warmth." And yet there is no empirical evidence in support of such a parallel, Imieliński says. Sensations of hunger and thirst occur due to certain states of physiological insufficiency. The feeling of hunger results from the lack of glucose, fats and amino acids in blood. The feeling of thirst occurs in response to reduction of the water content of tissues. None of similar states of physiological deficiency responsible for the periodical appearance of sexual arousal has been revealed in human sexuality.

=== Females ===
Sexual arousal in women is characterized by vasocongestion of the genital tissues, including internal and external areas (e.g., vaginal walls, clitoris, and labia). There are a variety of methods used to assess genital sexual arousal in women. Vaginal photoplethysmography (VPG) can measure changes in vaginal blood volume or phasic changes in vasocongestion associated with each heartbeat. Clitoral photoplethysmography functions in a similar way to VPG, but measures changes in clitoral blood volume, rather than vaginal vasocongestion. Thermography provides a direct measure of genital sexual arousal by measuring changes in temperature associated with increased blood flow to the vulvar tissues. Similarly, labial thermistor clips measure changes in temperature associated with genital engorgement; this method directly measures changes in temperature of the labia. More recently, laser Doppler imaging (LDI) has been used as a direct measure of genital sexual arousal in women. LDI functions by measuring superficial changes in blood flow in the vulvar tissues.

=== Males ===
The most obvious response involved with sexual behaviour in males is penile erection. The use of the volume (or circumference) change during penile erection as a convenient measure of sexual arousal was first developed by Kurt Freund. This measurement of blood flow to the male genitals is known as penile plethysmography. This is commonly measured using a strain gauge, a simple mercury strain gauge encompassed in a ring of rubber. The ring surrounds the penis, but does not constrict or cause discomfort. The measure has been found by some to be a reliable and valid measurement of male arousal. More recently, thermography has been developed to measure the physiological measurements of sexual arousal. Studies have found temperature change specific to the genitals during sexual arousal, which supports the validity of this measure.

== Category-specificity ==
Category-specificity refers to a person showing sexual arousal to the categories of people they prefer to have sex with. Sexual arousal studies involving category-specificity look at genital responses (physiological changes), as well as subjective responses (what people report their arousal levels to be). Category-specific sexual arousal is more commonly found amongst men than women. Heterosexual men experience much higher genital and subjective arousal to women than to men. This pattern is reversed for homosexual men.

Studies have found that women have a non-category-specific genital response pattern of sexual arousal, meaning their genital responses are only modestly related to their preferred category. On the other hand, female subjective responses are category-specific, because they typically report their highest level of arousal to their preferred stimulus, although the reported difference in levels of arousal is typically much smaller than those in men. A possible explanation for the non-category specific genital arousal in women, which also accounts for their high individual variation, is the "preparation hypothesis". This hypothesis suggests that, provided there is enough of an increase in vaginal blood flow for vaginal lubrication to occur in a sexual context, the magnitude of arousal need not be consistent. That is, the hypothesis is that vaginal lubrication can take place as a protective mechanism even in a non-preferred sexual situation, such as when sexual activity is non-consensual.

Other researchers argue that since the research is done on people who volunteer to be studied, the observed levels of category specificity may not represent the population, that there may be different cultural expectations of sexual interests being linked to genital arousal that make men with non-category specific genital arousal less likely to appear as test subjects. There researchers also argue that the assumption that men are always sexually interested in what causes genital arousal removes its own falsifiability by explaining all contradictory data away as "denial", making the theory untestable.

=== Overlapping brain variables and sexual arousal ===
While there is disagreement among neurologists on whether or not it is possible to categorically distinguish male brains and female brains by measuring many variables in the brain, neurologists agree that all single variables in the brain display more individual variation and overlap between the sexes than differences between the sexes. For instance, men and women alike are capable of classifying sex acts as sexual, no matter if they find them appealing or not, making a genital response to unappealing erotic stimuli a single-step mechanism. Neurologists, therefore, argue that category specificity of genital response to erotic imagery, being determined by one or a small number of closely linked brain mechanisms and therefore not subject to significant multivariate effects, cannot be subject to such a large sex difference as that apparent in plethysmographic studies. These neurologists cite the existence of significant volunteering bias among men but not women in erotica research, in particular that the overrepresentation of erectile dysfunction yet underrepresentation of sexuality-related shame in volunteers is consistent with the hypothesis that genital response to both sexual relevance and appeal allows for a stronger erectile function than response only to appeal and that a majority of the male population are ashamed of their responses to unappealing stimuli, accounting for the discrepancy between the report from most heterosexual couples that male erection is faster than female lubrication and the appearance on pletysmography volunteers that female lubrication is at least as fast as male erection. They also argue that the appearance of a greater individual variability in female genital response than in male genital response is consistent with a representative female sample and a male sample subject to bias that leaves much of the individual variability unstudied, with a reference to the neurological observation that all brain structures display significant individual variability in both sexes and that no brain structure is variable only in females and not in males.

== Arousal concordance and non-concordance ==
Sexual arousal results in a combination of physiological and psychological factors, like genital sexual response and subjective experience of sexual arousal. The degree to which genital and subjective sexual response correspond is termed concordance. Arousal non-concordance is when there is no link, for example, in morning erection, which happens both with men (nocturnal penile tumescence) and women (nocturnal clitoral tumescence), or in cases of rape where research confirms reports of an arousal non-concordance orgasm or orgasm alike event can take place – presumably as a measure to protect the internal organs of the vagina.

Research has shown a reliable gender difference in concordance of sexual arousal, such that men have a higher level of concordance between genital and subjective sexual responding than women do. Some researchers argue that this gender difference can be attributed to the type of method used to assess genital responding in women. There may be a difference in women's ability to perceive internal versus external genital engorgement subjectively, as measured by vaginal photoplethysmography (VPG) and thermography respectively. Chivers and colleagues found that men's and women's concordance was more similar when thermography was used as a measure of genital sexual arousal than when VPG was used. However, few studies using thermography have been conducted and further research is required to determine whether the gender difference in concordance is a measurement artifact or a true phenomenon.

== Hormones ==
Several hormones affect sexual arousal, including testosterone, cortisol, and estradiol. However, the specific roles of these hormones are not clear. Testosterone is the most commonly studied hormone involved with sexuality. It plays a key role in sexual arousal in males, with strong effects on central arousal mechanisms. The connection between testosterone and sexual arousal is more complex in females. Research has found testosterone levels increase as a result of sexual cognitions in females that do not use hormonal contraception. Also, women who participate in polyandrous relationships have higher levels of testosterone. However, it is unclear whether higher levels of testosterone cause increased arousal and in turn multiple partners or whether sexual activity with multiple partners cause the increase in testosterone. Inconsistent study results point to the idea that while testosterone may play a role in the sexuality of some women, its effects can be obscured by the co-existence of psychological or affective factors in others.

== Other animals ==
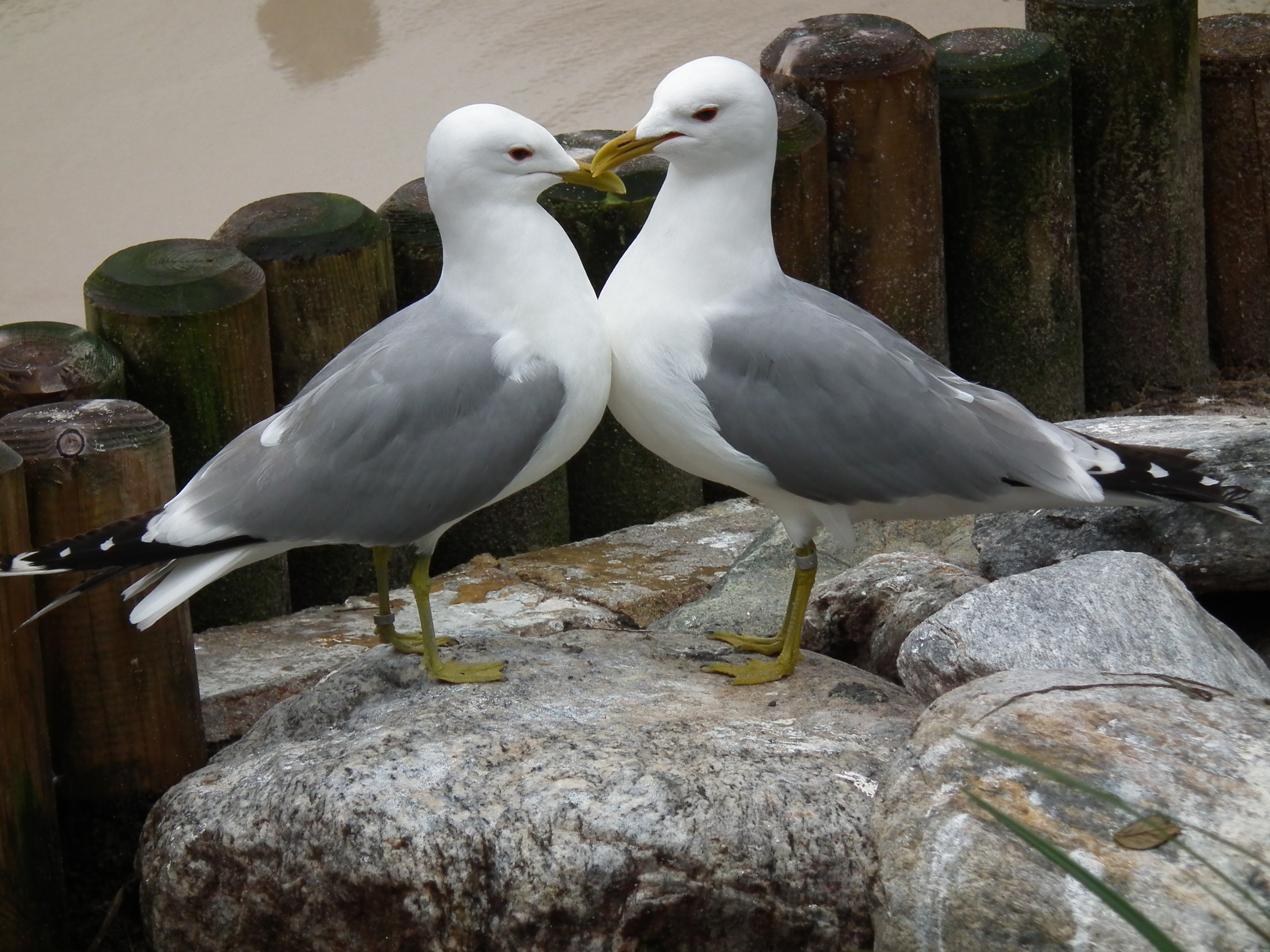
Two gulls that appear to be exhibiting affection

While human sexuality is well understood, scientists do not completely grasp how other animals relate sexually. However, current research studies suggest that many animals, like humans, enjoy sexual relations that are not limited to reproduction. Dolphins and bonobos, for example, are both well known to use sex as a "social tool to strengthen and maintain bonds". Ethologists have long documented the exchanges of sex to promote group cohesion in social animals. Cementing social bondage is one of the most prominent theorized selective advantages of group selection theory. Experts in the evolution of sex such as John Maynard Smith advocate for the idea that the exchange of sexual favors helps congeal and localize the assortment of alleles in isolated population and therefore is potentially a very strong force in evolution. Smith has also written extensively on the "seminal fluid swapping theory" logistic application of the assortment of alleles as a more accurate synthetic depiction of the Hardy–Weinberg principle in cases of severely interbreeding populations.

== Evolutionary models ==
The effect of sexual response is thought to be a plastic positive reinforcement behavior modifier associated with the Baldwin effect. The display of secondary sex characteristics in humans such as a penis-like enlarged clitoris in females during arousal and gynecomastia in males are thought to have once been objects of mate selection in human evolution because of the persistence of the phenomenon of these features invoking sexual arousal for potential mates in cross-cultural studies. Similar evolutionary stimuli may also have resulted in novel structures such as the pseudo-penis of the female spotted hyena.

== See also ==
- Aphrodisiac
- Erectile tissue
- Kinsey Reports
- Nudity and sexuality
- Priapism
- Sexology
- Sexual frustration
