= Sexual concordance =

Study of sexual arousal and physiological genital response

Sexual concordance refers to the degree of correlation between subjective sexual arousal and physiological genital response. This phenomenon is often studied within the fields of sexology and psychology to understand the complex relationship between the mind and body during sexual activity.

== Overview ==
Sexual concordance examines how closely an individual's reported feelings of sexual arousal align with measurable physical signs of arousal, such as genital blood flow or even orgasm. Research indicates that there is often a significant difference between subjective and physiological sexual arousal, which can vary based on factors such as gender, sexual orientation, and individual properties. Such incongruity is called arousal non-concordance.

== Measurement Methods ==
Sexual arousal can be measured through various subjective and objective methods:

- Subjective: Self-reported questionnaires and interviews where individuals rate their level of sexual arousal.
- Objective: Physiological methods such as penile plethysmography (for men), vaginal photoplethysmography (for women), and thermography.

== Research Findings ==
Research has found differing patterns of sexual concordance among different groups:

- Gender differences: Studies generally show that men tend to have higher sexual concordance than women, meaning men's subjective arousal often closely matches their physiological arousal. Women's subjective and physiological arousal, however, are often less closely aligned.
- Sexual orientation: Sexual concordance can also vary with sexual orientation. For example, heterosexual and homosexual individuals may show different patterns of alignment between their subjective and physiological sexual responses.
- Individual variability: Factors such as psychological state, relationship satisfaction, and cultural background can influence sexual concordance.

== Proposed Explanations ==
Several hypotheses have been proposed to explain the phenomenon of sexual concordance and its greater variability in women compared to men:

- Genital protection hypothesis: One prominent theory suggests that the discrepancy between subjective and physiological sexual arousal in women serves an evolutionary function. According to this hypothesis, increased genital blood flow in women, even in the absence of subjective arousal, might protect the genital tissues from injury during non-consensual intercourse, such as rape.

== See also ==
- Sexual arousal
