= Clitoral photoplethysmograph =

Technique using light to measure the amount of blood in the clitoris

Clitoral photoplethysmography uses light to measure clitoral blood volume (CBV).

A clitoral photoplethysmograph is a small clear acrylic device that contains a light source, and a light detector. The light source illuminates the capillary bed of the clitoral tissue and the blood circulating within it. As clitoral engorgement increases, more light is reflected into the photosensitive cell of the device. The clitoral photoplethysmograph is placed by the participant between the labia minora; the light detector is oriented toward the clitoris. It can be attached to a vaginal photoplethysmograph so that both CBV and vaginal pulse amplitude (VPA) can be measured simultaneously.

Gerritsen found clitoral photoplethysmography to be a valid and sensitive tool for measuring female genital response. In contrast to vaginal photoplethysmography, clitoral photoplethysmographs are sensitive to the inhibition of sexual response. The authors suggest that clitoral photoplethysmography is particularly informative for examining sexual inhibition. Some researchers have posited that the procedure might be a viable instrument for assessing female sex offenders.

== See also ==
- Labial thermistor clip
- Penile plethysmography
- Vaginal photoplethysmography
