= Nocturnal clitoral tumescence =

Clitoral erection during or after sleep

Nocturnal clitoral tumescence (NCT) is a spontaneous swelling of the clitoris during sleep or when waking up. Also referred to as the "morning bean." Similar to the process in males, nocturnal penile tumescence, females experience clitoris tumescence and engorgement of the vagina, mainly during the REM sleep phase.

According to Fisher et al., the increase in vaginal blood flow associated with NCT during REM sleep is similar to the process in men in frequency, i.e. 95% of REM phases. It does occur a bit more often in non-REM sleep, and each episode appears shorter in duration. In terms of size, NCT is similar to that induced by erotic stimulation when awake. The erection may be associated with erotic dreams and even, occasionally, sleep orgasms. The phenomenon was first documented in 1970 by Karacan et al., with a single aforementioned follow-up study in 1983 by Fisher et al. More recent research includes a 2023 study by Gören et al., who found that their subjects displayed vaginal pH changes at different periods throughout the night. The study did not measure specific sleep phases. Increases in vaginal pH are associated with sexual arousal and clitoral erection. Bartholin's glands secrete alkaline fluid to lubricate the vagina during arousal, increasing vaginal pH.

== See also ==
- Rapid eye movement sleep
- Nocturnal penile tumescence
