= Vasocongestion =

Swelling of bodily tissues

Vasocongestion, vascular congestion or vascular engorgement is the swelling of bodily tissues caused by increased vascular blood flow and a localized increase in blood pressure. Typical causes of vasocongestion in humans includes menstruation, sexual arousal, REM sleep, strong emotions, illnesses, deep venous thrombosis (DVT) and allergic reactions.

== Illnesses ==
Menstrual cramps are one of the most common side effects of vasocongestion in adult females. Although pain and discomfort varies among individuals, vasocongestion is an essential part of the shedding of the lining of the uterus. Abnormal vasocongestion during the menstrual cycle can lead to irregular bleeding, severe and debilitating cramps and anemia caused by increased menstrual flow.

The temporary vasocongestion of the cheeks of the face is called blushing. It may be caused by the emotions of anger or embarrassment. The illness of rosacea is a chronic vasocongestion condition of the face that primarily affects the cheeks and nose, but may include other areas such as the eyes and chin.

Vasocongestion of the area around the human anus can lead to the formation of hemorrhoids.

== Human sexual behavior ==
Vasocongestion is essential for sexual procreation in mammals since this is the process that enables the hardening of a penis during an erection. The same force leads to the hardening of the clitoris and vaginal lubrication during sexual arousal. The decrease in vasocongestion in post-menopausal women may require some women to use artificial sexual lubricant to avoid pain during sexual intercourse. If there is pain however, sexual drive is typically diminished or absent.

Other forms of vasocongestion during human sexual activity include sex flush and the swelling of nipples in both men and women.

Unpleasant side effects of sex-related vasocongestion accompanied by sexual inactivity may lead to the cramp-like pain of "blue balls" in males and an unpleasant pelvic "heaviness" in women, similar to the start of the menstruation cycle.
