= John Bancroft (sexologist) =

American sexologist (born 1936)

- Born: John H.J. Bancroft; 1936 (age 89–90)
- Education: University of Cambridge (BA, MD)
- Occupation: Sexologist
- Scientific career
- Fields: Sexology

John H.J. Bancroft (born 1936) is an American sexologist who was Director of The Kinsey Institute for Research in Sex, Gender, and Reproduction at Indiana University from 1995 to 2004. He was a Clinical Professor of Psychiatry at Indiana University School of Medicine.

Bancroft received his B.A. in 1960 and his M.D. in 1970 from the Cambridge University. Bancroft was succeeded as Director of the Kinsey Institute in 2004 by Julia Heiman.

Bancroft was a practitioner of electroshock conversion therapy.
