= Sleep sex =

Sexsomnia
- Pronunciation: /sɛkˈsɒmni.ə/
- Specialty: Psychiatry, clinical psychology, sleep medicine
- Complications: Allegations of sexual assault; rape
- Causes: Stress, sleep deprivation, pre-existing parasomnia conditions, consumptions of alcohol or drugs
- Diagnostic method: Based on symptoms, clinical studies
- Treatment: Medications, anticonvulsant therapy, CPAP

Sexsomnia, also known as sleep sex, is a distinct form of parasomnia, or an abnormal activity that occurs while an individual is asleep. Sexsomnia is characterized by an individual engaging in sexual acts while in non-rapid eye movement (NREM) sleep. Sexual behaviors that result from sexsomnia are not to be mistaken with normal nocturnal sexual behaviors, which do not occur during NREM sleep. Sexual behaviors that are viewed as normal during sleep and are accompanied by extensive research and documentation include nocturnal emissions, nocturnal erections, and sleep orgasms.

Sexsomnia can present in an individual with other pre-existing sleep-related disorders.

Sexsomnia is most often diagnosed in males beginning in adolescence.

Although they may appear to be fully awake, individuals who have sexsomnia often have no recollection of the sexual behaviors they exhibit while asleep. As a result, the individual that they share the bed with notices and reports the sexual behavior.

In some cases, a medical diagnosis of sexsomnia has been used as a criminal defense in court for alleged sexual assault and rape cases.

== Classification ==
=== DSM-5 criteria ===
Under DSM-5 criteria, there are 11 diagnostic groups that comprise sleep-wake disorders. These include insomnia disorders, hypersomnolence disorders, narcolepsy, obstructive sleep apnea hypopnea, central sleep apnea, sleep-related hypoventilation, circadian rhythm sleep-wake disorders, non–rapid eye movement (NREM) sleep arousal disorders, nightmare disorders, rapid eye movement (REM) sleep behavior disorders, restless legs syndrome (RLS), and substance-medication-induced sleep disorders. Sexsomnia is classified under NREM arousal parasomnia.

==== NREM arousal parasomnia ====
Parasomnia disorders are classified into the following categories:

- arousal disorders
- sleep-wake transition disorders
- parasomnias associated with REM sleep

== Symptoms ==
Symptoms of sexsomnia include, but are not limited to:

- masturbation/oral sex
- Groping/fondling
- intercourse with climax
- sexual assault or rape
- moaning
- talking dirty while asleep

Sexsomnia often causes self-touching or sexual motions, but it can also cause an individual to seek sexual intimacy with others unknowingly. Sexsomnia may also occur at the same time as other parasomnia activities, such as sleepwalking or talking. Sometimes it is a partner, roommate, or parent, who first notices symptoms of the condition. Sexual partners might also notice that their partner has an abnormally heightened level of sexual aggression and decreased inhibitions randomly in the night.

A confusing characteristic for those witnessing an individual in an episode of sexsomnia is their eyes being open as this gives the appearance of the individual being awake and conscious, although the individual is completely unconscious and unaware of their actions.

== Causes ==
Symptoms of sexsomnia can be caused by or be associated with:

- stress factors
- sleep deprivation
- consumption of alcohol or other drugs
- pre-existing parasomnia behaviors

Sleep deprivation is known to have negative effects on the brain and behavior. Extended periods of sleep deprivation often results in the malfunctioning of neurons, directly affecting an individual's behavior. While muscles are able to regenerate even in the absence of sleep, neurons are incapable of this ability. Specific stages of sleep are responsible for the regeneration of neurons while others are responsible for the generation of new synaptic connections, the formation of new memories, etc.

Sexsomnia can also be triggered by physical contact initiated by a partner or another individual sharing the same bed.

=== Risk factors ===
Sexsomnia affects individuals of all age groups and backgrounds but present as an increased risk for individuals who experience the following:

- coexisting sleep disorders
- sleep disruption secondary to obstructive sleep apnea
- sleep related epilepsy
- certain medications

Behaviors such as pelvic thrusting, sexual arousal, and orgasm are often attributed to sleep-related epilepsy disorder. In some cases, physical contact with a partner in bed has been seen to trigger sexsomnia behaviors.

Certain medications, including the sedative-hypnotic zolpidem (commonly known by the brand name Ambien) frequently used to treat insomnia, have been seen to increase risk of sexsomnia as an adverse effect.

Like sleep-related eating disorders, sexsomnia presents more commonly in adults than children. However, these adult individuals usually have a history of parasomnia that began in childhood.

== Effects ==
It is possible for an individual who has sexsomnia to experience a variety of negative emotions due to the nature of their disorder. The following are commonly seen secondary effects of sexsomnia:

- Anger
- Confusion
- Denial
- Frustration
- Guilt
- Revulsion
- Shame

The effects of sexsomnia also extend to those in relationship with the patient. Whether the significant other is directly involved, in the case of sexual intercourse, or a bystander, in the case of masturbation behavior, they are often the first to recognize the abnormal behavior. These abnormal sexual behaviors may be unwanted by the partner, which could lead to the incident being defined as sexual assault.

== Mechanism ==
=== NREM sleep ===
Non-rapid eye movement sleep, or NREM, consists of three stages. Stage 1 is described as "drowsy sleep" or "somnolence" and is characterized by breathing rates becoming increasingly more consistent, the beginning of a decrease in muscle activity, and a decrease in heart rate. The typical duration of Stage 1 is around 10 minutes and accounts for approximately 5% of an individual's total sleep. Stage 2 is characterized by a further decline in muscle activity accompanied by a fading sense of consciousness of surroundings. Brain waves during Stage 2 are seen in the theta range. Stage 2 accounts for approximately 45-50% of an individual's total sleep. Stage 3 is the final stage of NREM sleep and the most common for parasomnias to occur. Also known as slow wave sleep (SWS), Stage 3 is characterized by brain temperature, respiratory rate, heart rate, and blood pressure being measured at their lowest. Representing approximately 15-20% of an individual's total sleep, brain waves during this stage are seen in the delta range. When an individual awakes during this stage, they are likely to exhibit grogginess and require up to thirty minutes to regain normal function and consciousness.

== Diagnosis ==
Though it is not possible for a definitive diagnosis of sexsomnia, a series of factors are considered to determine the presence of the condition. Clinical tests may also be utilized for further study.

=== Determining factors ===
Determining factors include but are not limited to:

- a family history of somnambulism or sleepwalking
- prior episodes of somnambulism
- disorientation when awoken
- observed confusional or autonomic behavior
- amnesia of episode
- trigger factors the individual possesses
- lack of regard to conceal episode
- the nature of event compared to the individual's baseline character

=== Clinical tests ===
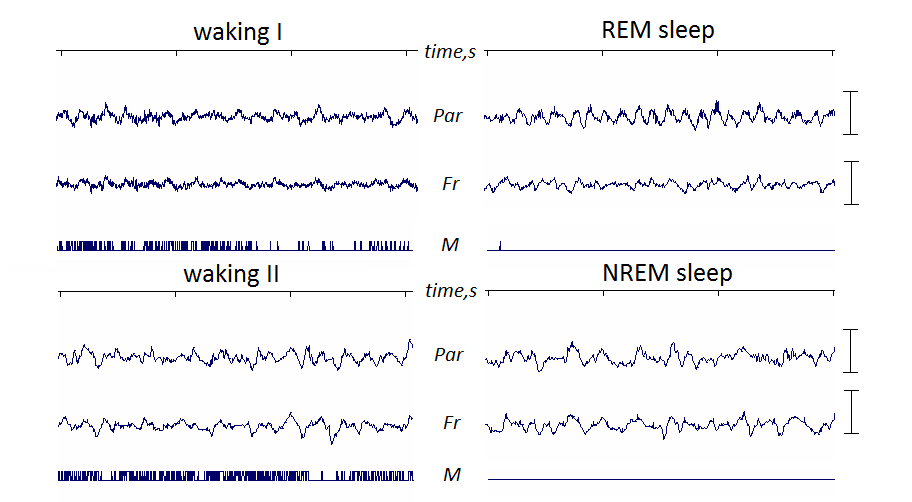

==== Electroencephalography ====
Electroencephalograms, or EEG, are tests used to depict electrical activity and waves produced by the brain. This test has the ability to detect abnormalities that are associated with disorders that affect brain activity. Episodes of sexsomnia occur most commonly during slow-wave-sleep, or SWS. During this stage of sleep, brain waves tend to slow down and become larger. Through the use of electroencephalography, health professionals are able to determine if the sexual behaviors are occurring during non-REM sleep or if the individual is fully conscious.

==== Polysomnography ====
Polysomnography is a study conducted while the individual being observed is asleep. A polysomnograph (PSG) is a recording of an individual's body functions as they sleep. Specialized electrodes and monitors are connected to the individual and remain in place throughout study. Video cameras can be used to record physical behaviors that occur while the subject is asleep. Typically, the unwanted sexual behaviors do not present on film and the majority of information is taken from a sleep study.

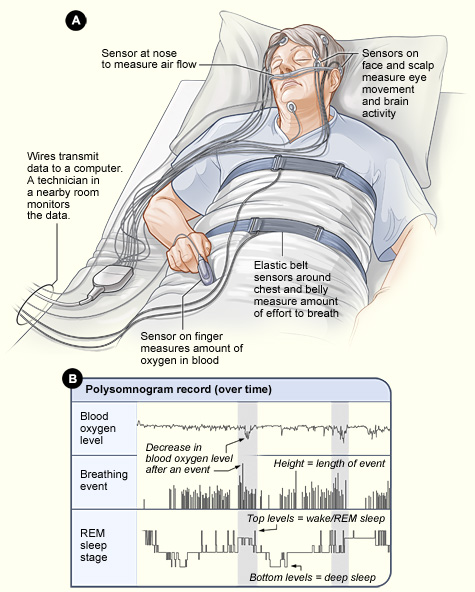
The image above depicts an individual undergoing a sleep study.

A PSG cannot determine a diagnosis every time it is performed, but can assist in determining what diagnoses should be considered or excluded. While PSG is a useful diagnostic tool, it cannot replace forensic examination. A PSG study may identify sexsomnia, but cannot determine whether it was responsible for an individual's actions or present during the time of an alleged crime. Likewise, the study may not identify sexsomnia, but that does not mean that the patient has never experienced it, so it is essential to collect information from as many sources as possible. This could include interviews with friends, family, and significant others, as well as medical records concerning the individual's sleep previous patterns.

Polysomnography is also used in the diagnosis of other sleep disorders such as obstructive sleep apnea, narcolepsy, and restless leg syndrome.

===== Body functions measured by a PSG =====
- inspiratory and expiratory air flow
- oxygen saturation in blood
- respiratory effort
- respiratory rate
- eye movements
- brain waves
- electrical activity in muscles
- position of body

== Prevention ==
Since there is not an FDA-approved medication on the market specifically designed for the treatment of sexsomnia, health professionals attempt to treat the disorder through a variety of approaches. Among the first line of prevention for sexsomnia involves creating and maintaining a safe environment for all who are affected as a result of the disorder. Precautionary measures include, but are not limited to, the individual in question sleeping in a separate bedroom and the installation of locks and alarms on doors.

== Treatment ==
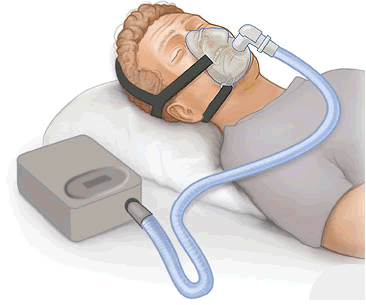
Pictured above is an individual wearing a CPAP device.

Treatment for sexsomnia involves one or more of the following:

- prescription medications
- CPAP
- lifestyle changes

=== Medications ===
Clonazepam has been prescribed as treatment for sexsomnia. This medication is classified as a benzodiazepine and works by acting on the GABA-A receptors present in the central nervous system (CNS). Benzodiazepines open the chloride channels to allow chloride to enter the neuron. The most common use of this medication is for the treatment of anxiety, seizures, panic disorders, and sleep disorders. Anticonvulsant therapy is used to treat sexual behaviors that result secondary to sleep related epilepsy.

=== CPAP ===
Continuous positive airway pressure is commonly used as a treatment for sleep apnea. In cases where the individual has both sleep apnea, and sexual behaviors consistent with sexsomnia, the implementation of a continuous positive airway pressure resulted in complete discontinuation of unwanted behaviors.

=== Lifestyle changes ===
Positive lifestyle changes are encouraged for individuals with sexsomnia. Reducing stress and anxiety triggers may reduce the likelihood of an exacerbation of the disorder. The use of open discussion and understanding between couples decrease the negative emotional feelings and stress felt and generates a support system.

== Research ==
Research findings for sexsomnia first appeared in 1996 publication by Colin Shapiro and Nik Trajanovic of the University of Toronto. In the most recent study of sexsomnia, 832 individuals were surveyed at a sleep disorder center. Among these individuals, 8% reported sexual behaviors consistent with sexsomnia, with men reporting three times more frequently than women.

== Society and culture ==
Sexsomnia has begun to gain attention through its exposure on television, news platforms, and social media outlets.

=== Media exposure ===
Articles regarding sexsomnia continue to circulate on Glamour.com, the Huffington Post, and Refinery29 among many others. Increased exposure has resulted in a conversation between those who have the disorder and those directly affected. Sexsomnia has also been featured in popular television series including House, MD, Law and Order: Special Victims Unit, and Desperate Housewives.

=== Legal cases ===
==== Sex offender controversies ====
A number of alleged sex offenders have claimed sexsomnia as the cause of their offenses. The Australasian Sleep Association has urged qualified physicians to contribute in expert testimony in such cases to ensure the individual's claims are valid and not just an attempt to be released of sexual offense charges.

==== Smith v. State ====
Smith v. State of Georgia officially established a separate affirmative defense for the unconscious. According to the defense, "A person who commits an act during unconsciousness or sleep has not committed a voluntary act and is not criminally responsible for the act." In order for the assault to be considered a crime by the State of Georgia, the accused must have voluntarily committed the act and exhibited intent to carry out the act.

==== Swedish man acquitted of rape with sexsomnia defense ====
Mikael Halvarsson was acquitted of rape in Sweden due to the sexsomnia defense. Charges were brought against Halvarsson after reports of sexual assault were filed by his girlfriend at the time. Upon investigation, Halvarsson was found still asleep in the alleged victim's bed when police arrived. During the appeal, a previous girlfriend of Halvarsson testified of similar behavior she had observed in the past, as well as his mother reporting unusual sleep behaviors beginning at a young age.

==== Rape trial dropped due to victim's supposed sexsomnia ====
In 2022, a case came to light in England, where an allegation of rape in 2017 was dropped in 2020 by the Crown Prosecution Service (CPS) due to expert opinion that the woman involved had sexsomnia, and so the male defendant may have believed that she was consenting, and was thus formally acquitted. The woman involved later appealed the decision. A chief crown prosecutor separate from the department that made the decision to close the case reviewed the evidence of the case again: he concluded that the case should have gone to court; that the expert opinions on sexsomnia should have been challenged in court; and that the decision to close the case was a mistake. The reviewing chief prosecutor apologised unreservedly to the woman when concluding the review. Despite the review, the case could not be reopened because the case had been formally closed and the defendant declared not guilty.

The woman received £35,000 in compensation after her rape case was dropped amid claims she could have had an episode of "sexsomnia". Kate Ellis, joint litigation lead at the Centre for Women’s Justice, said claims brought by victims against the CPS are legally "difficult", with payouts "extremely rare".

==== R v. Timothy Malcolm Rowland ====
Timothy Rowland of Sydney, Australia, was acquitted by a jury after successfully claiming a Sexsomnia defence.

In response to an Inquiry of Concern from the Jury, Judge J. Pickering instructed that: “No laws about that exist. There are no criminal offences about that that exist. And it’s not for you to create the law”, later commenting that “Someone could not be found guilty of a crime they did unconsciously”.

== See also ==
- Automatism
- Masturbation
- Nocturnal emission
- Parasomnia
- Sleep medicine
- Somnambulism
- Somniloquy
- Catathrenia
