= Gorm Wagner =

Danish sexologist (1930–2018)

Gorm Wagner (24 August 1930 – 24 July 2018) was a Danish sexologist.

== Life and career ==
Born on 24 August 1930, Wagner earned his medical degree at the University of Copenhagen in 1958, after which he completed a doctorate at the Institute for Advanced Study of Human Sexuality, and took an internship at the Trinity Lutheran Hospital in Kansas City, Missouri, United States, followed by a research position at Rockefeller University. Upon Wagner's return to Denmark, he sought further training in gynecology and obstetrics, and joined the Department of Physiology at the University of Copenhagen as a research assistant in 1964, where he was later named an associate professor. Wagner began his research in sexual medicine in the 1970s.

In 1978, Wagner and Adrian Zorgniotti founded the International Society for Impotence Research. Later Wagner founded the European Society for Impotence Research, which became a regional affiliate of the ISIR. Wagner led the ISIR as president from 1988 to 1994, and served in the same role for the ESIR in 1995. He was a founding co-editor of the International Journal of Impotence Research, alongside Bill Furlow, from 1989 to 2002. The ISIR later changed its name to the International Society for Sexual Medicine, and the ESIR became known as the European Society for Sexual Medicine. Following the name change, the ISSM founded four new journals, among them The Journal of Sexual Medicine and Sexual Medicine Reviews.

Wagner died on 24 July 2018.
