= MV.Health =

British-American Medical Device Company

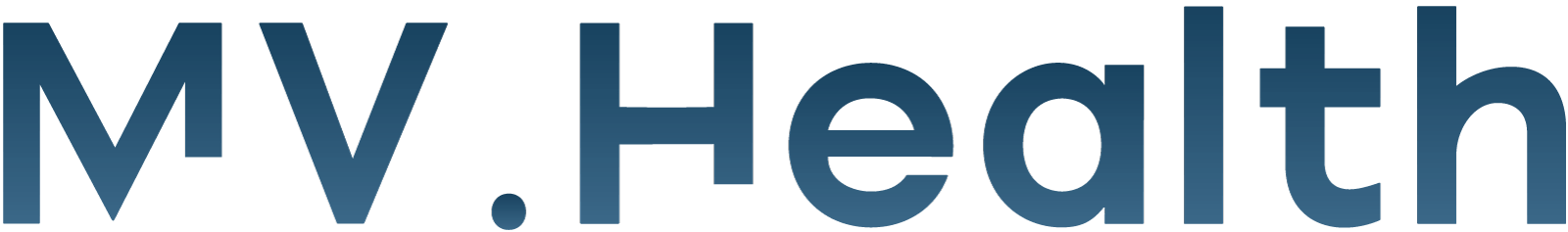
- Industry: Medical devices
- Founded: 2014
- Headquarters: London, New York, Los Angeles
- Key people: Dr. Soum Rakshit; Rob Weekly; Shanshan Xu; Prof. Prokar Dasgupta
- Website: mv.health

MV.Health is a British-American medical device company specialising in vibratory devices for sexual health and pelvic therapy. The company promotes its products as doctor-design and clinically validated.

In 2022, Femtech Insider reported MV.Health became the first brand to make vibrators eligible for purchase with U.S. Health Savings Accounts (HSA) and Flexible Spending Accounts (FSA), reflecting their recognition as medical devices.

In 2025, the New York Post reported that MV.Health's six FDA-registered devices were added to the U.S. Department of Veterans Affairs procurement system, making them fully reimbursable for veterans.

In 2026, they won the The King's Awards for Enterprise in Innovation for their prostate care device, Molto. According to The London Gazette, published by the Government of the United Kingdom, the award was given for their "ultra-slim flexible medical device to address prostate pain."

== History ==
Founded in London in 2014 by a team of biomedical engineers, the company initially focused on adaptive vibratory devices for pelvic pain. A 2023 Popular Science article noted its first six-motor vibrator became a certified medical device for pelvic floor pain.

== Research ==
The company's clinical leadership is headed by their Chief Medical Officer, Professor Prokar Dasgupta. In 2023, The Guardian described their laboratory as "the only facility conducting vibrator research and development within the UK". Peer-reviewed publications report the company's devices have been evaluated for various sexual dysfunctions such as Genito-Pelvic Pain, Vaginal Dryness, Vaginismus, Erectile Dysfunction and Prostatitis.

- A 2022 study in the Journal of Sexual Medicine reported improvements in pain scores among women with genito-pelvic pain penetration disorder who used a vibrating device.
- A 2025 study on psychogenic ED published in the International Journal of Impotence Research, reported IIEF-5 rising from 14.4 to 22.3, with EDITS satisfaction scores of 78%.
- A 2025 study on vaginismus by the NHS published in the Journal of Psychosexual Health reported mean FSFI Pain score improving from 1.40 to 3.36 for the Intervention group.

== Media coverage ==
MV.Health has been the subject of reporting in mainstream media. In 2023, The Guardian highlighted their Crescendo devices as "designed to target and release tender areas inside the vagina and alleviate pelvic pain". Popular Science profiled the company in the context of "medical devices for people with menopause, erectile dysfunction, and pelvic floor pain".

In 2024 their menopause-focused billboard campaign in New York City, was reported in Print Magazine as the "First-Ever US Billboard to Feature a Vibrator". In 2025, The Times noted the company's preparations for possible U.S. tariffs, including shifting manufacturing and stockpiling devices.

== Recognition ==
In 2018 the company's Crescendo vibrator was noted for winning a Design Week Award against Apple Watch. In 2025, MV.Health was ranked 14th in the Sunday Times Tech 100 list of fastest-growing private hardware companies. Financial Times Sifted placed it among the top three leanest startups in the UK/Ireland region. In 2026, they became a member of the Milken Institute Women's Health Network and a portfolio company of AgeTech Collaborative From AARP.
