= Sex and drugs =

Interaction between sex and drugs

Sex and drugs refers to the influence of substances on sexual function and experience. Sex and drugs date back to ancient humans and have been interlocked throughout human history. Sexual performance is known as the execution of the act of sex and the quality of sexual activity. This includes elements such as libido (a person's sexual drive), sexual function (including erection in males and vaginal lubrication in females), sensation (the ability to achieve orgasm). Drugs are termed as any chemical substance that produces a physiological and or psychological change in an organism. Drugs categorized as psychoactive drugs, antihypertensive drugs, antihistamines, cancer treatment, and hormone medication have a significant impact on sexual performance. Various drugs result in different effects, both positive and negative. Negative effects may include low libido, erection issues (in males), vaginal dryness (in females) and anorgasmia. Positive effects usually address these issues, overall enhancing sexual performance and contributing to a more enjoyable sexual experience. It is crucial to know that the impact of drugs on sexual performance varies among individuals, especially among different genders.

== Understanding sexual performance ==
Understanding sexual performance involves recognizing various factors that are responsible for a person's combined sexual experience and function. This includes libido, a person's overall sexual desire, and drive; sexual function, which encompasses the male's erectile function and a female's vaginal lubrication; and sensations, which in this context refers to a person's ability to have orgasms and/or ejaculations.

=== Libido ===
Libido is primarily regulated by the hypothalamus, where sex hormones (testosterone and estrogen), and neurotransmitters (dopamine, oxytocin and serotonin), are the main components that influence sex drive. A decreased libido is predominantly caused by low testosterone in males For females, serotonin acts as a inhibitor for sexual desire as it reduces the ability of stimulatory systems for sexual cues.

=== Sexual function ===
Diagram of the major divisions of the nervous system

Penile erection is a vascular event caused by the innervation of both autonomic (sympathetic and parasympathetic) and somatic nervous systems (sensory and motor). Sensory information is received from the genitals towards these nervous systems, in which neurotransmitters such as serotonin, dopamine, noradrenaline, and adrenaline would be released to control erectile function.

Vaginal dryness refers to the situation when the vagina lacks lubrication which leads to serious pain during sexual intercourse. The production of lubricants in the vagina are highly sensitive to changes in hormones such as estrogen and testosterone, that are also responsible for blood flow. Low estrogen and testosterone circulating in the body contributes to vaginal dryness.

=== Sensations ===
Orgasms are sensory phenomena that take place in the cerebral cortex with an association with the spinal reflex. Men can achieve orgasm through the penis, and can be categorised to two parts: emission and ejaculation. Neurotransmitters such as serotonin, norepinephrine and dopamine affect ejaculation in males the most. For women, orgasms are induced by stimulation of erotic sites, currently there are no definitive explanations on the chemical triggers for female orgasm.

== Disinhibition ==
Drugs are frequently associated with reduced sexual inhibition, both when used voluntarily in social circumstances, and involuntarily, as in the case of some date rape drugs. Because the use of drugs, including alcohol, is commonly presented as an excuse for risky or socially unacceptable behavior, it is necessary to treat the idea of a direct causal relation between drug use and unsafe sex with caution. Drugs may provide a socially acceptable excuse for engaging in sexual behaviors in which people may want to engage but perhaps feel that they should not.

== Sexual function ==
Some forms of sexual dysfunction such as erectile dysfunction can be treated with drugs. Because of their effects, erectile dysfunction drugs are sometimes used for recreational purposes. Many drugs, both legal and illegal, some sold online, have side effects that affect the user's sexual function. Many drugs can cause loss of libido as a side effect.

Since a partial cause of the refractory period is the inhibition of dopamine by an orgasm-induced secretion of prolactin, such potent dopamine receptor agonists as cabergoline may help achieve multiple orgasms as well as the retention of sexual arousal for longer periods of time.

== Sexual activity, drug use, and risks ==
According to some studies, up to 22.1% of teenagers abused substances during their most recent sexual experience.

Likewise, studies have shown adolescents who regularly abuse substances are more likely to initiate sexual activity at an earlier age, have a more significant number of sexual partners, and engage in unprotected sex more often.

Additionally, substance abuse has been linked to an increased risk of sexually transmitted infection (STI).

== Types of drugs that affect sexual performance ==
Drugs on the market provide both benefits and detrimental effects to the person, especially regarding sexual performance, depending on the use and dosage. Drugs are classified into different categories in respect to their functions, including psychoactive drugs, antihypertensive drugs, antihistamines, cancer treatment drugs and hormone medication.

=== Psychoactive drugs ===
Psychoactive drugs refer to chemical substances that affect an individual's mental processes, such as emotions, cognition, perception, and consciousness. These substances directly impact the central nervous system (CNS), which also has an impact on the neurophysiologic phases of sexual response. Antidepressants are a group of drugs that treat individuals with clinical depression, as well as other mental disorders. This group of drugs have shown to affect sexual functions in both male and females. Alcohol is a group of psychoactive substances where signals of pleasure, rewards are sent to the human brain. It also causes a series of adverse effects on the body, including the brain and the liver, leading to health problems and sexual dysfunction. Antipsychotics are drugs that treat mental disorders such as schizophrenia, and other psychoses. These drugs block certain pathways in humans that contribute to sexual dysfunction, including reduced arousal and sexual desire.

==== Alcohol ====
Alcohol inhibits neuronal excitability through acting on gamma-aminobutyric acid (GABA) receptors. Alcohol is often accessible in a number of social situations across many cultures and is frequently connected with uninhibited social activities. However, clinical research has produced mixed results about the effects of alcohol on libido in humans.

Some studies indicate that alcohol improves sexual behavior and desire, but other research indicates that alcohol impairs sexual function. The conditions under which the drinking occurs, laboratory research vs self-report studies from users, as well as the amounts of alcohol consumed, may contribute to these outcomes.

Laboratory studies have demonstrated that while low blood alcohol levels have no effect on or slightly enhance sexual arousal and responsiveness in men, elevated blood alcohol levels result in decreased erectile responsiveness, decreased arousal, and impaired ability to ejaculate. Other laboratory research, on the other hand, found no significant influence of either low or high blood alcohol levels on measures of arousal.

Even with mild alcohol use, women have decreased vaginal flow responses. In contrast, women self-report heightened sexual desire and pleasure when they consume more alcohol and are more likely to engage in sexual activities with someone when intoxicated.

Heavy alcohol intake impairs sexual and reproductive function, erectile, and ejaculatory dysfunction in males, and sexual arousal, interest, and orgasm in women.

Although alcohol may have varying impacts on sexual performance depending on the amount drank, it generally impairs sexual functioning and contributes to increased sexual risk taking.

==== Antidepressants ====
Psychiatrists and doctors commonly prescribe different types of antidepressants to patients. SSRIs, SNRIs, and NDRIs are the most common types of antidepressants. Each has slightly different effects on sexual functioning, but generally, it has been found that antidepressants can delay/decrease orgasms. Dapoxetine in particular takes advantage of the side effect of delayed orgasm and is approved specifically as a medication for the treatment of premature ejaculation rather than as an antidepressant.

The side effects on sexual functioning can impact mental health and quality of life. However, the decrease in depressive symptoms from antidepressants make it worth the sexual side effects for many people. They can be managed by changing the dose, switching drugs, or taking "antidotes". Maca, a plant that grows in central Peru, aids with sexual dysfunction caused by antidepressant drugs for women. There are specific Maca products that can also increase sexual desire in men.

=== 2C-B ===
2C-B was first sold commercially in 5 mg pills as a purported aphrodisiac under the trade name "Erox", which was manufactured by the German pharmaceutical company Drittewelle. While being primarily a psychedelic it is also a mild entactogen. 5-MeO-MiPT is another psychedelic that some users find to be euphoric and tactile in low to moderate doses of 4-8 milligrams.

=== Antihypertensive drugs ===
Antihypertensive drugs are a group of drugs that prevent, control and treat hypertension. Hypertension imposes negative sexual effects on both men and women, where antihypertensive drugs help alleviate erectile dysfunction in men.

=== Antihistamines ===
Antihistamines are used for relieving symptoms of allergies and hay fever. Antihistamines may cause a drying effect of the mouth, nose and throat but can also cause a drying effect on other parts of the body, such as the vagina, decreasing moisture and lubrication.

=== Cancer treatment ===
There are a variety of treatment types for cancer, depending on the cancer type. The therapies for treating cancer vary, including hormone therapy, medications that treat pain, depression, nerves and blood vessels. These therapies will affect one's sexual desire and pose possible consequences on sexual response.

=== Hormone medications ===
Hormone therapy directs its treatment towards hormones in the body, including reproductive hormones. One type is hormonal replacement therapy (HRT), which is used to supply menopausal women that lack estrogen and progesterone, increasing vaginal lubrication. Another type is testosterone replacement therapy, which treats men with hypogonadism and it helps increase libido. On the contractionary, selective estrogen receptor modulators (SERMs) lead to a drop in oestrogen levels that would cause vaginal dryness.

=== Amphetamines ===
Amphetamines may lead to an increase in sexual drive and delay in orgasm.

=== Cocaine ===
Cocaine is a potent psycho-stimulant that boosts dopamine levels by inhibiting dopamine transporters. It has been often linked to enhanced libido and risk-taking behavior in humans.

Cocaine has been observed to increase sexual arousal or to trigger spontaneous erections and orgasms.

In contrast, other data has shown that persistent cocaine use impairs sexual desire and the capacity of both men and women to achieve orgasm.

=== Cannabis ===
Cannabis is the most commonly used illicit substance. Studies on cannabis and sex have shown that THC has been linked to improved sexual desire and function. Specifically, in one study, 70 percent of users said marijuana was an aphrodisiac, and 81 percent said it improved their sexual pleasure and satisfaction.

Other research has found that long-term marijuana use lowers testosterone levels and other reproductive hormones, causing erectile dysfunction in males.

=== MDMA ===
MDMA or "ecstasy" originally gained popularity in the 1980s among college students. According to a survey conducted, 10% of college students at a big US institution reported using MDMA, with alcohol and marijuana being the most often used substances. MDMA users report increased enjoyment in physical contact and proximity rather than a sexual experience. MDMA has been shown to impair sexual performance, including erectile dysfunction and delayed orgasm, as well as to suppress sex desire.

=== Opioids ===
Opioids (also known as narcotics) such as morphine and heroin attach to opioid receptors in the brain. These substances have long been known to inhibit sexual behavior.

Similar to the effects of psycho-stimulants, both men and women who use heroin report engaging in high-risk sexual practices. [{Source?}]

Subjects typically report having several sexual partners, using condoms seldom or not at all, and having a high frequency of STI diagnosis.

While small doses of heroin may enhance sexual desire and performance, chronic opiate use, including methadone and buprenorphine, synthetic and semi-synthetic opiates prescribed for opiate addiction treatment, results in decreased sexual desire, response, and orgasms for both men and women, as well as erectile, ejaculatory dysfunction, and vaginismus.

== Positive effects of drugs on sexual performance ==
=== Increased libido ===
Sildenafil 100 milligram tablets

Libido refers to a person's overall sexual desire and drive. Since low testosterone levels are associated with low sexual desire, testosterone replacement therapy can be prescribed for increasing testosterone in the body, increasing libido and restoring hormonal balance. While Phosphodiesterase-5 (PDE5) inhibitors such as sildenafil, tadalafil, vardenafil, and avanafil are primarily known for treating erectile dysfunction, it also has a positive effect on libido.

Flibanserin is a drug that is both a serotonin antagonist and agonist that treats hypoactive sexual desire disorder (HSDD) for premenopausal women. The drug acts as antagonist and agonist on two different receptors. The binding of flibanserin causes downstream release of dopamine and noradrenaline and reduces the production of serotonin, increasing sex drive. However, currently there is still no evidence that this drug would enhance sexual performance, therefore this drug still needs to be further investigated.

=== Increased sexual function ===
For males, several drugs increases the blood flow to the penis which allows for the achievement and maintenance of an erection. Phosphodiesterase-5 (PDE5) inhibitors are widely known and commonly prescribed for erectile dysfunction. PDE5 enzymes are blocked by PDE5 inhibitors to prevent their function, this allows for the relaxation of penile blood vessels and muscles, facilitating increased blood circulation to the penis. Alprostadil injections as a vasodilator are also used for the treatment of erectile dysfunction, expanding blood vessels that result in increasing blood flow to the penis.

For females, vaginal lubricant production can be increased by hormone replacement therapy (HRT) medicine such as vaginal estrogen. Vaginal dryness results from a declined level in circulating estrogen within the body, most likely during menopause. Treatment for vaginal dryness typically involves the use of localised estrogen, such as HRT medicine. This drug works by increasing estrogen in the body circulation, thereby enhancing lubrication production in the vaginal area.

=== Achieving orgasm ===
Delayed ejaculation, a type of male sexual disorder that is characterised by the delay of ejaculation or inability to achieve ejaculation. There are no approved drugs for the treatment of delayed ejaculation as of now, The majority of medications used for treating delayed ejaculation are primarily intended for treating different medical conditions. Amantadine, a Parkinson's medication, is known to enhance dopamine agonist release and activate dopamine receptors, which helps with ejaculation. However, there is not sufficient evidence to support the effectiveness of these medications on delayed ejaculation.

== Negative effects of drugs on sexual performance ==
=== Decreased libido ===
Several common medications can contribute to low libido. Antidepressants, especially selective serotonin reuptake inhibitors (SSRIs) and serotonin-norepinephrine reuptake inhibitors (SNRIs) antidepressants, increase serotonin levels that decrease testosterone, leading to a decrease in libido. Antipsychotic drugs create blockages of dopamine D2 receptors that are responsible for dopamine production can lead to a low libido. Additionally, these drugs can increase production of prolactin in males which contribute to lower levels of testosterone. Chemotherapy drugs also lead to a decrease in testosterone but it is only temporary during the course of therapy.

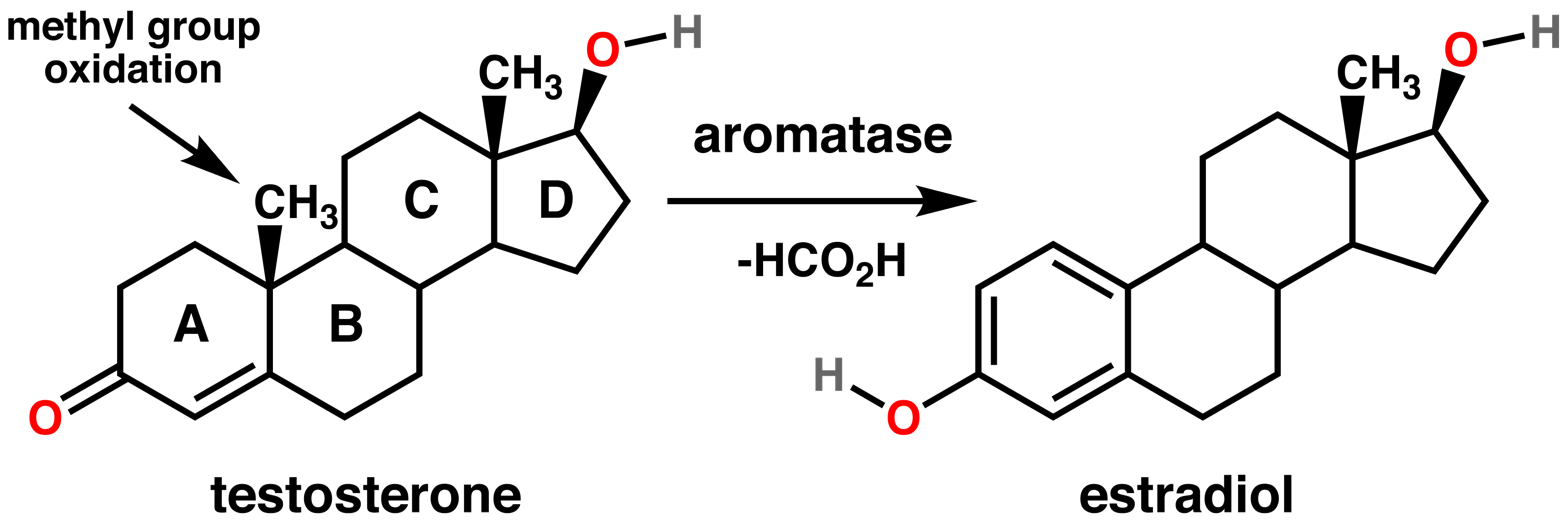
Conversion of testosterone to estradiol by aromatase

Drinking large amounts of alcohol regularly can lead to low libido due to a process called aromatisation. This process refers to the conversion of testosterone or its precursors into estrogen, leading to a decrease in testosterone levels in circulation.

=== Decreased sexual function ===
Impotence refers to the inability of a male's penis to become erect for sexual intercourse, in which the male is not able to get or maintain an erection. The medical term for this phenomenon is erectile dysfunction. Drugs such as antihypertensives including thiazide diuretics, loop diuretics, and beta-blockers used for lowering blood pressure limiting blood flow to the penis area, making it difficult to get or maintain an erection. The antidepressants SSRIs, SNRIS, tricyclics, tetracyclics, and others can also cause impotence. Direct effects caused by antihypertensives on the penile vascular smooth muscle lead to vasoconstriction which leads to impaired perfusion. Antipsychotic drugs are also responsible for several mechanisms that lead to erectile dysfunction. Mechanisms such as acetylcholine receptor antagonism and alpha-adrenergic receptor antagonism reduces periphery vasodilation, inducing erectile dysfunction.

Overindulgence in alcohol may also cause temporary inability to achieve an erection. Alcohol, being a diuretic, can cause a person to urinate more frequently, resulting in dehydration. Dehydration reduces the volume of blood in the body, consequently decreasing blood flow towards the penis Additionally, dehydration also increases angiotensin levels in the body, which is a hormone associated with erectile dysfunction.

Birth control pills affect hormone levels in the body such as a decrease in estrogen, leading to vaginal dryness by thinning and shrinking of the vaginal tissue. Moreover, SERMs such as Evista and Tamoxifen which are used to treat breast cancer, results in vaginal dryness.

Antihistamines narrow blood vessels, leading to lowering of moisture levels as well as mucous production, which includes lubricant production in the vagina. Anti-hypertensive drugs help reduce blood pressure by decreasing blood flow to organs in the body, resulting in decreased vaginal lubrication as well.

=== Reduced sensations ===
Antidepressants, particularly SSRIs and SNRIs, cause delayed ejaculation and orgasm due to its function of retaining serotonin, which inhibits ejaculation. Similarly, antipsychotics also contribute to delayed ejaculation by affecting dopamine transporters, where dopamine plays a role in ejaculation via D2 receptors.

SSRIs, SNRIs and some tri- and tetracyclic and other antidepressants inhibit reuptake of serotonin, thereby increasing serotonin in the body and decreasing their ability to produce lubricant in the vagina. It has been reported that around 42% of women that intake this type of medication have problems with orgasm production. Other medications such as antipsychotic drugs also reported signs of impaired orgasm.

Intake of too much alcohol can potentially cause depressant effects on the CNS. These effects contribute to sensory dullness, which leads to a delay effect on orgasm and ejaculation.

== Date rape drugs ==
A date rape drug is any drug that is an incapacitating agent which—when administered to another person—incapacitates the person and renders them vulnerable to a drug-facilitated sexual assault (DFSA), including rape. One of the most common types of DFSA are those in which a victim consumes a recreational drug such as alcohol that was administered surreptitiously. The other most common form of DFSA involves the non-surreptitiously administered consumption of alcohol. Here, the victims in these cases are drinking voluntarily which then makes them unable to make informed decisions or give consent.

== Society and culture ==
=== Chemsex ===
Party and play, or chemsex, is the consumption of drugs to facilitate sexual activity. Sociologically, both terms refer to a subculture of recreational drug users who engage in high-risk sexual activities under the influence of drugs within groups. The term PnP is commonly used by gay men and other men who have sex with men (MSM) in North America, while chemsex is more associated with the gay scene in Europe. The drug of choice is typically methamphetamine, known as tina or T, but other drugs are also used, such as mephedrone, GHB, GBL and alkyl nitrites (known as poppers).

=== Contraception and abortion ===
Drug-based contraception has been available since the development of the contraceptive pill. As well as their contraceptive effects, contraceptive drugs can also have adverse sexual and reproductive side-effects. Prior to the availability of effective contraceptives, some substances were also used as abortifacients to terminate pregnancy; medical abortion exists as a modern medical practice.

== See also ==
- Abortifacient
- Aphrodisiac
- Date rape drug
- Hormonal contraception
- Libido § Medications
- Methamphetamine and sex
- Nitrite inhalants
- Party and play
- Sex and alcohol
- Sex and Drugs and Rock and Roll
- Wine, women, and song
