= ISSM =

ISSM may refer to:

- International Society for Sexual Medicine
- International Swaminarayan Satsang Mandal
- Ice Sheet System Model, an Ice-sheet model
