= Sexual medicine =

Branch of medicine

Sexual medicine or psychosexual medicine as defined by Masters and Johnsons in their classic Textbook of Sexual Medicine, is "that branch of medicine that focuses on the evaluation and treatment of sexual disorders, which have a high prevalence rate." Examples of disorders treated with sexual medicine are erectile dysfunction, hypogonadism, and prostate cancer. Sexual medicine often uses a multidisciplinary approach involving physicians, mental health professionals, social workers, and sex therapists. Sexual medicine physicians often approach treatment with medicine and surgery, while sex therapists often focus on behavioral treatments.

While literature on the prevalence of sexual dysfunction is very limited especially in women, about 31% of women report at least one sexual dysfunction regardless of age. About 43% of men report at least one sexual dysfunction, and most increase with age except for premature ejaculation.

== Scope ==
Sexual medicine addresses issues of sexual dysfunction, sex education, disorders of sex development, sexually transmitted infections, puberty, and diseases of the reproductive system. The field connects to multiple medical disciplines with varying degrees of overlap including reproductive medicine, urology, psychiatry, genetics, gynaecology, andrology, endocrinology, and primary care.

However, sexual medicine differs from reproductive medicine in that sexual medicine addresses disorders of the sexual organs or psyche as it relates to sexual pleasure, mental health, and well-being, while reproductive medicine addresses disorders of organs that affect reproductive potential.

== History ==
The concept of sexual medicine did not arise in North America until the latter half of the 20th century, specifically around the time of the sexual revolution during the 1960s and 70s where the baby boomer generation had an increase in birth control pill use. Prior to that, open discussion of sex was seen as taboo. Psychoanalytic theories about sexuality, such as those proposed by Sigmund Freud and Helene Deutsch, were considered highly controversial. It was not until the post-World War II baby boom era and the sexual revolution of the 1960s and 1970s that sex, and subsequently sexual disorders, became a more accepted topic of discussion.

In fact, urologists were the first medical specialty to practice sexual medicine. Not only does their practice focus on the urinary tract (the kidneys, urinary bladder, and urethra), there is a large emphasis on male reproductive organs and male fertility. Today, sexual medicine has reached a wider range of medical specialties, as well as psychologists and social workers, to name a few.

What really opened the doors for societal normalcy of sexual medicine was the Massachusetts Male Aging Study performed in 1994 that clearly defined erectile dysfunction (ED) as a condition that affects a large population of American males. It also had reported that, if possible, men would be willing to improve their sexual performance if a medication was deemed to be safe. On March 27, 1998, sildenafil citrate was approved by the Food and Drug Administration (FDA) for the treatment of ED. The approval of Sildenafil transformed the way America talked about a topic that was once very private before.

== Diagnosis ==
Sexual medicine plays a role in a wide range of medical specialties, from a primary care provider to a sexual health physician to a sexologist. A physician's role in taking a sexual history is vital in diagnosing someone who presents with a sexual dysfunction.

There is some anxiety that arises when sex comes up for discussion, especially between a healthcare provider and an individual. It is reported that only 35% of primary care physicians have taken a sexual history and, due to this, there is a gap in achieving holistic healthcare. Clinicians fear individuals are not willing to share information, but in reality, it may be that the provider is shying away from the discussion. This steering away can be a result of lack of training, lack of structured tools and knowledge to assess a sexual history, and fears of offending individuals they are treating. Thus, knowing how to take an objective sexual history can help a clinician narrow down the pathogenesis of an individual's sexual health problem.

Issues related to sexual or reproductive medicine may be inhibited by a reluctance of an individual to disclose intimate or uncomfortable information. Even if such an issue is on an individual's mind, it is important that the physician initiates the subject. Some familiarity with the doctor generally makes it easier for people to talk about intimate issues such as sexual subjects, but for some people, a very high degree of familiarity may make an individual reluctant to reveal such intimate issues. When visiting a health care provider about sexual issues, having both partners of a couple present is often necessary, and is typically a good thing, but may also prevent the disclosure of certain subjects, and, according to one report, increases the stress level.

Taking a sexual history is an important component of sexual medicine when diagnosing an individual with a sexual dysfunction. A sexual history incorporates social, medical, and surgical information, and should touch on all factors that affect an individual's sexuality. Essentially, it is a conversation between a health care provider and an individual that is geared towards obtaining information about the person's sexual health status. If this is done properly, it will be easier for the physician to address concerns the individual may have. Some people may not be comfortable in sharing information, but it is the role of the physician to create a comfortable and non-judgemental, private environment for those they are working with to speak openly.

Sexual dysfunctions in men are often associated with testosterone deficiency. Signs and symptoms of testosterone deficiencies vary in each individual. Therefore, physical examinations could be done for men who suspect testosterone deficiencies to identify physical signs of the disorder. Common physical signs include fatigue, increased body fat, weight gain, muscle weakness, and depressed mood.

Laboratory tests may also be used to assist with diagnosis, such as blood glucose levels, lipid panel, and hormonal profile. Additionally, diagnostic categories of sexual disorders are listed in both the ICD-10 and DSM-5. ICD-10 categorizes the disorders by sexual desire, sexual arousal, orgasm, and sexual pain, while DSM-5 categorizes the dysfunctions by gender, substance/medication induced, paraphilic, or gender dysphoria.

== Risk factors for sexual dysfunction ==
The risk of developing a sexual dysfunction increases with age in both men and women. There are several risk factors that are associated with sexual dysfunction in both men and women. Cardiovascular disease, diabetes mellitus, genitourinary disease, psychological/psychiatric disorders, and presence of a chronic disease are all common risk factors for developing a sexual dysfunction. Endothelial dysfunction is a risk factor that is specifically associated with erectile dysfunction. Past family medical history of sexual dysfunction disorders are also a risk factor for development.

Sociocultural factors may also contribute to sexual problems, such as personal, religious, or cultural beliefs about sex. Personal well-being may also impact an individual's sexual activity. Stress and fatigue may contribute to developing a decreased sexual response or interest. Fatigue may result from poor sleep or another underlying medical problem. Current or past sexual abuse, whether physical or emotional, is also a risk factor for developing sexual problems.

== Disorders of sexual function ==
Sexual dysfunctions are sexual problems that are continuous in a person's life, adding stress and difficulty to personal relationships. Congenital or acquired, these conditions refer to any pathology which interferes with the perception of satisfactory sexual health. Varied conditions include absent sexual organs, hermaphrodite and other genetic malformations, or trauma such as amputation or lacerations.

Examples of conditions which may be treated by specialists in this field include:

Female

- Vaginismus
- Genito-pelvic pain-penetration disorder
- Vulvodynia
- Imperforate hymen
- Vaginal septum
- Vaginitis
- Endometriosis
- Atrophic vaginitis
- Vaginal yeast infection
- Pelvic floor dysfunction

Male

- Premature ejaculation
- Delayed ejaculation
- Erectile dysfunction
- Retrograde ejaculation
- Anejaculation
- Hard Flaccid Syndrome

Non-exclusive

- Lack or loss of sexual desire (Libido)
- Hypoactive sexual desire disorder
- Lack of sexual enjoyment
- Sexual arousal disorder
- Failure of sexual response
- Anorgasmia
- Hypersexuality
- Dyspareunia
- Substance or medication induced sexual dysfunction
- Painful orgasm
- Chronic pelvic pain
- Sexually transmitted infection
- Hypogonadism
- Sexuality issues
- Pelvic floor dysfunction

== Treatment ==
Once a diagnosis of sexual dysfunction has been made, treatment is often integrative and individualized. Sexual medicine experts aim to discover both the physical and psychologic factors that are the cause of an individual's sexual dysfunction.

=== Male sexual dysfunction ===
The most common male sexual dysfunction disorders are erectile dysfunction (ED), low libido, and ejaculatory dysfunction.

Once etiology and cardiovascular risk factors for ED have been identified, lifestyle or non-pharmacological therapy can be initiated to mitigate risk factors. As of 2018, the American Urological Association (AUA) ED guidelines recommend shared medical decision-making between patient and provider over first-, second-. and third-line therapies. However, phosphodiesterase-5 (PDE5) inhibitors, such as sildenafil (Viagra) and tadalafil (Cialis), are often recommended due to their favorable efficacy and side effect profile and work by increasing the lifespan of the vasodilator nitric oxide in the corpus cavernosum. Alternative treatments for ED are the use of vacuum-assisted erection devices, intracavernosal injection or intraurethral administration of alprostadil (prostaglandin E1), and surgery if necessary.

Treatment for decreased libido is often directed towards the cause of the low libido. Low levels of hormones such as testosterone, serum prolactin, TSH, and estradiol can be associated with low libido, and thus hormone replacement therapy is often used to restore the levels of these hormones in the body. Low libido can also be secondary to use of medications such as selective serotonin reuptake inhibitors (SSRIs), and so reduction of dose of the SSRI is used to improve libido. Additionally, low libido due to psychological causes is often approached with psychotherapy.

Similarly, treatment of ejaculatory dysfunction such as premature ejaculation is dependent on the etiology. SSRIs, topical anesthetics, and psychotherapy are commonly used to treat premature ejaculation.

=== Female sexual dysfunction ===
Similar to male sexual dysfunctions, sexual problems in women are also prevalent; however, they differ in the kind of dysfunction. For example, males have more problems related to function of their reproductive organs, where as for women it is more common to experience psychological problems, like lack of a sexual desire and more pain related to sexual activity. In 2008, 40% of U.S. women reported they were experiencing low sexual desire.

Treatment approach is dependent on the type of dysfunction the women is experiencing.

The treatment of female sexual dysfunction is varied as multiple causes are often identified. Following evaluation of symptoms and diagnosis, the woman's goals for treatment are determined and used to track progress. Health professionals are also trained to include the woman's sexual partner in the treatment plan, including noting any sexual dysfunction of the partner. Referral of the woman or couple to a sex therapist is also common to increase communication and expression of concerns and desires. Finally, conditions associated with the documented sexual dysfunction are simultaneously treated and included in the treatment plan.

Non-pharmacologic treatment for female sexual dysfunction can include lifestyle modifications, biofeedback, and physical therapy. Pharmacologic therapy can include topical treatments, hormone therapy, antidepressants, and muscle relaxants.

In fact, low sexual desire is the most common sexual problem for women at any age. With this, sexual ideas and thoughts are also absent. Counseling sessions addressing changes the couple can make can improve a woman's sexual desire.

Sexual pain is another large factor for women, caused by Genitourinary Syndrome of Menopause (GSM), which includes hypoestrogenic vulvovaginal atrophy, provoked pelvic floor hypertonus, and vulvodynia. These can all be treated with lubricants and moisturizers, estrogen, and ospemifene.

=== Psychiatric barriers ===
Sexual disorders are common in individuals with psychiatric disorders. Depression and anxiety disorders are strongly connected with reduced sex drive and a lack of sexual enjoyment. These individuals experience a decreased sexual desire and sexual aversion. Bipolar disorder, schizophrenia, obsessive–compulsive personality disorder, and eating disorders, are all associated with an increased risk of sexual dysfunction and dissatisfaction of sexual activity. Many factors can induce sexual dysfunction in individuals with psychiatric disorders, such as the effects of antipsychotics and antidepressants. Treatment may include switching medications to one with less sexual dysfunction side effects, decreasing the dose of the medication to decrease these side effects, or psychiatric counseling therapy.

=== Lifestyle barriers ===
General health greatly relates to sexual health in both males and females. Sexual medicine specialists take into consideration unhealthy lifestyle habits that may contribute to the sexual quality of life of individuals who are experiencing sexual dysfunction. Obesity, tobacco smoking, alcohol, substance abuse, and chronic stress are all lifestyle factors that may have negative impacts on sexual health and can lead to the development of sexual dysfunctions. Both obesity and tobacco smoking have negative impacts on cardiovascular and metabolic function, which contributes to the development of sexual dysfunctions. Chronic smoking causes erectile dysfunction in men due to a decrease in vasodilation of vascular endothelial tissue. Alcohol dependence can lead to erectile dysfunction in mend and reduced vaginal lubrication in women. Long term substance abuse of multiple recreational drugs (MDMA, cocaine, heroin, amphetamine), leads to a decrease in sexual desire, inability to achieve orgasm, and a reduction of sexual satisfaction. Chronic stress may potentially contribute to sexual dysfunction, as it can induce high levels of cortisol, which may cause harmful effects in if it remains altered long term. High levels of cortisol have been shown to cause a reduction in gonadic steroids and adrenal androgens. Studies have shown that these steroids and adrenal androgens have effects on genital arousal as well as sexual desire.

Sexual medicine experts are responsible for promoting healthy lifestyle habits in order to help prevent sexual dissatisfaction. Adoption of healthy lifestyle routines include: avoiding drugs, smoke, and excessive alcohol, as well as incorporating regular physical activity accompanied by a balanced diet and use of stress-management strategies. These habits can be proposed before trying to incorporate pharmacological therapies and/or psychiatric therapies.

== Sexual dysfunction in transgender persons ==
Limited research has been performed on sexual dysfunction in those who are transgender, but preliminary research suggests that initiating a sexual relationship is difficult for some. One recent study published in the Journal of Sexual Medicine surveyed 518 transgender individuals about sexual dysfunction and disturbances and reported that difficulty initiating sexual encounters and difficulties achieving orgasm were the most prevalent sexual dysfunctions experienced in the study sample.

== Challenges ==
While the awareness of sexual health importance has increased in regards to individuals' general health and well-being, there is still a taboo that follows sexual health. The perception of sexual health varies among different cultures, as the notion is tied with many cultural norms, religion, laws, traditions, and many more. Sexual medicine is a unique component of the medical practice that has its own challenges. The main obstacle that stands between these discussions have been reported as the lack of education regarding sexual issues in individuals. The discussion of sexual health and taking a sexual history faces barriers as physicians infrequently address these topics in visits, and individuals are reluctant to discuss openly due to the perception that it is the physician's duty to initiate the topic and fears that the conversation will make the physician uncomfortable.

Another challenge in sexual medicine is that in a standard process of drug discovery and development, human tissue and cells are not used in testing the candidate drug. Instead, animal models are often used to study sexual function, pathophysiology of diseases that cause sexual dysfunction, and new drugs. Pharmacokinetic and pharmacodynamic relationships are studied in animal models to test the safety and efficacy of candidate drugs. With animal models, there is a limitation to understanding sexual dysfunction and sexual medicine, as the results achieved can only mount to predictions.

Identification and treatment of female sexual dysfunctions are also a challenge as women often encounter difficulty within multiple disorders and sexual phases. The various sexual phases that are encompassed within female sexual dysfunctions (FSD) include hypoactive sexual desire disorder (HSDD), female sexual arousal disorder (FSAD), female orgasmic disorder (FOD) and female sexual pain disorders (FPD). Because many of these domains overlap, it is difficult to identify the target of treatment and many limitations are placed in the approach for research. Risk factors for female sexual dysfunctions were observed to be embedded with biopsychosocial aspects in epidemiological studies such as depression, urinary tract symptoms, cancer and cancer treatment, relationship problems, and menopausal transition. As a result, a multidimensional approach must be taken in the identification and treatment of female sexual dysfunctions.

The issue of psychological dilemmas that are associated with sexual dysfunctions is another challenge that is faced in sexual medicine. There are many psychological aspects that are tied in with sexual dysfunctions. Despite much of sex therapy originating from psychological and cognitive-behavioral practices, many of the psychological dynamics have been lost in the sexual medicine protocols. Approaching from a psychological and existential perspective helps link the understanding between sexual function and sexual dysfunction in the individual. Because the psychological aspects underneath the sexual distress are not being addressed within sexual therapy and treatments are mostly focused on the specific symptoms in sexual medicine, there are many situations where individuals still experience disappointment and dissatisfaction within sexual activities despite the dysfunction being resolved.

== See also ==
- Reproductive medicine
- Sexology
- Urology
