= Intravaginal ejaculation latency time =

Sexual health concept

Intravaginal ejaculation latency time (IELT) is the time it takes to ejaculate during vaginal intercourse. Average IELT varies between men. Age and sexual experience affect latency time, along with alcohol and some medications such as selective serotonin reuptake inhibitors (SSRIs). IELT is part of perceptions of sexual performance and actual satisfaction, which are also influenced by many other factors. Assessing IELT is part of diagnosing and treating conditions such as premature ejaculation.

== Studies ==
In 1991, scholars from the Kinsey Institute stated, "The truth is that the time between penetration and ejaculation varies not only from man to man, but from one time to the next for the same man." They added that the appropriate length for sexual intercourse is the length of time it takes for both partners to be mutually satisfied. A 2008 survey of Canadian and American sex therapists stated that the average time for heterosexual intercourse (coitus) was 7 minutes, and that 1 to 2 minutes was too short, 3 to 7 minutes was adequate and 7 to 13 minutes desirable, while 13 to 30 minutes was too long.

A study published in 2005 surveyed the IELT of 491 men in stable heterosexual relationships in the Netherlands, Spain, Turkey, UK, and US. Over a four-week period, couples recorded IELT data using a stopwatch and noted condom use. Median IELT was independent of condom use. Median IELT decreased with age (18–30: 6.5 minutes, 31–50: 5.4 minutes, above 51: 4.3 minutes). Median IELT for all participants was 5.4 minutes. Median IELT varied significantly by individual, with 14% of men under 3:20 and 26% of men over 10:00. Potential issues with the study included total sample size, small sample size per country, too few observations for each participant, and psychological effects of using a stopwatch.

== Effect of substances ==
Alcohol and opioids (such as heroin, morphine, and oxycodone) depress the central nervous system, prolonging the IELT. Alcohol consumption before sex can contribute to premature ejaculation or delayed ejaculation. Men with alcohol and opioid dependence have higher rates of sexual dysfunction, including premature ejaculation and delayed ejaculation, compared to the general population.

Studies of the neurophysiological process of ejaculation have found that serotonin transmission plays a role. Selective serotonin reuptake inhibitors (SSRIs) delay ejaculation, and SSRIs such as dapoxetine and sertraline are prescribed to treat premature ejaculation.

== See also ==
- Delayed ejaculation
- Human sexual response cycle
- Orgasm
- Premature ejaculation
- Refractory period (sex)
