= Chemsex (film) =

2015 film

- British release poster
- Directed by: William Fairman; Max Gogarty
- Produced by: William Fairman; Max Gogarty
- Cinematography: William Fairman
- Music by: Daniel Harle
- Distributed by: Peccadillo Pictures
- Release dates: 16 October 2015 (London Film Festival); 4 December 2015
- Running time: 83 minutes
- Country: United Kingdom
- Language: English

Chemsex is a 2015 British documentary film about gay men engaging in chemsex in London, England. The film was directed and produced by William Fairman and Max Gogarty for Vice Media.

== Release ==
Chemsex had a theatrical release on 4 December 2015 and was released on DVD on 11 January 2016.

== Reception ==
According to critic aggregation site Rotten Tomatoes, the film has a critic score of 95% with the critical consensus of; "a bleak, disturbing and unforgettably frank portrait of a subculture on the edge".
