= Sexual dysfunction =

Difficulty experienced by humans during any stage of normal sexual activity

- Other names: Sexual malfunction, sexual disorder
- Specialty: Sexology, gynecology, andrology

Sexual dysfunction is difficulty experienced by an individual or partners during any stage of normal sexual activity, including physical pleasure, desire, preference, arousal, or orgasm. The World Health Organization defines sexual dysfunction as a "person's inability to participate in a sexual relationship as they would wish". This definition is broad and is subject to many interpretations. A diagnosis of sexual dysfunction under the DSM-5 requires a person to feel extreme distress and interpersonal strain for a minimum of six months (except for substance- or medication-induced sexual dysfunction). Sexual dysfunction can have a profound impact on an individual's perceived quality of sexual life. The term sexual disorder may not only refer to physical sexual dysfunction, but to paraphilias as well; this is sometimes termed disorder of sexual preference.

A thorough sexual history and assessment of general health and other sexual problems (if any) are important when assessing sexual dysfunction, because it is usually correlated with other psychiatric issues, such as mood disorders, eating and anxiety disorders, and schizophrenia. Assessing performance anxiety, guilt, stress, and worry are integral to the optimal management of sexual dysfunction. Many of the sexual dysfunctions that are defined are based on the human sexual response cycle proposed by William H. Masters and Virginia E. Johnson, and modified by Helen Singer Kaplan.

== Types ==
Sexual dysfunction can be classified into four categories: sexual desire disorders, arousal disorders, orgasm disorders, and pain disorders. Dysfunction among men and women is studied in the fields of andrology and gynecology respectively.

=== Sexual desire disorders ===
Sexual desire disorders or decreased libido are characterized by a lack of sexual desire, libido for sexual activity, or sexual fantasies for some time. The condition ranges from a general lack of sexual desire to a lack of sexual desire for the current partner. The condition may start after a period of normal sexual functioning, or the person may always have had an absence or a lesser intensity of sexual desire.

The causes vary considerably but include a decrease in the production of normal estrogen in women, or testosterone in both men and women. Other causes may be aging, fatigue, pregnancy, medications (such as SSRIs), or psychiatric conditions, such as depression and anxiety. While many causes of low sexual desire are cited, only a few of these have ever been the object of empirical research.

=== Sexual arousal disorders ===
Sexual arousal disorders were previously known as frigidity in women and impotence in men, though these have now been replaced with less judgmental terms. Impotence is now known as erectile dysfunction, and frigidity has been replaced with a number of terms describing specific problems that can be broken down into four categories as described by the American Psychiatric Association's Diagnostic and Statistical Manual of Mental Disorders: lack of desire, lack of arousal, pain during intercourse, and lack of orgasm.

For both men and women, these conditions can manifest themselves as an aversion to and avoidance of sexual contact with a partner. In men, there may be partial or complete failure to attain or maintain an erection, or a lack of sexual excitement and pleasure in sexual activity.

There may be physiological origins to these disorders, such as decreased blood flow or lack of vaginal lubrication. Chronic disease and the partners' relationship can also contribute to dysfunction.

Additionally, postorgasmic illness syndrome (POIS) may cause symptoms when aroused, including adrenergic-type presentation: rapid breathing, paresthesia, palpitations, headaches, aphasia, nausea, itchy eyes, fever, muscle pain and weakness, and fatigue.

From the onset of arousal, symptoms can persist for up to a week in patients.

The cause of this condition is unknown; however, it is believed to be a pathology of either the immune system or autonomic nervous systems. It is defined as a rare disease by the National Institute of Health, but the prevalence is unknown. It is not thought to be psychiatric in nature, but it may present as anxiety relating to coital activities and may be incorrectly diagnosed as such. There is no known cure or treatment.

==== Erectile dysfunction ====
Erectile dysfunction (ED), or impotence, is a sexual dysfunction characterized by the inability to develop or maintain an erection of the penis. There are various underlying causes of ED, including damage to anatomical structures, psychological causes, medical disease, and drug use. Many of these causes are medically treatable.

Psychogenic ED is defined as ED primarily due to psychological disease or interpersonal factors. Chronic psychological Psychogenic erectile dysfunction (ED) is characterized by difficulty achieving or maintaining an erection primarily due to psychological or interpersonal factors. Factors such as performance anxiety, relationship distress, or ongoing stress can initially lead to temporary erectile difficulties. If these psychological factors persist over time, they may contribute to physiological changes in vascular and neural pathways, potentially resulting in chronic erectile dysfunction. Psychogenic ED is also strongly associated with depression or low mood, and addressing the underlying psychological or mental health conditions is recommended for effective management.

Medical conditions are also common causes of erectile dysfunction. Diseases such as cardiovascular disease, multiple sclerosis, kidney failure, vascular disease, and spinal cord injury can cause erectile dysfunction.

It is estimated that around 30 million men in the United States and 152 million men worldwide have erectile dysfunction. However, social stigma, low health literacy, and social taboos lead to under reporting which makes an accurate prevalence rate hard to determine.

ED from vascular disease is seen in individuals who have atherosclerosis. Vascular disease is common in individuals who smoke or have diabetes, peripheral vascular disease, or hypertension. Cardiovascular disease can decrease blood flow to penile tissues, making it difficult to develop or maintain an erection.

Drugs are also a cause of erectile dysfunction. Individuals who take drugs that lower blood pressure, antipsychotics, antidepressants, sedatives, narcotics, antacids, or alcohol can have problems with sexual function and loss of libido.

Hormone deficiency is a relatively rare cause of erectile dysfunction. In individuals with testicular failure, as in Klinefelter syndrome, or those who have had radiation therapy, chemotherapy, or childhood exposure to the mumps virus, the testes may fail to produce testosterone. Other hormonal causes of erectile failure include brain tumors, hyperthyroidism, hypothyroidism, or adrenal gland disorders.

=== Orgasm disorders ===
==== Anorgasmia ====
Anorgasmia is classified as persistent delays or absence of orgasm following a normal sexual excitement phase in at least 75% of sexual encounters. The disorder can have physical, psychological, or pharmacological origins. SSRI antidepressants are a common pharmaceutical culprit, as they can delay orgasm or eliminate it entirely. A common physiological cause of anorgasmia is menopause; one in three women report problems obtaining an orgasm during sexual stimulation following menopause.

==== Premature ejaculation ====
Premature ejaculation is when ejaculation occurs before the partner achieves orgasm, or a mutually satisfactory length of time has passed during intercourse. There is no correct length of time for intercourse to last, but generally, premature ejaculation is thought to occur when ejaculation occurs in under two minutes from the time of the insertion of the penis. For a diagnosis, the patient must have a chronic history of premature ejaculation, poor ejaculatory control, and the problem must cause feelings of dissatisfaction as well as distress for the patient, the partner, or both.

Premature ejaculation has historically been attributed to psychological causes, but newer theories suggest that premature ejaculation may have an underlying neurobiological cause that may lead to rapid ejaculation.

==== Post-orgasmic disorders ====
Post-orgasmic disorders cause symptoms shortly after orgasm or ejaculation. Post-coital tristesse (PCT) is a feeling of melancholy and anxiety after sexual intercourse that lasts for up to two hours. Sexual headaches occur in the skull and neck during sexual activity, including masturbation, arousal or orgasm.

In men, post orgasmic illness syndrome (POIS) causes severe muscle pain throughout the body and other symptoms immediately following ejaculation. These symptoms last for up to a week. Some doctors speculate that the frequency of POIS "in the population may be greater than has been reported in the academic literature", and that many with POIS are undiagnosed.

POIS may involve adrenergic symptoms: rapid breathing, paresthesia, palpitations, headaches, aphasia, nausea, itchy eyes, fever, muscle pain and weakness, and fatigue.

The etiology of this condition is unknown; however, it is believed to be a pathology of either the immune system or autonomic nervous systems. It is defined as a rare disease by the NIH, but the prevalence is unknown. It is not thought to be psychiatric in nature, but it may present as anxiety relating to coital activities and thus may be incorrectly diagnosed as such. There is no known cure or treatment.

Dhat syndrome is another condition which occurs in men: it is a culture-bound syndrome which causes anxious and dysphoric mood after sex. It is distinct from the low-mood and concentration problems (acute aphasia) seen in POIS.

=== Sexual pain disorders ===
Sexual pain disorders in women include dyspareunia (painful intercourse) and vaginismus (an involuntary spasm of the muscles of the vaginal wall that interferes with intercourse).

Dyspareunia may be caused by vaginal dryness. Poor lubrication may result from insufficient excitement and stimulation, or from hormonal changes caused by menopause, pregnancy, or breastfeeding. Irritation from contraceptive creams and foams can also cause dryness, as can fear and anxiety about sex.

It is unclear exactly what causes vaginismus, but it is thought that past sexual trauma (such as rape or abuse) may play a role. Another female sexual pain disorder is vulvodynia, or vulvar vestibulitis when localized to the vulval vestibule. In this condition, women experience burning pain during sex, which seems to be related to problems with the skin in the vulvar and vaginal areas. Its cause is unknown.

In men, structural abnormalities of the penis like Peyronie's disease can make sexual intercourse difficult and/or painful. The disease is characterized by thick fibrous bands in the penis that lead to excessive curvature during erection. It has an incidence estimated at 1–20% of men, and is most common in men aged 40–70, although cases have occurred in younger individuals and adolescents. Peyronie's disease has no certain cause, but the leading hypothesis is that it arises from dysregulated wound healing in response to chronic microtrauma of the erect penis. Risk factors include age, genetics, minor trauma (potentially during cystoscopy or transurethral resection of the prostate), chronic systemic vascular diseases, diabetes, smoking, and alcohol consumption.

Priapism is a painful erection that occurs for several hours and occurs in the absence of sexual stimulation. This condition develops when blood is trapped in the penis and is unable to drain. If the condition is not promptly treated, it can lead to severe scarring and permanent loss of erectile function. The disorder is most common in young men and children. Individuals with sickle-cell disease and those who use certain medications can often develop this disorder.

== Causes ==
There are many factors which may result in a person experiencing a sexual dysfunction. These may result from emotional or physical causes. Emotional factors include interpersonal or psychological problems, which include depression, sexual fears or guilt, past sexual trauma, and sexual disorders.

Sexual dysfunction is especially common among people who have anxiety disorders. Ordinary anxiety can cause erectile dysfunction in men without psychiatric problems, but clinically diagnosable disorders such as panic disorder commonly cause avoidance of intercourse and premature ejaculation. Pain during intercourse is often a comorbidity of anxiety disorders among women.

Physical factors that can lead to sexual dysfunctions include the use of drugs, such as alcohol, nicotine, narcotics, stimulants, antihypertensives, antihistamines, and some psychotherapeutic drugs. For women, almost any physiological change that affects the reproductive system—premenstrual syndrome, pregnancy and the postpartum period, and menopause—can have an adverse effect on libido. Back injuries may also impact sexual activity, as can problems with an enlarged prostate gland, problems with blood supply, or nerve damage (as in sexual dysfunction after spinal cord injuries). Diseases such as diabetic neuropathy, multiple sclerosis, tumors, and, rarely, tertiary syphilis may also impact activity, as can the failure of various organ systems (such as the heart and lungs), endocrine disorders (thyroid, pituitary, or adrenal gland problems), hormonal deficiencies (low testosterone, other androgens, or estrogen), and some birth defects.

In the context of heterosexual relationships, one of the main reasons for the decline in sexual activity among these couples is the male partner experiencing erectile dysfunction. This can be very distressing for the male partner, causing poor body image, and it can also be a major source of low desire for these men. In aging women, it is natural for the vagina to narrow and atrophy. If a woman does not participate in sexual activity regularly (in particular, activities involving vaginal penetration), she will not be able to immediately accommodate a penis without risking pain or injury if she decides to engage in penetrative intercourse. This can turn into a vicious cycle that often leads to female sexual dysfunction.

According to Emily Wentzell, American culture has anti-aging sentiments that have caused sexual dysfunction to become "an illness that needs treatment" instead of viewing it as a natural part of the aging process. Not all cultures seek treatment; for example, a population of men living in Mexico often accept ED as a normal part of their maturing sexuality.

=== With SSRI medication ===
Sexual problems are common with SSRIs, which can cause anorgasmia, erectile dysfunction, diminished libido, genital numbness, and sexual anhedonia (pleasureless orgasm). Poor sexual function is also one of the most common reasons people stop the medication. In some cases, symptoms of sexual dysfunction may persist after discontinuation of SSRIs. This combination of symptoms is sometimes referred to as post-SSRI sexual dysfunction.

=== Pelvic floor dysfunction ===
Pelvic floor dysfunction can be an underlying cause of sexual dysfunction in both women and men, and is treatable by pelvic floor physical therapy, a type of physical therapy designed to restore the health and function of the pelvic floor and surrounding areas.

=== Female sexual dysfunction ===
Several theories have looked at female sexual dysfunction, from medical to psychological perspectives. Three social psychological theories include: the self-perception theory, the overjustification hypothesis, and the insufficient justification hypothesis:

- Self-perception theory: people make attributions about their own attitudes, feelings, and behaviours by relying on their observations of external behaviours and the circumstances in which those behaviours occur
- Overjustification hypothesis: when an external reward is given to a person for performing an intrinsically rewarding activity, the person's intrinsic interest will decrease
- Insufficient justification: based on the classic cognitive dissonance theory (inconsistency between two cognitions or between a cognition and a behavior will create discomfort), this theory states that people will alter one of the cognitions or behaviours to restore consistency and reduce distress

The prevalence of sexual dysfunction in women is not well known due to a paucity of epidemiological studies, inconsistent criteria for sexual dysfunction across different studies and incomplete recruitment, with studies often excluding women who were without a partner or who were sexually inactive. However, based on incomplete population based studies from the United States, Europe and Australia, unspecified arousal dysfunction (in which a woman is unable to achieve desirable genital or non-genital sexual arousal despite adequate stimulation and desire) was present in 3-9% of women aged 18–44, 5-7.5% aged 45–64 and 3-6% in women older than 65. Anorgasmia with distress (in which women were unable to achieve an orgasm) was present in 7-8% of women younger than 40, 5-7% aged 40–64 and 3-6% of those older than 65. Poor sexual self image leading to distress was seen in 13.4% of women younger than 40 in an Australian population based study.

The importance of how a woman perceives her behavior should not be underestimated. Many women perceive sex as a chore as opposed to a pleasurable experience, and they tend to consider themselves sexually inadequate, which in turn does not motivate them to engage in sexual activity. Several factors influence a women's perception of her sexual life. These can include race, gender, ethnicity, educational background, socioeconomic status, sexual orientation, financial resources, culture, and religion. Cultural differences are also present in how women view menopause and its impact on health, self-image, and sexuality. A study found that African American women are the most optimistic about menopausal life; Caucasian women are the most anxious, Asian women are the most inhibited about their symptoms, and Hispanic women are the most stoic.

Since these women have sexual problems, their sexual lives with their partners can become a burden without pleasure, and may eventually lose complete interest in sexual activity. Some of the women found it hard to be aroused mentally, while others had physical problems. Several factors can affect female dysfunction, such as situations in which women do not trust their sex partners, the environment where sex occurs being uncomfortable, or an inability to concentrate on the sexual activity due to a bad mood or burdens from work. Other factors include physical discomfort or difficulty in achieving arousal, which could be caused by aging or changes in the body's condition.

Sexual assault has been associated with excessive menstrual bleeding, genital burning, and painful intercourse (attributable to disease, injury, or otherwise), medically unexplained dysmenorrhea, menstrual irregularity, and lack of sexual pleasure. Physically violent assaults and those committed by strangers were most strongly related to reproductive symptoms. Multiple assaults, assaults accomplished by persuasion, spousal assault, and completed intercourse were most strongly related to sexual symptoms. Assault was occasionally associated more strongly with reproductive symptoms among women with lower income or less education, possibly because of economic stress or differences in assault circumstances. Associations with unexplained menstrual irregularity were strongest among African American women; ethnic differences in reported circumstances of assault appeared to account for these differences. Assault was associated with sexual indifference only among Latinas.

=== Menopause ===
The most prevalent of female sexual dysfunctions that have been linked to menopause include lack of desire and libido; these are predominantly associated with hormonal physiology. Specifically, the decline in serum estrogens causes these changes in sexual functioning. Androgen depletion may also play a role, but current knowledge about this is less clear. The hormonal changes that take place during the menopausal transition have been suggested to affect women's sexual response through several mechanisms, some more conclusive than others.

=== Aging in women ===
Whether or not aging directly affects women's sexual functioning during menopause is controversial. However, many studies have demonstrated that aging has a powerful impact on sexual function and dysfunction in women, specifically in the areas of desire, sexual interest, and frequency of orgasm. The primary predictor of sexual response throughout menopause is prior sexual functioning, which means that it is important to understand how the physiological changes in men and women can affect sexual desire. Despite the apparent negative impact that menopause can have on sexuality and sexual functioning, sexual confidence and well-being can improve with age and menopausal status.

Testosterone, along with its metabolite dihydrotestosterone, is important to normal sexual function in men and women. Dihydrotestosterone is the most prevalent androgen in both men and women. Testosterone levels in women at age 60 are on average about half of what they were before the women were 40. Although this decline is gradual for most women, those who have undergone bilateral oophorectomy experience a sudden drop in testosterone levels, as the ovaries produce 40% of the body's circulating testosterone.

Sexual desire has been related to three separate components: drive, beliefs and values, and motivation. Particularly in postmenopausal women, drive fades and is no longer the initial step in a woman's sexual response.

== Diagnosis ==
=== List of disorders ===
==== DSM ====
The fourth edition of the Diagnostic and Statistical Manual of Mental Disorders lists the following sexual dysfunctions:

- Hypoactive sexual desire disorder (see also asexuality, which is not classified as a disorder)
- Sexual aversion disorder (avoidance of or lack of desire for sexual intercourse)
- Female sexual arousal disorder (failure of normal lubricating arousal response)
- Male erectile disorder
- Female orgasmic disorder (see anorgasmia)
- Male orgasmic disorder (see anorgasmia)
- Premature ejaculation
- Dyspareunia
- Vaginismus

Additional DSM sexual disorders that are not sexual dysfunctions include:

- Paraphilias
- PTSD due to genital mutilation or childhood sexual abuse

==== Other sexual problems ====
- Sexual dissatisfaction (non-specific)
- Lack of sexual desire
- Anorgasmia
- Impotence
- Sexually transmitted infections
- Delay or absence of ejaculation, despite adequate stimulation
- Inability to control timing of ejaculation
- Inability to relax vaginal muscles enough to allow intercourse
- Inadequate vaginal lubrication preceding and during intercourse
- Burning pain on the vulva or in the vagina with contact to those areas
- Unhappiness or confusion related to sexual orientation
- Transsexual and transgender people may have sexual problems before or after surgery.
- Persistent sexual arousal syndrome
- Sexual addiction
- Hypersexuality
- All forms of female genital cutting
- Post-orgasmic diseases, such as Dhat syndrome, PCT, POIS, and sexual headaches.
- Hard flaccid syndrome

== Treatment ==
=== Males ===
Several decades ago, the medical community believed most sexual dysfunction cases were related to psychological issues. Although this may be true for a portion of men, the vast majority of cases have now been identified to have a physical cause or a correlation. If the sexual dysfunction is deemed to have a psychological component or cause, psychotherapy can help. Situational anxiety arises from an earlier bad incident or lack of experience, and often leads to development of fear towards sexual activity and avoidance which enters a cycle of increased anxiety and desensitization of the penis. In some cases, erectile dysfunction may be due to marital disharmony. Marriage counseling sessions are recommended in this situation.

Lifestyle changes such as discontinuing tobacco smoking or substance use can also treat some types of ED. Several oral medications like Viagra, Cialis, and Levitra have become available to alleviate ED and have become first line therapy. These medications provide an easy, safe, and effective treatment solution for approximately 60% of men. In the rest, the medications may not work because of wrong diagnosis or chronic history.

Another type of medication that is effective in roughly 85% of men is called intracavernous pharmacotherapy, which involves injecting a vasodilator drug directly into the penis to stimulate an erection. This method has an increased risk of priapism if used in conjunction with other treatments, and localized pain.

Premature ejaculations are treated by behavioural techniques Squeeze technique and Stop Start Technique. In Squeeze technique the area between head and shaft of penis is pressed using index finger and thumb just before ejaculation. In Stop Start Technique the male partner stops having sexual intercourse just before ejaculation and waits for the sense of ejaculation to pass away. Both Techniques are repeated many times.

When conservative therapies fail, are an unsatisfactory treatment option, or are contraindicated for use, the insertion of a penile implant may be selected by the patient. Technological advances have made the insertion of a penile implant a safe option for the treatment of ED, which provides the highest patient and partner satisfaction rates of all available ED treatment options.

Pelvic floor physical therapy has been shown to be a valid treatment for men with sexual problems and pelvic pain.

The 2020 guidelines from the American College of Physicians support the discussion of testosterone treatment in adult men with age-related low levels of testosterone who have sexual dysfunction. They recommend yearly evaluation regarding possible improvement and, if none, to discontinue testosterone; intramuscular treatments should be considered rather than transdermal treatments due to costs and since the effectiveness and harm of either method is similar. Testosterone treatment for reasons other than possible improvement of sexual dysfunction may not be recommended.

=== Females ===
In 2015, flibanserin was approved in the US to treat decreased sexual desire in women. While it is effective for some women, it has been criticized for its limited efficacy, and has many warnings and contraindications that limit its use. Flibanserin was found to increase pleasurable sexual experiences by 0.5 events per month in trials. Possible side effects include dizziness, drowsiness, nausea and fatigue. Flibanserin should not be taken with alcohol. Bremelanotide has been shown to modestly increase sexual desire in women, but it has not shown evidence of increasing the number of satisfactory sexual experiences per month. Possible side effects include nausea, flushing and headaches. Women experiencing pain with intercourse are often prescribed pain relievers or desensitizing agents; others are prescribed vaginal lubricants. Many women with sexual dysfunction are also referred to a counselor or sex therapist. Counselling for female sexual dysfunction, including sexual counselling, cognitive behavioral therapy, body awareness counselling, and couples counselling have been found to be helpful.

Estrogen replacement therapy, outside of the indicated use for menopausal symptoms, is not recommended for the treatment of sexual dysfunction in women.

==== Menopause ====
Estrogens are responsible for the maintenance of collagen, elastic fibers, and vasculature of the urogenital tract, all of which are important in maintaining vaginal structure and functional integrity; they are also important for maintaining vaginal pH and moisture levels, both of which help to keep the tissues lubricated and protected. Prolonged estrogen deficiency leads to atrophy, fibrosis, and reduced blood flow to the urogenital tract, which cause menopausal symptoms such as vaginal dryness and pain related to sexual activity and/or intercourse. Women experiencing vaginal dryness who cannot use commercial lubricants may be able to use coconut oil as an alternative.

Androgen therapy for hypoactive sexual desire disorder has a small benefit but its safety is not known. It is not approved as a treatment in the United States. It is more commonly used among women who have had an oophorectomy or are in a postmenopausal state. However, like most treatments, this is also controversial. One study found that after a 24-week trial, women taking androgens had higher scores of sexual desire compared to a placebo group. As with all pharmacological drugs, there are side effects in using androgens, which include hirsutism, acne, polycythaemia, increased high-density lipoproteins, cardiovascular risks, and endometrial hyperplasia. Alternative treatments include topical estrogen creams and gels that can be applied to the vulva or vagina area to treat vaginal dryness and atrophy.

== Research ==
In modern times, clinical study of sexual problems is usually dated back no earlier than 1970 when Masters and Johnson's Human Sexual Inadequacy was published. It was the result of over a decade of work at the Reproductive Biology Research Foundation in St. Louis, involving 790 cases. The work grew from Masters and Johnson's earlier Human Sexual Response (1966).

Prior to Masters and Johnson, the clinical approach to sexual problems was largely derived from Sigmund Freud. It was held to be psychopathology and approached with a certain pessimism regarding the chance of help or improvement. Sexual problems were merely symptoms of a deeper malaise, and the diagnostic approach was from the psychopathological viewpoint. There was little distinction between difficulties in function and variations nor between perversion and problems. Despite work by psychotherapists such as Balint sexual difficulties were crudely split into frigidity or impotence, terms which acquired negative connotations in popular culture.

Human Sexual Inadequacy moved thinking from psychopathology to learning; psychopathological problems would only be considered if a problem did not respond to educative treatment. Treatment was directed at couples, whereas before partners would be seen individually. Masters and Johnson believed that sex was a joint act, and that sexual communication was the key issue to sexual problems, not the specifics of an individual problem. They also proposed co-therapy, with a pair of therapists to match the clients, arguing that a lone male therapist could not fully comprehend female difficulties.

The basic Masters and Johnson treatment program was an intensive two-week program to develop efficient sexual communication. The program is couple-based and therapist-led, and began with discussion and sensate focus between the couple to develop shared experiences. From the experiences, specific difficulties could be determined and approached with a specific therapy. In a limited number of male-only cases (41) Masters and Johnson developed the use of a female surrogate, which was abandoned over the ethical, legal, and other problems it raised.

In defining the range of sexual problems, Masters and Johnson defined a boundary between dysfunction and deviations. Dysfunctions were transitory and experienced by most people, and included male primary or secondary impotence, premature ejaculation, and ejaculatory incompetence; female primary orgasmic dysfunction and situational orgasmic dysfunction; pain during intercourse (dyspareunia) and vaginismus. According to Masters and Johnson, sexual arousal and climax are a normal physiological process of every functionally intact adult, but they can be inhibited despite being autonomic responses. Masters and Johnson's treatment program for dysfunction was 81.1% successful.

Despite Masters and Johnson's work, sexual therapy in the US was overrun by enthusiastic rather than systematic approaches, blurring the space between "enrichment" and therapy.

== See also ==
- Agony aunt
- Dapoxetine
- Orgastic impotence
- Premature ejaculation
- Sex and drugs
- Sex after pregnancy
- Sexless marriage
- Sexual arousal disorder
- Dapoxetine
