= International Journal of Impotence Research =

Medical journal

- Discipline: Sexual medicine
- Language: English
- Edited by: Ege Can Serefoglu

Publication details
- History: 1989-present
- Publisher: Springer Nature
- Frequency: Bimonthly
- Impact factor: 2.408 (2021)

Standard abbreviations
- ISO 4: Int. J. Impot. Res.

Indexing
- CODEN: IJIRFB
- ISSN: 0955-9930 (print); 1476-5489 (web)
- LCCN: 90031214
- OCLC no.: 225097711

Links
- Journal homepage; Online archive

IJIR: Your Sexual Medicine Journal is a bimonthly peer-reviewed medical journal covering the study of sexual dysfunction. It was established in 1989 and is published by Springer Nature. The editor-in-chief is Ege Can Serefoglu. According to the Journal Citation Reports, the journal has a 2021 impact factor of 2.408, ranking it 43rd out of 90 journals in the category "Urology and Nephrology".
