= Party and play =

Drug use to facilitate sexual activity

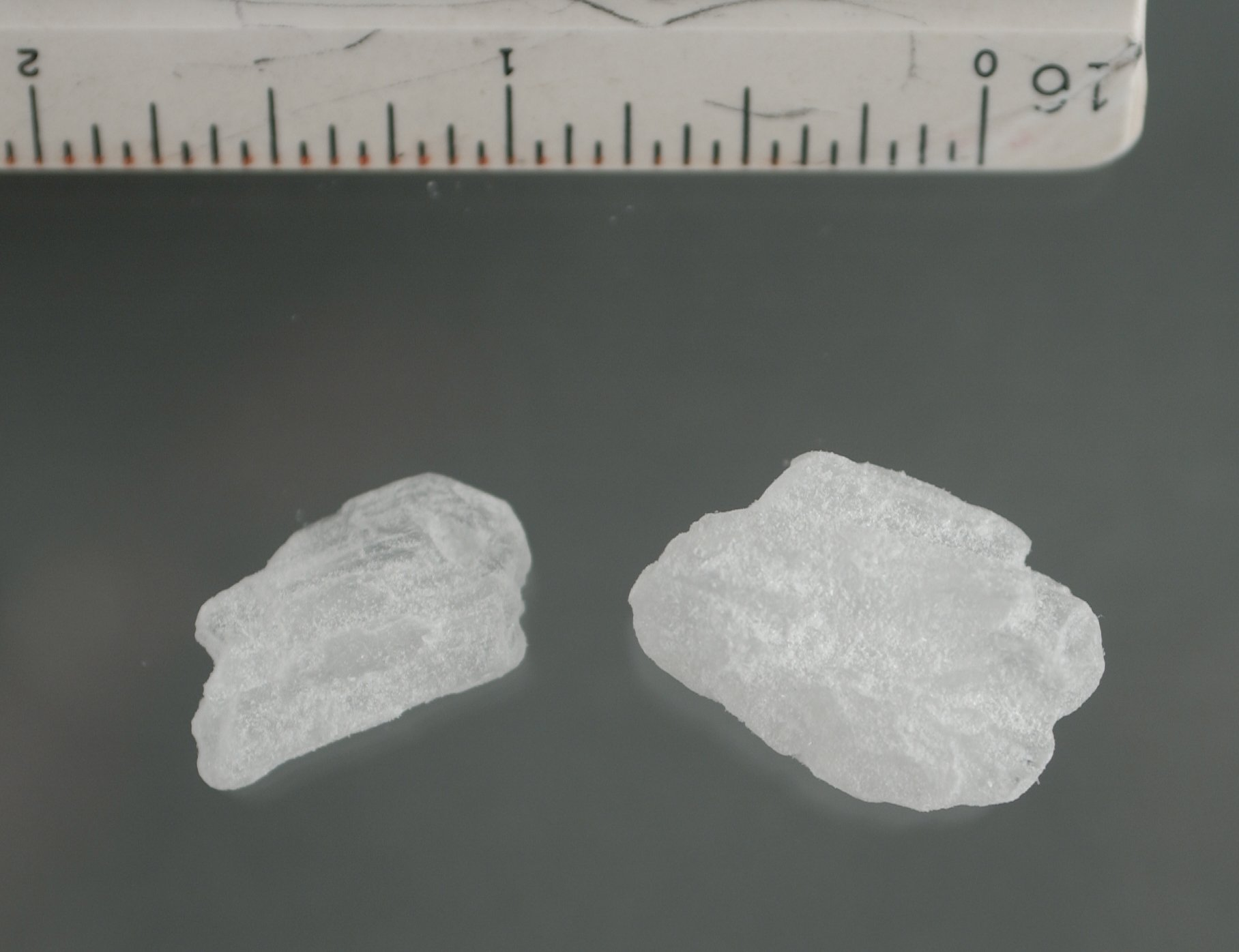
Methamphetamine is the drug most associated with party and play.

Party and play (PnP), also known as high and horny (HnH), chemsex, pharmacosex, or wired play, refers to the practice of consuming drugs to enhance sexual activity. This sexual subculture involves recreational drug users engaging in high-risk sexual behaviors under the influence of drugs, often within specific sub-groups. Activities may include unprotected sex with multiple partners during sessions over extended periods, sometimes lasting days. The drug of choice is typically methamphetamine, commonly referred to as crystal meth, tina, or T. Other substances like mephedrone, GHB, GBL, ketamine, and alkyl nitrites (known as poppers) are also used. The term slamsex is used for injection drug users.

Studies indicate that individuals participating in such activities have a higher likelihood of acquiring sexually transmitted infections, including HIV / AIDS, due to unprotected sex with numerous partners. Consequently, addressing this issue is considered a significant public health priority.

== Terminology ==
The practice is commonly referred to as "party 'n' play" (PNP or PnP) by some participants, while others use the term "high 'n' horny" (HnH). An academic study has labeled it "sexualized drug use" (SDU). The term PnP is widely used among gay men and other men who have sex with men (MSM) in North America and Australia. Conversely, the term chemsex is more common in Europe. In certain Southeast Asian countries, it is commonly known as "chem fun" (CF or Cf).

== Participants and drugs ==
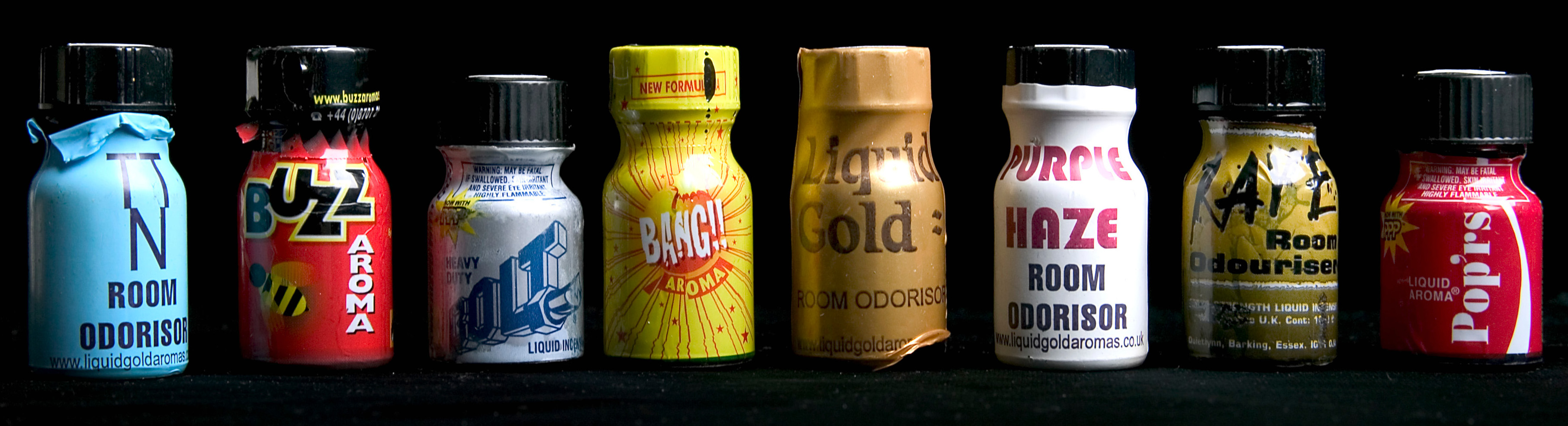
A selection of poppers

Methamphetamine is often used recreationally for its effects as an aphrodisiac, euphoriant, and stimulant. It has been further described that "an entire subculture known as 'party and play' is based around methamphetamine use." Gay men belonging to this subculture will typically meet up through internet dating sites to have sex. On such sites, men often include notations such as "chems" or "PnP". Since stimulant drugs such as methamphetamine drastically delay the need for sleep, increase sexual arousal, and tend to inhibit ejaculation, PNP sexual encounters can continue for many hours or even days.

Methamphetamine taken in excess of amounts prescribed or recommended will prolong symptoms of intoxication for up to eight hours. In some cases, these sexual encounters will sometimes occur continuously for several days along with repeated methamphetamine use. Methamphetamine is used to create euphoria, "heighten sexual appetite", and increase sexual stamina. The crash following the use of methamphetamine in this manner is very often severe, with marked hypersomnia.

Ketamine is very different from the main chemsex drugs, as it is a dissociative anesthetic that distorts perception and causes dissociation. Ketamine is used in chemsex encounters to "improve the experience of receptive anal intercourse or fisting".

A study of sauna participants in Barcelona, Spain, in 2016, found that the most commonly used drugs in chemsex are "GHB/GBL, cocaine, ecstasy, silver bars (MDMA), poppers and Viagra".

A 2014 study on chemsex in London, United Kingdom, indicated that the drugs associated with chemsex include mephedrone, GHB/GBL, crystal meth, ketamine, and cocaine.

Internet posts by men seeking PnP experiences often use slang to identify what drug they are partying with. These drugs tend to inhibit penile erection, a phenomenon known by the slang term crystal penis or tweaker dick. Consequently, many men who engage in PnP use erectile dysfunction drugs such as sildenafil, vardenafil, and tadalafil. Loperamide (Imodium) is often taken by participants in passive anal sex in order to be clean for longer.

For some PnP participants, substance use may facilitate a process of "cognitive disengagement" or moral disengagement from the fears and stipulations associated with sex in the time of HIV/AIDS. Popular discourses of "disinhibition" provide a commonly accepted alibi for activities engaged in when under the influence of stimulants.

The psychedelic phenethylamine 2C-B was once sold commercially under the brand name "Erox" for use at low doses as a sexual enhancer in Germany. The atypical psychedelic tryptamines 5-MeO-DiPT (foxy methoxy) and 5-MeO-MiPT (moxy) produce sexual and tactile enhancement with only weak hallucinogenic effects at typical doses and are used to enhance sexual experiences as well.

== Risks ==
The use of drugs like mephedrone, GHB/GBL, and crystal meth before or during sex, can have physical effects. These can include dehydration, a higher risk of HIV and other sexually transmitted infections (STIs), and drug-related injuries. Dehydration is a widespread problem with chemsex. This can lead to serious health problems, including seizures and even death. GHB/GBL and crystal meth can also increase the risk of injuries due to accidents or sexual encounters that go wrong. These injuries can be as minor as cuts and bruises, but they can also be dangerous in severe cases, such as haemorrhages, anal fissures, ripped anuses, anal prolapse and suffocation. Furthermore, the use of these drugs can affect erection and ejaculation. Gay/Bisexual men will often use Viagra or other ED drugs to overcome this issue. Unfortunately, this means that their body has to cope with drug interactions that can go wrong leading, in some cases, to overdose, seizures, drug induced heart attacks, stroke, paralysis, neurological damage and even death. These physical risks are higher in older men and those with pre-existing medical conditions.

The same drug-induced loss of inhibitions makes PNP enthusiasts more vulnerable to more immediate threats, such as robbery, date rape, assault, or murder, by someone whom they meet for sex. Men in the chemsex scene have stated that sexual consent is not clearly defined and there can be a perception that anyone at a "party and play" get-together is assumed to consent. Some substances like GHB and ketamine can cause an inability to communicate or remain conscious which raises serious issues of consent. Using drugs to intentionally sexually violate someone is called Drug-Facilitated Sexual Assault.

The abuse of drugs such as methamphetamine may cause neurological damage. Impaired judgement due to intoxication may lead to bareback sex, which increases the chances of contracting HIV.

According to the UK's NHS, the use of crystal methamphetamine or mephedrone for chemsex is associated with "high-risk sexual behaviour… with little regard to consequences, poor [antiretroviral drug] adherence for HIV, poor use of condoms, extended episodes of (often traumatic) sexual pursuits (e.g. fisting) typically lasting two to three days, [and] multiple sexual partners. Men who have sex with men in the chemsex scene who inject drugs tend to use 'clumsy injecting practices and knowledge', which increases the risks of injection problems. As well, since most chemsex takes place in private home parties, it is hard for public health staff to reach these participants to inform them of safer practices, as compared to reaching gay men in nightclubs, who can be approached by outreach workers".

Methamphetamine suppresses autonomic response and can cause sores and abrasions in the mouth. Open wounds or damaged mucous membranes can turn typically low-HIV-risk sex acts such as oral sex into much-higher-risk sexual activity unless all HIV-positive participants are undetectable on HAART, and all HIV-negative participants are taking pre-exposure prophylaxis in strict accordance with prescription instructions.

== Statistics ==
Men who PNP with methamphetamine, cocaine, MDMA, and ketamine are twice as likely to have unprotected sex (meaning sex without using a condom or taking PrEP), according to British research from 2006. The study also found that up to 20% of gay men from central London gyms had tried methamphetamine, the drug most associated with PNPing.

== History and cultural significance ==
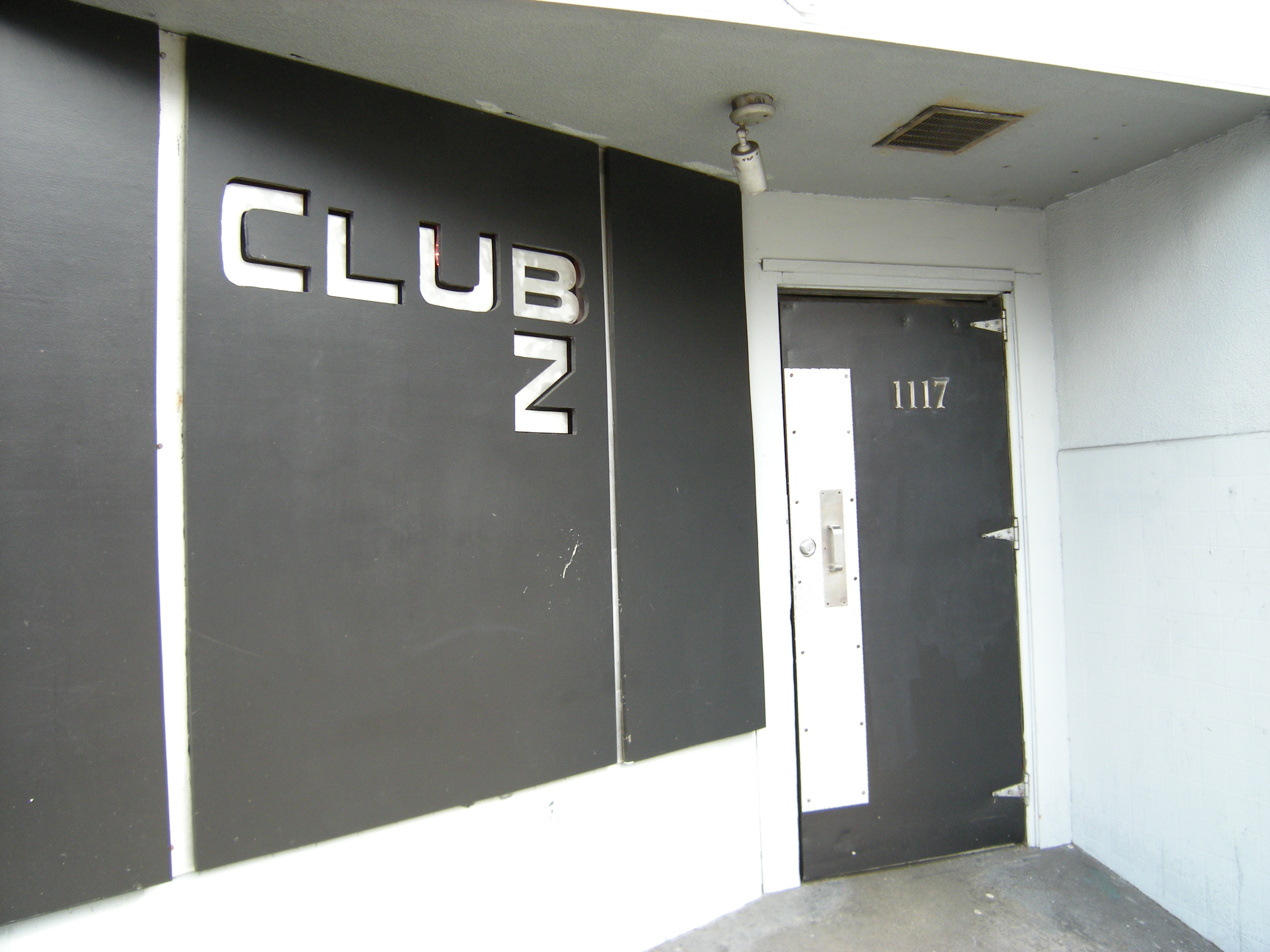
Party and play has been associated with the sauna and bathhouse scene. Pictured is the Club Z bathhouse in Seattle.

Subcultures of psychoactive drug use have long existed within urban gay communities, since the 1970s disco era and before. These substances have been used for dancing, socializing, communal celebration and other purposes. The rise of online websites and hookup apps in the 1990s gave men new ways of cruising and meeting sexual partners, including the ability to arrange private sexual gatherings in their homes.

From the early 2000s, historic venues of gay socialization such as bars, clubs, and dance events reduced in number in response to a range of factors, including gentrification, zoning laws, licensing restrictions, and the increased number of closeted or sexually labile men who are under the influence of drugs and the increasing popularity of digital technologies for sexual and social purposes.

In this context, PNP emerged as an alternative form of sexualized partying that enabled participants to avoid the public scrutiny and potentially judgmental and anxiety-provoking nature of the "public space". Newly popular drugs such as methamphetamine and GHB/GBL replaced dance drugs such as Ecstasy within this context.

While PNP sessions tend to be organized around sex, there is some evidence that they can serve a range of social purposes for their participants, including the opportunity to meet other gay men, become friends, and engage in erotic play and experimentation. In some instances, PNP sessions play a part in the formation of loose social networks that are valued and relied upon by participants. For other men, increasing reliance on hookup apps and websites to arrange sex may result in a sense of isolation that may exacerbate the risk of drug dependence, especially in the context of a lack of other venues for gay socializing and sexual community-formation.

A 2014 study found that one of the key reasons for taking drugs before and during sex was to boost sexual confidence and reduce feelings of self-doubt, regarding feelings of "internalised homophobia" from society, concerns about an HIV diagnosis, or "guilt related to having or desiring gay sex". A key self-confidence issue for study participants was "body image", a concern that was heightened by the focus on social networking apps on appearance, because on these apps, there is a focus on idealized male bodies that are "toned and muscular". Men were also anxious about their sexual performance, and as such, taking drugs can reduce these anxieties and enable them to enjoy sex more.

== Criticism of reporting ==
It has been observed that reliable data and relevant research are generally lacking and this situation is generating a climate of moral panic. In an opinion piece published by The Guardian, it has been argued that an exaggerated reporting might give the public a distorted impression of the magnitude of this phenomenon and that may increase the level of collective anxiety.

== See also ==
- Group sex
- LGBTQ slang
- Mental health of LGBTQ people
- Sexual addiction
- Sex and drugs
- Chemsex (documentary film)
- Drugs and sexual consent
