= Dapoxetine =

Medication used to treat premature ejaculation

Clinical data
- Pronunciation: /dəpɑːksətin/ də-PAHK-sə-teen
- Trade names: EJ-30, Priligy, others (see below)
- AHFS/Drugs.com: International Drug Names
- Routes of administration: By mouth
- ATC code: G04BX14 (WHO)

Legal status
- Legal status: BR: Class C1 (Other controlled substances); In general: ℞ (Prescription only)

Pharmacokinetic data
- Bioavailability: 15–76% (mean 42%), T_{max} = 1–1.3 hours
- Protein binding: >99%
- Metabolism: Liver (CYP2D6, CYP3A4), kidney (FMO1)
- Metabolites: Dapoxetine-N-oxide, desmethyldapoxetine, didesmethyldapoxetine
- Elimination half-life: 1.5–1.6 hours
- Excretion: Kidneys

Identifiers
- IUPAC name: (S)-N,N-Dimethyl-3-(naphthalen-1-yloxy)-1-phenylpropan-1-amine
- CAS Number: 119356-77-3 129938-20-1 (HCl salt)
- PubChem CID: 71353
- IUPHAR/BPS: 7901
- ChemSpider: 64453
- UNII: GB2433A4M3
- KEGG: D03649
- ChEMBL: ChEMBL2106574
- CompTox Dashboard (EPA): DTXSID0057627

Chemical and physical data
- Formula: C_{21}H_{23}NO
- Molar mass: 305.421 g·mol^{−1}
- 3D model (JSmol): Interactive image
- SMILES: CN(C)[C@@H](CCOc1cccc2ccccc12)c1ccccc1
- InChI: InChI=1S/C21H23NO/c1-22(2)20(18-10-4-3-5-11-18)15-16-23-21-14-8-12-17-9-6-7-13-19(17)21/h3-14,20H,15-16H2,1-2H3/t20-/m0/s1; Key:USRHYDPUVLEVMC-FQEVSTJZSA-N

Dapoxetine, sold under the brand name Priligy among others, is a selective serotonin reuptake inhibitor (SSRI) used for the treatment of premature ejaculation (PE) in men ages 18 to 64 years old. Dapoxetine works by inhibiting the serotonin transporter, increasing serotonin's action at the postsynaptic cleft, and as a consequence promoting ejaculatory delay. As a member of the SSRI family, dapoxetine was initially created as an antidepressant. However, unlike other SSRIs, dapoxetine is absorbed and eliminated rapidly in the body. Its fast-acting property makes it suitable for the treatment of PE, but not as an antidepressant.

Originally created by Eli Lilly pharmaceutical company, dapoxetine was sold to Johnson & Johnson in 2003 and submitted as a New Drug Application to the US Food and Drug Administration (FDA) for the treatment of PE in 2004. Dapoxetine is sold in several European and Asian countries, and in Mexico. In the US, dapoxetine has been in phase III development. In May 2012, US-based Furiex Pharmaceuticals reached an agreement with ALZA Corp and Janssen Pharmaceuticals to market dapoxetine in the United States, Japan, and Canada, while selling the rights to market the drug in Europe, most of Asia, Africa, Latin America, and the Middle East to Menarini.

== Medical uses ==
=== Premature ejaculation ===
Randomized, double-blind, placebo-controlled trials have confirmed the efficacy of dapoxetine for the treatment of PE. Different dosages have different impacts on different types of PE. Dapoxetine 60 mg significantly improves the mean intravaginal ejaculation latency time (IELT) compared to that of dapoxetine 30 mg in men with lifelong PE, but no difference is seen in men with acquired PE. Dapoxetine, given 1–3 hours before sexual episode, prolongs IELT and increases the sense of control and sexual satisfaction in men of 18 to 64 years of age with PE. Since PE is associated with personal distress and interrelationship difficulty, dapoxetine provides help for men with PE to overcome this condition.

With no drug approved specifically for treatment for PE in the US and some other countries, other SSRIs such as fluoxetine, paroxetine, sertraline, fluvoxamine, and citalopram have been used off-label to treat PE. Waldinger's meta-analysis shows that the use of these conventional antidepressants increases IELT two- to nine-fold above baseline, compared to three- to eight-fold when dapoxetine is used. However, these SSRIs may need to be taken daily to achieve meaningful efficacy, and their comparatively longer half-lives increase the risk of drug accumulation and a corresponding increase of adverse effects such as reduced libido. Dapoxetine, though, is generally categorized as a fast-acting SSRI. It is more rapidly absorbed and mostly eliminated from the body within a few hours. These pharmacokinetics are more favorable in that they might minimize drug accumulation in the body, habituation, and side effects.

=== Depression and anxiety ===
Dapoxetine was initially considered unsuccessful in its intended use as an antidepressant; however, it has since been investigated as a possible aid to an approach to depression treatment focused on stress reduction, based on an animal model of depression.

== Contraindications ==
Dapoxetine should not be used in men with moderate to severe hepatic impairment and in those receiving CYP3A4 inhibitors such as ketoconazole, ritonavir, and telithromycin. Dapoxetine also cannot be used in patients with heart failure, permanent pacemaker, or other significant ischemic heart disease. Caution is advised in men receiving thioridazine, monoamine oxidase inhibitors, SSRIs, serotonin-norepinephrine reuptake inhibitors, or tricyclic antidepressants. If a patient stops taking one of these drugs, he should wait for 14 days before taking dapoxetine. If a patient stops taking dapoxetine, he should wait for 7 days before receiving these drugs.

== Adverse effects ==
The most common effects when taking dapoxetine are nausea, dizziness, dry mouth, headache, diarrhea, and insomnia. Discontinuation rates due to adverse effects and costs are very high, as demonstrated in a study in Asia which showed that cumulative discontinuation rates within one year are as high as 87%. Unlike other SSRIs used to treat depression, which have been associated with high incidences of sexual dysfunction, dapoxetine is associated with low rates of sexual dysfunction. Taken as needed, dapoxetine has very mild adverse effects of decreased libido (<1%) and erectile dysfunction (<4%).

=== Overdose ===
No case of drug overdose has been reported during clinical trials.

== Interactions ==
=== Phosphodiesterase 5 inhibitors ===
Many men who have PE also suffer from erectile dysfunction (ED). Treatment for these patients should consider the drug–drug interaction between dapoxetine and PDE5 inhibitors such as tadalafil (Cialis) or sildenafil (Viagra). In Dresser study (2006), plasma concentration of 24 subjects was obtained. Half of the sample pool were treated with dapoxetine 60 mg plus tadalafil 20 mg; the other half were treated with dapoxetine 60 mg plus sildenafil 100 mg. These plasma samples were then analyzed using liquid chromatography-tandem mass spectrometry. The results showed that dapoxetine does not alter the pharmacokinetics of tadalafil or sildenafil.

=== Alcohol ===
Alcohol does not affect the pharmacokinetics of dapoxetine when taking concurrently.

== Pharmacology ==
=== Mechanism of action ===
The mechanism through which dapoxetine affects premature ejaculation is still unclear, but dapoxetine is presumed to work by inhibiting serotonin transporter (SERT) and subsequently increasing serotonin's action at pre- and postsynaptic receptors. Human ejaculation is regulated by various areas in the central nervous system (CNS). The ejaculatory pathway originates from spinal reflex at the thoracolumbar and lumbosacral level of spinal cord activated by stimuli from male genitalia. These signals are passed on to the brain stem, which then is influenced by a number of nuclei in the brain such as medial preoptic and paraventricular nuclei. Clement's study performed on anaesthetized male rats showed that acute administration of dapoxetine inhibits ejaculatory expulsion reflex at supraspinal level by modulating activity of lateral paragigantocellular nucleus (LPGi) neurons. These effects cause an increase in pudendal motoneuron reflex discharge (PMRD) latency, though whether dapoxetine acts directly on LPGi or on the descending pathway in which LPGi located is unclear.

=== Pharmacokinetics ===
Absorption

Dapoxetine is a white, powdery, water-insoluble substance. Taken one to three hours before sexual activity, it is rapidly absorbed in the body. Its maximum plasma concentration (C_{max}) is reached one to two hours after oral administration. The C_{max} and AUC (area under the plasma vs. time curve) is dose dependent. The C_{max} and Tm (time needed to obtain the maximum plasma concentration) after single doses of dapoxetine 30 mg and 60 mg are 297 and 498 ng/ml at 1.01 and 1.27 hours, respectively. A high-fat meal does reduce the C_{max} slightly, but it is insignificant. In fact, food does not alter dapoxetine pharmacokinetics. It can be taken with or without food.

Distribution

Dapoxetine is absorbed and distributed rapidly in the body. Greater than 99% of dapoxetine is bound to the plasma protein. The mean steady-state volume is 162 L. Its initial half-life is 1.31 hours (30 mg dose) and 1.42 hours (60 mg dose), and its terminal half life is 18.7 hours (30 mg dose) and 21.9 hours (60 mg dose).

Metabolism

Dapoxetine is metabolized extensively in the liver and kidney by multiple enzymes such as CYP2D6, CYP3A4, and flavin monooxygenase 1. The major product at the end of the metabolic pathway is circulating dapoxetine N-oxide, which is a weak SSRI and contributes no clinical effect. The other products presented less than 3% in the plasma are desmethyldapoxetine and didesmethydapoxetine. Desmethyldapoxetine is roughly equipotent to dapoxetine.

Excretion

The metabolites of dapoxetine are eliminated rapidly in the urine with a terminal half-life of 18.7 and 21.9 hours for a single dose of 30 mg and 60 mg, respectively.

== Safety and tolerability ==
=== Cardiovascular safety ===
The cardiovascular safety profile of dapoxetine has been studied extensively during the drug development. Phase I trials showed that dapoxetine had neither clinically significant electrocardiographic effects nor delayed repolarization effects, with dosing up to four-fold greater than the maximum recommended dosage, which is 60 mg. Phase III studies in men with PE showed a safety and well tolerated profile of dapoxetine with dosing of 30 and 60 mg. No cardiovascular adverse had been found.

=== Neurocognitive safety ===
Studies of SSRIs in patients with major psychiatric disorders prove that SSRIs are potentially associated with certain neurocognitive adverse effects such as anxiety, akathisia, hypomania, changes in mood, or suicidal thought. No study on the effects of SSRIs in men with PE has been done. McMahon's study in 2012 showed that dapoxetine has no effect on mood and is not associated with anxiety or suicidality.

=== Withdrawal ===
The incidence of antidepressant discontinuation syndrome symptoms in men using dapoxetine to treat PE has been described by reviewers as low or no different from the incidence of such symptoms in men withdrawn from placebo treatment. The lack of chronic serotonergic stimulation with on-demand dapoxetine minimizes the potentiation action of serotonin at synaptic cleft, thus decreasing the risk of discontinuation symptoms.

== Synthesis ==
Synthesis of dapoxetine

Currently, very few methods are used to synthesize (S)-dapoxetine. This novel approach consists of only six steps in which three main steps are shown above. The initial reactant is trans-cinnamyl alcohol, which is commercially available. Sharpless asymmetric epoxidation and Mitsunobu reaction have been used to produce expected (S)-dapoxetine. The overall yield is 35%. This method is considered a good choice compared to the known methods due to high yield and easily obtainable reactants.

== Regulatory history ==
Dapoxetine was created by Eli Lilly and in phase I clinical trial as an antidepressant. It never worked out well as a medication for the treatment of depression, though, and was shelved for a while before subsequently developed to treat PE. In December 2003, Eli Lilly sold the patent for dapoxetine to Pharmaceutical Product Development (PPD) for US$65 million. Eli Lilly may also receive royalties payment from PPD if the sale exceeds a certain amount. Research into the effectiveness of dapoxetine was revisited in 2020.

ALZA is the current owner of dapoxetine, but PPD will receive milestone payments and drug royalties from ALZA. If approved, dapoxetine will be marketed in the US by Ortho McNeil pharmaceutical, Inc. Ortho McNeil and Janssen-Ortho Inc, or Janssen-Cilag are all units of Johnson & Johnson. As at 2005, dapoxetine was in phase III clinical trials, pending review by the FDA.

Dapoxetine has been marketed and approved in more than 50 countries. Dapoxetine has been approved in Italy, Spain, Mexico, South Korea, and New Zealand in 2009 and 2010; marketed in Sweden, Austria, Germany, Finland, Spain, Portugal, and Italy. It has also been approved in France, Russia, Malaysia, Philippines, Argentina, and Uruguay.

== See also ==
- List of investigational sexual dysfunction drugs
