= Sexual Medicine Reviews =

- Language: English
- Edited by: Annamaria Giraldi (2025 onwards); Irwin Goldstein (2014 - 2024); Cully Carson (2012 - 2014)

Publication details
- Publisher: OUP

Standard abbreviations
- ISO 4: Sex. Med. Rev.

Indexing
- ISSN: 2050-0513 (print); 2050-0521 (web)

Links
- Journal homepage

Sexual Medicine Reviews is an open access peer-reviewed journal of the medicine of sexuality. It is abstracted and indexed by Scopus.
