= Cannabis and sex =

Human consumption of cannabis (which is commonly known as marijuana, pot or weed) is commonly thought to enhance sexual pleasure but there is limited scientific research on the relationship between cannabis and sex, in part due to U.S. drug policies that focus on prohibition. Effects of cannabis are difficult to study because sexual arousal and functioning are extremely complex and differ among individuals. Cannabis affects people differently, making it difficult to study. Both men and women report greater sexual pleasure after having consumed cannabis but there is no scientific evidence of the effects on the physiological components of the sexual response cycle when using the drug.

== Research ==
As of 2010, research on the effects of cannabis on sex in humans is limited to self-report studies. This type of study has disadvantages because it requires people to accurately remember how much they consumed and its effects, leaving researchers unable to verify responses. In these studies, the majority of people who consumed cannabis before sex reported they experienced greater pleasure than those without it. Researchers believe this reported increase in sexual pleasure is likely a result of the drug’s effects on the senses. In particular, it commonly makes users feel more relaxed.

Some research says the amount of cannabis consumed affects one's sexual experience. In one study, 59% of users thought sexual pleasure was enhanced after smoking one joint, though 39% thought consuming more than one joint provided any further enhancement; and large doses of cannabis have been used in India as a sexual depressant.

It is not clear whether cannabis consumption affects the quality of orgasms; over half of male consumers, as well as a lower percentage of female consumers, reported it enhances their orgasms. In a small study published in 1979, 84 graduate students, the majority of whom were men and identified as "experienced smokers", believed cannabis increased the intensity of orgasms and should be considered an aphrodisiac. Some more-recent studies said orgasms are improved with cannabis use.

Studies on the effects of cannabis consumption on sex have shown few other significant physical improvements. In 1979, Masters and Johnson completed a five-year-long study with a sample size of 800 men and 500 women whose ages ranged between 18 and 30 years old. In this study, men reported no improvements in maintaining erections or any increase in penile firmness. Women reported no increase of vaginal lubrication.

A study in 2017 in the Journal of Sexual Medicine looked at data from the large, nationally representative National Survey of Family Growth and included more than 28,000 women and nearly 23,000 men. It reviewed survey responses on the frequency of cannabis consumption and intercourse in the four weeks prior to the survey. It found women who consumed cannabis daily had an average of 7.1 sexual encounters in the previous four weeks compared with 6 for those who never consumed it. Men who consumed cannabis daily reported having 6.9 sexual encounters on average compared with 5.6 in those men who never consumed it.

There is evidence of the negative effects of cannabis use during sex. Some studies show a correlation between chronic cannabis use and reduced testosterone levels in men. It has been found heavy use of cannabis decreases the sperm count of healthy men, though this reduction can be reversed. Habitual use of cannabis is also linked to decreased sexual performance while increasing sexual arousal.

== Psychotropic mechanism ==
The effects of cannabis begin as a chemical process in the brain in which the neural communication network becomes altered. Tetrahydrocannabinol's (THC) chemical structure is similar to that of anandamide, which is responsible for sending chemical messages between neurons throughout the nervous system. The brain areas that are affected influence memory, pleasure, thinking, concentration, movement, coordination, and sensory and time perception. These areas include the amygdala, hippocampus, basal ganglia, and prefrontal cortex. Within those areas are cannabinoid receptors that make up a part of the endocannabinoid system.

Such effects within the nervous system may vary among individuals. Cannabis influences experiences of sexual pleasure and memory in distinctive ways. Studies have observed differences between male and female neuropsychological functioning. While the results have shown little significant differences, limited studies have been undertaken with very small sample sizes.

=== Sexual pleasure ===
A study published in March 2019 observing women using cannabis prior to sex and their sexual function measured outcomes of satisfaction in drive, orgasm, lubrication, dyspareunia, sexual experience, and the frequency of cannabis use on satisfaction. The results of the study show women who used cannabis prior to having sex are more likely to have satisfactory orgasms and an increased sex drive. Women who frequently use cannabis had higher chances of satisfactory orgasms, regardless of whether they used it prior to sex. Such results show cannabis has a positive relationship to increased sexual satisfaction, and such results can be considered in research to develop treatment for female sexual dysfunction. In another study, a large portion of participants reported having increased desire and sexual satisfaction while using cannabis before sex. In contrast, some reported the experience being worse than usual.

=== Memory ===
The orbitofrontal cortex and hippocampus help with the formation of new memories, and cannabinoid receptors are found in these areas. Thus, cannabis will affect abilities regarding memory and learning. While using cannabis to enhance sexual experience and satisfaction, cannabis will also influence perception and sensation. Studies conducted observe neurocognitive behaviour of individuals under the influence of cannabis and the relationship between cannabis with risky behaviour.

Cannabis can have negative effects on learning and memory. Cannabis users show lower spans of attention, concentration, and abstract reasoning than non-users. Cannabis use impairs neurocognitive functioning, and the user may lose the ability to effectively recall or learn while intoxicated. This can hinder responses to the surrounding environment and decision-making, leading to the individual's inability to accurately remember details accurately or their perception of time becomes distorted. While such results are studied, the neurocognitive domains remain inconsistent in results when observing neurocognitive behaviour of users. One study observed the risky behaviour of individuals who use cannabis. The findings of the study revealed that adolescents who use cannabis are more likely to voluntarily engage in unprotected sex repeatedly, while the participants who never used cannabis or started to use cannabis after adolescence were less likely to have unprotected sex.

== Products ==
There are a variety of cannabis-infused sex products, such as lubricants and massage oils containing CBD and THC.
