= International Society for Sexual Medicine =

International Society for Sexual Medicine logo

The International Society for Sexual Medicine (ISSM) is a medical society devoted to the study of the medicine of human sexuality. It publishes four journals, The Journal of Sexual Medicine, Sexual Medicine Open Access, Sexual Medicine Reviews, and Video Journal of Sexual Medicine. It was founded in 1978 and was formerly known as the ISIR/ISSIR.
