= Sexual arousal disorder =

Lack of feeling or response to sexual arousal

Sexual arousal disorder is a condition in which a person has difficulty becoming or staying sexually aroused. This can happen by a lack or absence of sexual fantasies or a lack of physical responses, such as lubrication or sensitivity. The desire for sexual activity in a situation that would normally produce sexual arousal, or the inability to attain or maintain typical responses to sexual arousal. The disorder is found in the DSM-IV this is about wanting sex rather than the body's reaction to it. The condition should not be confused with a sexual desire disorder.

The term is often used in the diagnosis of women (female sexual arousal disorder), while the term erectile dysfunction (ED) is often used for men.

== Signs and symptoms ==
In women, the symptoms of the disorder include:

- Reduced genital arousal, such as insufficient vaginal lubrication.
- Reduced vasocongestion, leading to limited vaginal dilation or lengthening.
- Reduced vasocongestion, contributing to decreased genital tumescence or swelling.
- Diminished sensation, including reduced genital or nipple sensation.

However, whether lack of physiological arousal is a reliable symptom of the disorder is questionable, as research shows that women with arousal and without arousal deficits can display similar physiological responses during erotic stimuli. Therefore doctors cannot depend solely on physical arousal signs and must incorporate patient reported outcomes and contextual factors to reach an accurate diagnosis.

== Causes ==
Contrary to the assumption, that sexual arousal disorders stems only from a lack of physical arousal, research shows that many difficulties originate in social-psychological factors rather than biology alone. Psychological and emotional factors, such as depression, anger, and stress, or unresolved trauma. Along with relationship dynamics like trust, communication, and emotional safety, play a significant role in shaping arousal. Cultural expectations, body image concerns, and media influences can also affect desire, while situational factors, such as a lack of interest in a specific partner or changes in desire over time, further contribute to these patterns.

Biological causes may include depleted hormones, reduced regional blood flow, and nerve damage; and drug use. The lack of sexual arousal may be due to a general lack of sexual desire or due to a lack of sexual desire for the current partner (i.e., situational). A person may always have had no or low sexual desire or the lack of desire may have been acquired during the person's life.

Certain medications like SSRIs may contribute to a loss of sexual arousal, either while taking the medication or during withdrawal. In seemingly rare cases, SSRIs have been reported to cause a reduction in sexual arousal that last months or years after discontinuation, a condition termed post-SSRI sexual dysfunction (PSSD).

== Diagnosis ==
A psychologist will first consider any psychological or emotional problems; while a sex therapist will examine relationship issues; after which a medical doctor will investigate medical causes for the disorder. In order to receive this diagnosis, a woman must, for at least 6 months, report at least 3 of the following symptoms: absent or significantly reduced interest in sexual activity, in sexual or erotic thoughts or fantasies, in initiation of sex or receptiveness to sex, in excitement or pleasure in most sexual encounters, in sexual responsiveness to erotic cues, or in genital or non-genital responses to sexual activity. This can be either lifelong or acquired.

== Treatment ==
Treatment for sexual arousal disorder varies by cause and may include medical interventions, therapeutic approaches, or lifestyle and physical methods that support arousal and sexual well being.

Medical treatment:

- Bremelanotide (formerly PT-141) is being studied in clinical tests to increase sexual desire in women. In 2014, Palatin, the company developing the drug, announced the beginning of a Phase 3 clinical trial to determine its effectiveness.
- Viagra, may be appropriate.

Therapeutic approaches:

- Cognitive-behavioral therapy (CBT): Helps address anxiety, negative beliefs, stress, or past experiences that interfere with arousal, and supports healthier sexual responses.
- Sensate-focus exercises: Gradual, guided touch exercises that reduce performance pressure and help individuals reconnect with pleasurable sensations.
- Couples therapy: Improves communication, emotional closeness, trust, and relationship dynamics that strongly influence secual arousal.
- Sexual education and guided self-exploration: Involves learning about ones's body, clitoral stimulation, and personal arousal patterns, which reduces anxiety and increases comfort with sexual pleasure.
- Gradual desensitization techniques: Includes controlled use of dilators to reduce fear, tension, or pain that may be blocking arousal.

Lifestyle adjustments/ Physical treatments:

- Pelvic-floor physical therapy: Addresses muscle tension or discomfort that interferes with arousal; strengthening or relaxing these muscles can enhances comfort and sexual responsiveness.
- Mindfulness and relaxation strategies: Reduce stress, increase body awareness, and foster a more positive emotional environment for sexual arousal.
- Vibrators have also been found to be effective at addressing sexual arousal disorder. Sometimes described as a massager, the vibrator is used on the body to produce sexual stimulation. Examples of FDA registered vibrators for sexual arousal disorder include MysteryVibe's Crescendo.

== See also ==
- Erectile dysfunction
- Female sexual arousal disorder
- Hypoactive sexual desire disorder
