= Delayed ejaculation =

Male inability or persistent difficulty in achieving orgasm

- Other names: Retarded ejaculation, inhibited ejaculation
- Specialty: Urology

Delayed ejaculation (DE) is a man's inability or persistent difficulty in achieving orgasm, despite typical sexual desire and sexual stimulation. Generally, a man can reach orgasm within a few minutes of active thrusting during sexual intercourse, whereas a man with delayed ejaculation either does not have orgasms at all or cannot have an orgasm until after prolonged intercourse which might last for 22 minutes or more. Delayed ejaculation is closely related to anorgasmia.

In the Diagnostic and Statistical Manual of Mental Disorders, Fifth Edition, the definition of DE requires 1 of 2 symptoms: either a marked delay in or a marked infrequency or absence of ejaculation on 75% to 100% of occasions for at least 6 months of partnered sexual activity without the individual desiring delay, and causing significant distress to the individual. DE is meant to describe any and all of the ejaculatory disorders that result in a delay or absence of ejaculation.

The Third International Consultation on Sexual Medicine defined DE as an intravaginal ejaculation latency time threshold beyond 20 to 25 minutes of sexual activity, as well as negative personal consequences such as bother or distress. Of note, most men's intravaginal ejaculation latency time range is approximately 4 to 10 minutes. While ejaculatory latency and control were significant criteria to differentiate men with DE from those without ejaculatory disorders, bother/distress did not emerge as a significant factor.

Delayed ejaculation is the least common of the male sexual dysfunctions, and can result as a side effect of some medications. In one survey, 8% of men reported being unable to achieve orgasm over a two-month period or longer in the previous year. DEs are either primary and lifelong or acquired. Acquired DEs may be situational. While most men do experience occasional or short term delayed ejaculation issues, the prevalence of lifelong DE and acquired long-term DE is estimated around 1% and 4%, respectively.

== Signs and symptoms ==
Delayed ejaculation can be mild (men who still experience orgasm during intercourse, but only under certain conditions), moderate (cannot ejaculate during intercourse, but can during fellatio or a handjob), severe (can ejaculate only when alone), or most severe (cannot ejaculate at all). All forms may result in a sense of sexual frustration. In most cases, delayed ejaculation presents the condition in which the man can climax and ejaculate only during masturbation, but not during sexual intercourse. As of 2015, the DSM-V uses the term "delayed ejaculation" instead of older terms such as "inhibited ejaculation", "impotent ejaculation" or "retarded ejaculation". To determine what amount of time counts as delayed, one source uses a measurement of the mean time for a man to achieve ejaculation in a study of 500 couples having heterosexual vaginal intercourse, which was 8 minutes (with a standard deviation of 7.1 minutes). Due to men's reputation for being reliably able to ejaculate during sex, in cases where a man faces delayed ejaculation, the woman may perceive that it is due to her not being attractive or due to a fault in her sexual techniques. A 2023 survey of sex workers by the journal Mankind Quarterly suggested that black men on average take the longest to ejaculate.

== Causes ==
The etiologies of delayed ejaculation can be age-related, organic, psychological, or pharmacological.

Primary lifelong DEs are poorly understood and rarely explained by few congenital anatomic causes (viz., Müllerian duct cyst, Wolffian duct abnormalities, prune belly syndrome, imperforate anus, congenital ejaculatory duct obstruction, genetic abnormalities including cystic fibrosis, etc.)

- Anatomic causes (acquired ejaculatory duct obstruction)
- Infective/Inflammation (residual damage from acute infections, chronic infections, urethritis, prostatitis, orchitis, genitourinary tuberculosis, schistosomiasis, lichen sclerosis, etc.)
- Neurogenic causes (diabetic autonomic neuropathy, spinal cord or nerve root injury from trauma or disc prolapse, multiple sclerosis, etc.). DE can be due to the injury to pelvic nerves responsible for orgasm from trauma as a result of pelvic surgery (viz., prostate surgery including transurethral resection of prostate and bladder neck incision, proctocolectomy, bilateral sympathectomy, abdominal aortic aneurysmectomy, para-aortic lymphadenectomy etc.). Some men report a lack of sensation in the nerves of the glans penis, which may or may not be related to external factors, including a history of circumcision.
- Some researchers believe that circumcision has a negative effect on men's ejaculation during sex, while others believe that circumcision has no effect. Those who believe in the negative effects of circumcision, such as a reduction of sexual sensitivity in the penis, claim that the part of the penis that is removed during circumcision is one of the most important and sensitive parts involved in receiving sexual pleasure, and that after its removal, sexual pleasure decreases. However, researchers who argue against the negative effects of circumcision on men's sexual pleasure, citing the research and conclusions of international medical bodies such as the World Health Organization and important academic centers, state that circumcision does not have a noticeable effect on the sensitivity of the penis.
- Endocrine (hypogonadism, pituitary disorders such as hyperprolactinaemia and Cushing's disease, thyroid disorders, etc.). Although low testosterone level had been considered a risk factor in the past, more recent studies have not confirmed any association between ejaculation times and serum testosterone levels.
- Delayed ejaculation is a possible side effect of alcohol and certain medications, including antipsychotics, antidepressants including selective serotonin reuptake inhibitors (SSRIs), opiates such as morphine or oxycodone, many benzodiazepines such as Valium or Xanax, and certain antihypertensives including thiazide diuretics, alpha-adrenergic blockers and ganglion blockers. Although they may increase sexual desire, stimulants such as amphetamines and cocaine have an inhibitory effect on ejaculation, and can cause erectile dysfunction and reduced penile sensitivity via their vasoconstrictive effects.
- Psychological (acute psychological distress, relationship distress, psychosexual skill deficit, disconnect between arousal and sexual situations, masturbation style and frequency, etc.)
  - Psychological and lifestyle factors have been discussed as potential contributors, including insufficient sleep, distraction due to worry, distraction from the environment, anxiety about pleasing their partner and anxiety about relationship problems.
  - Religious guilt over sex can cause delayed ejaculation.
  - "Spectatoring", the problem of perceiving sex as a performance rather than a mutual experience and process of pleasure "in the moment" can cause delayed ejaculation.
  - Men who are solely aroused by sexual fetishes may be unable to ejaculate from regular intercourse.
  - "Idiosyncratic masturbation" (also known as "idiosyncratic masturbatory style") and lack of desire for stimuli are also proposed risk factors for DE. An idiosyncratic style is defined as a technique not easily duplicated by a partner utilizing their hand, mouth, anus, or vagina. In these patients, delayed ejaculation is adaptation to a certain masturbatory technique. In 1998, psychologist Lawrence Sank wrote about "traumatic masturbatory syndrome", when the sensations a man feels when masturbating may bear little resemblance to the sensations he experiences during intercourse. Factors such as pressure, angle and grip during masturbation can make for an experience so different from sex with a partner that the ability to ejaculate is reduced or eliminated. One in three men with DE report idiosyncratic masturbation. Also, high-frequency masturbation is associated with prolonged DE in penetrative sex with the partner accounting for another one third of the cases. Fantasy/partner disparity – that is to say, variant sexual fantasy during masturbation that was not incorporated into sex with their partner – accounted for one in five DEs. According to the DSM-5-TR, "Delayed ejaculation is associated with highly frequent masturbation, use of masturbation techniques not easily duplicated by a partner, and marked disparities between sexual fantasies during masturbation and the reality of sex with a partner."
  - Intravaginal ejaculation disorder is a peculiar Japanese case, but is very similar to "traumatic masturbatory syndrome", which is also mainly caused by intense masturbation.

== Diagnosis ==
Diagnosis and management of DE warrant one of the most comprehensive medical evaluation in sexual health assessment that includes a full medical and sexual history performed along with a detailed physical examination. Understanding the quality of the sexual response cycle (desire, arousal, ejaculation, orgasm, and refractory period); details of the ejaculatory response, sensation, frequency, and sexual activity/techniques; cultural context and history of the disorder; partner's assessment of the disorder and if the partner has any sexual dysfunction themselves; and the overall satisfaction of the sexual relationship are all important to garner during history-taking.

Relatively normal latency to orgasm with self masturbation as compared to insertive or intravaginal ejaculation latency time reasonably rules out most of the organic causes of DEs.

== Treatment ==
Primary, lifelong DEs are poorly understood and hence less well studied. Organic causes in the acquired DEs should be addressed promptly. Retraining masturbatory practices and re-calibrating the mismatch of sexual fantasies with arousal are essential when these are contributing to DE. Techniques geared towards reduction of anxiety are important skills that can help overcome performance anxiety, as this can often interrupt the natural erectile function through orgasmic progression.

=== Sex therapy ===
Therapy usually involves homework assignments and exercises intended to help a man get used to having orgasms through insertional intercourse, vaginal, anal, or oral, that is through the way to which he is not accustomed. Commonly, the couple is advised to go through three stages. At the first stage, a man masturbates in the presence of his partner. Sometimes, this is not an easy matter, as a man may be used to having orgasms alone. After a man learns to ejaculate in the presence of his partner, the man's hand is replaced with the hand of his partner. In the final stage, the receptive partner inserts the insertive partner's penis into the partner's vagina, anus, or mouth as soon as the ejaculation is felt to be imminent. Thus, a man gradually learns to ejaculate inside the desired orifice by an incremental process.

=== Medication ===
There is as yet no reliable medication for all cases of delayed ejaculation. Some studies have found that PDE5 inhibitors such as Viagra have little effect. Viagra can have a delaying effect on ejaculation, possibly through additional effect of nitric oxide in the brain, decrease of sensitivity in the head of the penis, or increase in confidence.

Limited data has shown that the drug amantadine may help to relieve SSRI-induced orgasmic dysfunction. Cyproheptadine, buspirone, stimulants such as amphetamines (including the antidepressant bupropion), nefazodone has been used to treat SSRI-induced anorgasmia. Reducing the SSRI dosage may also resolve anorgasmia problems. Yohimbine has been shown to be effective in the treatment of orgasmic dysfunction in men.

== See also ==
- Anorgasmia
- Edging (sexual practice)
- Premature ejaculation
- Retrograde ejaculation
- Sexual repression

== Bibliography ==
- Ahmady, Kameel; et al. (2023). Blade of Tradition in the Name of Religion: A Phenomenological Investigation into Male Circumcision in Iran. Avaye Buf. ISBN 978-87-94295-53-6.
- Wincze, John P; Weisberg, Risa B. (2015). "4. Delayed Ejaculation". Sexual Dysfunction: A Guide for Assessment and Treatment. Guilford Publications. pp. 38–45. ISBN 978-1-4625-2061-9. OCLC 1475740918.
- Strassberg, D.S.; Mackaronis, J.E.; Perelman, M.A. (2014). "Part III Other Clinical Syndromes 15. Sexual Dysfunctions". In Blaney, Paul H; Krueger, Robert F.; Millon, Theodore (eds.). Oxford Textbook of Psychopathology. Oxford University Press. pp. 421–462. ISBN 978-0-19-981184-7. OCLC 1475733343.
