= The Journal of Sexual Medicine =

- Discipline: Sexology, urology
- Language: English
- Edited by: Landon Trost (2025 onwards); John P. Mulhall (2015 - 2024); Irwin Goldstein (2004 - 2014)

Publication details
- History: 2004–present
- Publisher: OUP (2023 onwards); Elsevier (2015 - 2022); Wiley (2009 - 2014)
- Frequency: Monthly
- Impact factor: 3.802 (2020)

Standard abbreviations
- ISO 4: J. Sex. Med.

Indexing
- CODEN: JSMOAN
- ISSN: 1743-6095 (print); 1743-6109 (web)
- LCCN: 2004243877
- OCLC no.: 56519822

Links
- Journal homepage; Journal homepage at Elsevier; Journal homepage at Wiley Online Library

The Journal of Sexual Medicine (JSM) is a peer-reviewed medical journal published on behalf of the International Society for Sexual Medicine. Besides the latter society, it is also an official journal for the International Society for the Study of Women's Sexual Health. The editor-in-chief is Landon Trost. The related open access journal, Sexual Medicine, was launched in 2013.

The journal was published by Wiley between 2009 and 2014, and by Elsevier between 2015 and 2022. Since 2023 the publisher was OUP.

== Contents ==
The Journal of Sexual Medicine covers basic science and clinical research studies in the psychological and biological aspects of male and female sexual function and dysfunction. It publishes articles in the following categories:

- Original research articles
- Case reports
- Review articles
- Commentaries
- Editorials
- Letters to the Editor

== Abstracting and indexing ==
The journal is abstracted and indexed in Academic Search, Chemical Abstracts Service, Current Contents/Clinical Medicine, EMBASE, Index Medicus/MEDLINE, PubMed, PsycINFO, and the Science Citation Index Expanded. According to the Journal Citation Reports, the journal has a 2020 impact factor of 3.802, ranking it 22nd out of 85 journals in the category "Urology & Nephrology".
