= Iich'aa =

Navajo Indian culture-bound syndrome

Iich'aa (Navajo: Iichʼąh, pronounced “eech aaw”, no inflexion) is a culture-bound syndrome found in the Navajo Native American culture. Symptoms include epileptic behaviour (nervousness, convulsions), loss of self-control, self-destructive behaviour and fits of violence and rage.

It can, together with other culture-bound syndromes: notably amok (Indonesian), gila mengamok (Malay), cafard (Polynesian) or mal de pelea (Puerto-Rican), be grouped in the taxon SMAS syndrome (Sudden Mass Assault Syndrome).

== Mothway ==
=== The Mothway myth ===
Iich’aa translates to “moth craziness” or “taboo-breaking”, which refers to the ancestral Navajo beliefs about this disorder. The literal translation of iich’aa is “one who falls into the fire”. Attraction to light and fire is a characteristic of the moth. The moth's behaviour, in Navajo storytelling, is said to be a consequence of butterfly people (a mythical population) having “gone wild” after committing incest.

The symptoms of iich’aa are said to be caused by the violation of the taboo of brother-sister incest. This may or may not be scientifically correct (as inbreeding, in general, can lead to a higher possibility of congenital birth defects especially in small populations, however, it hasn't been proved in the specific case of iich’aa). However, the myth serves the prohibition of incest among the Navajo.

=== The Mothway healing ceremony ===
Mothway is also the name of the healing ceremony used to heal iich’aa between 1940 and 1957. Mothway is part of the subgroup Mountain Chant, itself part of the subgroup Holyway of Chantways.

Navajo ceremonies are divided between chantways and rites. Chantways are characterized by a rattle accompanying the singing of a ceremony. The three types of Chantways are Holyway, Lifeway and Evilway. Holyways focus on the restoration of good.

Mothway was controversial amongst Navajo, associated with witchcraft, and thus soon became extinct. Descriptions report the patients wearing coyote skins (animals associated with incest in Navajo culture) and the performance of sexual intercourse.

== Native American views on mental illness and diagnostic ==
The DSM-IV-TR Glossary of Culture-Bound Syndromes includes the following disorders specific to Native Americans (ordered here by decreasing frequency of diagnostic^{]}): susto, “fright” or “soul loss”; dissociative trance disorder; spirit possession; mental illness due to witchcraft; ghost sickness; iich’aa and piblotoq.

According to the Thomason survey on the assessment and diagnosis of American Indian and Alaska Native (AIAN) clients, most clinicians (60%) believe that counsellors should assess their Native clients’ acculturation type to be able to make an accurate diagnostic using the ”patient explanatory model” of disease (framing of the disorder in concordance with the patient's values and beliefs) and prescribe the right treatment. The acculturation type can range from “traditional”, “marginal”, “bicultural”, “assimilated”, and “pantraditional”. Selecting the right one is important because:

- the syndromes are linked to AIAN culture and not specifically to AIAN genes,
- but mainly, the willingness of the patient to accept the diagnostic and the success rate of the treatment process depends on the framing of the diagnosis, making an appropriate treatment possible.

Historically, before Native Americans were exposed to European colonialism, the concept of “mental illness” per se was unknown. Thus, still today, there is little to no stigma around it in most tribal groups, as limited or no distinction is made between mental and physical symptoms. The view of the American Indian physician and clinical psychologist Mehl-Madrona resumes the discourse “All illness is an illness of the spirit that manifests itself in the body, mind, and emotions” and “We all carry within our souls the capacity to heal ourselves”.

Traditionally, amongst AIAN people, deviant behaviour is treated in one of two ways. Either, if seen as voluntary, scolding and exclusion from the community, as a punishment. Or, if seen as involuntary (such as all the listed syndromes above), a “healing process” begins. The healer listens attentively to the patient, they then creates a metaphor to represent the issues(s), which is in turn used in a ceremony, where the patient takes an active role in “fighting the illness”. Those metaphors are often already set out in storytelling and culturally transmitted through generations, such as in the case of iich’aa being represented by a moth, a symbol of love, temptation, and foolishness in Navajo culture.

Hence, the moth itself isn't related to the syndrome (despite some ancestral stories linking it to contact with a moth, fictional or real), but the moth's erratic behavior is a metaphor for that of the patient, serving a descriptive and sense-making function.

== Controversial DSM-IV-TR classification of AIAN culture-bound syndromes ==
The DSM-IV-TR definition might be well-meaning, as a culture-bound syndrome is a “recurrent, locality-specific patterns of aberrant behavior and troubling experience;” and a “localized, folk diagnostic” category. However, two main points of critic arise. They might have been addressed by the renaming into “cultural concepts of distress” in the DSM-5, not listing “some of the best-studied culture-bound syndromes and idioms of distress that may be encountered in clinical practice” as in the DSM-IV-TR.

1. The existence of some of these symptoms hasn't been supported by any contemporary data. For example, pibloktoq or “Arctic hysteria” has only been reported in 40 cases throughout history and has recently been called out as a culture shock reported by European explorers, rather than a disorder rooted in Inuit culture. The Thomason survey indeed reported that 71% of the respondents (specialising in Native American patients) have never diagnosed a client as having a culture-bound syndrome. Comments indicate that professionals are not convinced of the “accuracy or thoroughness” of this classification.
2. The separation between general forms of psychopathology and culture-bound syndromes stigmatises and discriminates minorities. These conditions are not reimbursed by third-party payers, which can affect diagnosis and access to treatment^{.} This is especially problematic because it only seems to apply to non-western syndromes. Western culture-bound syndromes, as for instance “anorexia nervosa”, don't get the same stigma.

Thus, it is debated whether this separate category is even needed. Culture can affect the experience and expression of mental disorders, hence, a consensus could be that general forms of psychopathology might be universal, but the ways that these syndromes are expressed are determined by cultural values, norms, and traditions. Then, iich’aa, might be a local name, for a shared cross-cultural syndrome.

== Lack of research ==
There is still a lot of research to be done to explore the neurological aspect, genetical predispositions, and environmental effects regarding iich’aa. The demand for AIAN related issues hasn't yet been met with necessary funding and interest of the general public.
