= Grisi siknis =

Culture-bound syndrome of Central America

Grisi siknis (in Miskito language, from English, means "crazy sickness") is a contagious, culture-bound syndrome that occurs predominantly among the Miskito people of eastern Central America, and affects mainly young women. It is also known as "grisi munaia", "Chipil siknis", and "Nil siknis". More recently, cases occurring amongst people of Spanish descent have also been reported.

== Grisi siknis in relation to culturally bound syndromes ==
Joseph Westermeyer, head of psychiatry at the University of Oklahoma, states that a culturally bound syndrome is defined as "certain trance-like disturbances [that] occur with unusual frequencies in certain societies". These syndromes, he says, actually occur in a wide variety of cultures separated by great distance that have similar symptoms including "fear, anxiety, amnesia, aimless escape, psychophysiological symptoms, social withdrawal, behavioral deviance and nondirected violence". However, these symptoms are not confined to culturally bound syndromes, as others, such as "personality disorder, neurasthenia, crisis/judgment disorders, organic brain syndromes, drug-induced delirium, major depression, mania, schizophreniform and schizophrenia" might constitute the true psychiatric diagnosis." Because of these cross-cultural symptoms, it is argued that these syndromes are not necessarily unique". and that applying the term ‘culturally bound’ to them hampers science's ability to explore them on the same level as other psychological problems. Outbreaks of these symptoms are sporadic and epidemic." Some culturally bound syndromes, in addition to grisi siknis, include:

- Amok: Among Malay, Indonesian or Pacific Islander males
- Anthropophobia in Japan
- Cathard in Polynesia
- Chakore among Ngawbere of Panama
- Falling-out, among African-Americans or in the Bahamas
- Fits in India
- Frenzy witchcraft (among the Navajo)
- Indisposition (disease) in Haiti
- Koro among Asian males
- Latah among Southeast Asian females
- Mal de pelea in Puerto Rico
- Pibloktoq or arctic hysteria among Inuit
- Resignation syndrome among refugees in Sweden
- Wild-man behavior in New Guinea

Although grisi siknis behaves like a virus, researchers have not been able to trace anything irregular in the blood samples of victims.

According to the American Psychiatry Association, pibloktoq, "frenzy" witchcraft, chakore and amok, are all, like grisi siknis, classified as "running" syndromes, in that they contain "sudden high-level activity, [a] trance-like state, potentially dangerous behavior in the form of running [and] exhaustion, sleep [and/or] amnesia". It is generally applied to purposeless roving.

In addition, Dr. Richard Castillo, as quoted by Dr. C. George Boeree, believes that amok (with very similar symptoms to grisi siknis), pibloktoq, latah, "falling out", "indisposition", and the "fits" are all related to impulse control disorders, and thus are associated with trichotillomania, compulsive gambling, pyromania, and kleptomania in Western medicine.

== Grisi siknis in relation to Western medicine ==
According to the American Psychiatric Association, a Western medical condition similar in many aspects to culturally bound syndromes, particularly the "running" syndromes, of which grisi siknis is part, is dissociative (or psychogenic) fugue. In any fugal state, a person appears normal, but has amnesia or identity forgetfulness. Dissociative fugue is distinguished by impulsive travel and amnesia, identity uncertainty, stress, and impediment to normal social function, all of which must not be influenced by substance intake. It is most often related to intense emotional stress and occurs randomly. However, some argue that "running" syndromes are really not dissociative fugue, and have no proper Western medical classification. Others contend that associating culturally bound symptoms with known ailments severely limits the discovery of new psychiatric disorders in folk culture. Edgardo Ruiz, PhD at the University of Pittsburgh argues that grisi siknis does not correlate with Western scientific cultural perspectives, and the cross-cultural translation of symptoms is an inaccurate device wherewith to understand the disease.

== Signs and symptoms ==
Symptoms of grisi siknis vary, but there is a distinct set of central characteristics. Most of the victims are young girls from 15 to 18 years old. The attacks are prefaced by headaches, dizziness, anxiety, nausea, irrational anger and/or fear. During the attack, the "victim loses consciousness" and falls to the ground, subsequently running away, which running Dennis calls "perhaps the most distinctive defining characteristic of grisi siknis behavior". The victim may view other people as devils, feel no pain for bodily injuries and have absolute amnesia regarding their physical circumstances. Some grab machetes or broken bottles to wave off unseen assailants. Other victims are reported to have performed superhuman feats, vomited strange objects such as spiders, hair and coins and spoken in tongues. In some cases the semi-conscious victim will speak the names of the next to be infected, although it is not always accurate. It is still highly contagious. During attacks, victims report mental visions in which devils or evil spirits come for them, and have sex with them. These visions also include anything from horrifying nightmares to pleasant experiences; not all cases involve sexual encounters. Attacks occur anywhere from multiple times a day to rarely when one is infected with grisi siknis. A person typically remains with the disease for several months to a year without medical attention, although some cases have been documented to recur for much longer.

== Causes ==
=== Miskito theories ===
Miskito tradition, according to Dennis, holds that grisi siknis is caused by possession by evil spirits. This belief stems from the combination of traditional Native American animism. and Miskito Christian idea of the devil. When epidemic outbreaks of the disease occur, the Miskito hold that it is the result of an imbalance with spirits, says Nicola Ross, a reporter for The Walrus magazine, which predicament they believe to be caused by a dilman or evil sorcerer.

=== Western theories ===
There is no definitively known cause of grisi siknis, although there are some theories that attempt to explain its origin. Although it has no known organic cause, says Dennis, grisi siknis still "follow[s] the classic model for contagious disease". Dennis claims that grisi siknis is the source of the emotionally volatile Miskito culture, saying "it is clear that grisi siknis is related to emotional upset, worry, fear and general anxiety", while microorganisms, if involved, are intermediate. Dr. Ronald C. Simons, professor emeritus of psychiatry and anthropology at Michigan State University, as quoted by Nicola Ross in The Walrus magazine, upholds this argument, proposing that grisi siknis is caused by poverty and stress among the Miskito. Culturally bound syndromes, Simons says, are often strongly influenced by behavior and experience and have become a local way of expressing misfortune. Dr. Wolfgang Jilek, of the University of British Columbia's psychiatry department, also quoted by Ross in The Walrus, calls culturally bound syndromes "real" despite a general lack of evidence for organic causes. They are primarily the result of trauma and stress, Jilek claims, that end in mental dissociation problems. Susan Kellogg, Associate Professor and Chair of the History Department at the University of Houston, says that grisi siknis is the result of the cultural "physical and emotional stresses" that Miskito women endure. Shlomo Ariel, co-director of the Integrative Psychotherapy Center in Ramat Gan, Israel, says that such disorders are the product of the culture, delineates acceptable coping mechanisms for dealing with external or internal changes. In a typical homeostatic function, Ariel says, "emotional or behavioral disorders in the individual are defined as such by the culture", which culture subsequently imposes treatment in order to restore equilibrium. Grisi siknis can be considered a ritualized behavior associated with the adolescent to adult transition among the Miskito, says Mark Jamieson, professor of social anthropology at the University of Manchester. Girls in Miskito culture, claims Jamieson, are faced with the culturally inconsistent task of attracting a husband sexually while remaining safe and pure to maintain societal status quo. The contradictory familial pressures to both protect and marry off the daughter adds to this. Thus, says Shlomo, "the syndrome may be viewed as a safety valve" to maintain equilibrium between these conflicting pressures. Miskito girls express transitional sexuality through the syndrome while maintaining social purity, with the culture holding the victims blameless for their actions while attacked by the disease.

== Diagnosis ==
=== Description ===
According to Dr. Phil Dennis of Texas Tech University, grisi siknis is typically characterized by longer periods of anxiety, nausea, dizziness, irrational anger and fear, interlaced with short periods of rapid frenzy, in which the victim "lose[s] consciousness, believe[s] that devils beat them and have sexual relations with them" and runs away.

Often the outbreak of the syndrome is violent in nature, with victims grabbing weapons, attacking unseen enemies and/or hurting themselves.

The causes of grisi siknis are unknown, says the American Psychological Association, but the prevailing Western theory calls this syndrome a "psychological disorder due to stress, upheaval and despair".

Traditional Miskito belief, says Dennis, holds that grisi siknis is the result of evil spirits or black sorcerers. While Western medicine typically has no effect on those afflicted with the disease, the remedies of Miskito herbalists or witch doctors are often successful in curing grisi siknis.

== Cures ==
Grisi siknis is generally only cured by traditional Miskito healing methods, according to The Journal of the American Botanical Council. In treating the ailment, the Miskito typically follow a hierarchy of remedies, turning first to home-based remedies, second to modern health facilities and finally to curandero or witch doctors, the latter particularly, if evil spirits are believed to be involved. These healers use an assortment of vapor baths, anointing, teas and potions, all of which are organically derived. According to Dennis, the Miskito healers use a variety of undisclosed steamed herbal remedies that are generally more successful than any Western medicine. However, the cures can be counteracted, Dennis says, by exposure to dead people, pregnant women and various meats.

== Notable cases ==
Cases of grisi siknis were registered in Nicaragua in March 2009 in Puerto Cabezas and Siuna where many students of the National Institute of Technology and other schools, suffered attacks. Most of the victims were girls. The Miskito people argued that it was due to the action of black sorcerers to oblige the people to pay the expensive cures. Some scholars in the country conclude that it is due to the extreme poverty that the Miskito people endure and that was worsened by Hurricane Felix of September 2007.
