= Hwabyeong =

Mental illness

- Hangul: 화병
- Hanja: 火病
- RR: hwabyeong
- MR: hwapyŏng

Hwabyeong or Hwapyŏng (Korean: 화병; Hanja: 火病) is a Korean somatization disorder, a mental illness that arises when people are unable to confront their anger as a result of conditions that they perceive to be unfair. Hwabyeong is known as a Korean culture-bound syndrome. Hwabyeong is a colloquial name, and it refers to the etiology of the disorder, rather than its symptoms or apparent characteristics. In one survey, 4.1% of the general population in a rural area in South Korea were reported as having hwabyeong. Hwabyeong is similar to Amuk.

== History ==
The first reported case of hwabyeong in Korea was Prince Sado. Lady Hyegyeong, Prince Sado's wife, mentions her husband's anger and symptoms many times in her autobiography as Hua-tseung, meaning fire symptoms. Prince Sado's impulsive actions, thought to stem from unfair treatment from his father, King Yeongjo, led him to threaten officials and often beat his eunuchs. He once walked in his chambers holding the severed head of the eunuch he had killed; killing court officials became common. Prince Sado's hwabyeong was displayed in the movie “The Throne".

Hwabyeong was first discussed in 1967 and 1970, and surveys of the illness were done in rural areas in 1975. In 1983, psychiatrist Keh-Ming Lin from UCLA Medical Center suggested that hwabyeong was a culture-bond syndrome, after treating three Korean-American women.

The word hwabyeong is composed of hwa (the Sino-Korean word 火 for "fire," which can also contextually mean "anger"), and byeong (the Sino-Korean word 病 for "syndrome" or "illness"). It may also be called ulhwabyeong (울화병, 鬱火病), literally "depression anger illness".

== Symptoms ==
Physical symptoms include:

- palpitations
- anorexia
- dry mouth
- insomnia
- thoracic/chest pressure
- respiratory difficulties
- epigastric mass
- headache
- a whole-body sensation of heat (distinct from heat intolerance, a symptom of hyperthyroidism)

Psychological symptoms include:

- being easily startled
- externalization of anger, also known in Korean as "bun" (분, 憤; "eruption of anger"), a Korean culture-related sentiment related to social unfairness
- generally sad mood
- frequent sighing
- a feeling of "eok-ul" (억울, 抑鬱; [feeling of] unfairness)
- being easily agitated
- feelings of guilt
- feelings of impending doom

Diagnosed patients may also have a medical history of prior major depressive disorder, dysthymic disorder, anxiety disorders, somatoform disorders, or adjustment disorder according to the Diagnostic and Statistical Manual of Mental Disorders, fourth edition (DSM-IV) criteria.

Diagnosed patients are most likely to be middle-aged post-menopausal women with low socio-economic status.

== Causes ==
Underlying causes may include:

- prior instances of major depressive disorder
- prior instances of anxiety disorder
- prior instances of adjustment disorder
- prior instances of other somatoform disorders
- repression of feelings of anger/resentment arising from past events

Triggering causes are typically external events, including:

- familial stressors such as spousal infidelity or conflict with in-laws
- witnessing acts/actions/phenomena that conflict with one's own moral and/or ethical principles

The syndrome itself is believed to be the result of the continued repression of feelings of anger without addressing their source. In holistic medicine the containment of anger in hwabyeong disturbs the balance of the five bodily elements, resulting in the development of psychosomatic symptoms such as panic, insomnia, and depression after a long period of repressed feelings.

It is possible that hormonal imbalances such as those around the time of menopause may also be an underlying cause of hwabyeong in middle-aged women, the most often-diagnosed demographic.

Middle-aged or older women have been reported to be more likely to be diagnosed with hwabyeong than men. 87.5% of women and 12.5% of men experience hwabyeong in 1987 report by (Min, Lee, Kang, Lee, 1987). The disparity for women can be pointed to gender roles in Korean culture, which adds considerable amount of stress. Additional stress of financial, domestic abuse, extramarital affairs, and social stigma can contribute to hwabyeong symptoms.

A study was conducted with late-30s -to middle-60s Korean women, which were separated into two groups: native Korean and Korean immigrants to the United States. The study measured life stress by exploring factors including individual characteristics of stress response (measured by the Stress Response Inventory) and anger regulation (STAXI-Korean version). External environmental characteristics of life stress (measured by Life stress for Korean women) were also factored in. Data of demographic background, age, family structure, financial and employment status, religion, and educational background were recorded to find correlation to hwabyeong levels.

In the conclusion of the study, a slight number of hwabyeong was reported by native Korean compared to Korean immigrant women but with a higher stress response and also life stress than for native Korean women. It concluded that native and immigrant Korean women share overall numeral risk factors for hwabyeong but that they focused on different stress factors. Partial cultural assimilation of western culture is a factor on cognitive response to hwabyeong by employing somatic reactions compared to native Korean women in reacting to more negative thoughts. TSome data supports a slight increase in stress response and anger regulation for Korean immigrants, but data show that both native and immigrant groups having different proportional stress factors. Korean immigrants tend to regulate their anger better than their counterparts, which decreases the effects of hwabyeong.

== Treatment ==
Western doctors are more likely to diagnose it as a kind of stress or depression. The Diagnostic and Statistical Manual of Mental Disorders currently lists hwabyeong among its culture-bound illnesses. Outside of Korea, hwabyeong may be mistaken as a reference to a psychological profile marked by a short temper, or explosive, generally bellicose behavior. To the contrary, hwabyeong is a traditional psychological term that used to refer to a condition characterized by passive suffering. It is roughly comparable to depression and is typically associated with older women. It is important that in diagnosing hwabyeong, the culture of the patient is well understood. Since hwabyeong can often be misdiagnosed as depression, the symptoms and the culture need to be clearly and thoroughly looked into. Once hwabyeong has been diagnosed, past treatments need to be reviewed. Treatments for the patient may then be a combination of pharmacological and therapy-based interventions.

Treatment methods used to combat hwabyeong include psychotherapy, drug treatment, family therapy, and community approaches. To be more successful, psychiatrists might need to incorporate the teachings from traditional and religious healing methods or the use of han-puri, which is the sentiment of resolving, loosening, unraveling, and appeasing negative emotions with positive ones. One example of han-puri would be a mother who has suffered from poverty, less education, a violent husband, or a harsh mother-in-law, which can be solved many years later by the success of her son for whom she had endured hardships and sacrifices.

== See also ==
- Ataque de nervios
- Anger
- Repression
