= Locura (disambiguation) =

Locura, "madness" in Spanish, is a mental disorder characterized as severe chronic psychosis

- Locura, a 2024 album by Italian rapper Lazza
- Locura, album by the Argentine band Virus
- "Locura", track by John Zorn from Filmworks VIII: 1997
- "Locura", song by Inna from Yo

== See also ==
- ¡Qué Locura! hidden camera-comedy television show from Venezuela
