= Suudu =

Culture-specific syndrome in South India

Suudu (Tamil, pronounced [tɕuːdu]) is a culture-specific syndrome of painful urination and pelvic "heat" familiar in South India, especially in the Tamil culture. It occurs in males and females. It is popularly attributed to an increase in the "inner heat" of the body often due to dehydration. It is usually treated by the following.

1. applying a few drops of sesame oil or castor oil in the navel and the pelvic region
2. having an oil massage followed by a warm water bath
3. intake of fenugreek seeds soaked overnight in water

The problem has also been known to exist in other parts of South India and the methods of treatment are also similar.
