= Soul wandering =

Ukamairinek (Inuktitut pronunciation: [?], referred to by patients as soul loss, soul possession, or soul wandering) is a culture-specific disorder occurring among Inuit in the circumpolar regions, characterised by sleep paralysis accompanied by restlessness, anxiety and hallucinations. Prodromal indicators of the condition are transient hallucinatory odours or sounds. Research has described the syndrome as a dissociation reaction, or a possible narcolepsy-cataplexy syndrome. The syndrome concludes with complete remission, usually within a few minutes. It is coded under ICD-10 as F44.88 and G47.4.
