= Frigophobia =

Fear of being cold

- Specialty: Psychology

Frigophobia is a phobia pertaining to the pathological concern of hypothermia. Frigophobia is a psychiatric condition that appears mainly in the Chinese culture. Sufferers of this affliction compulsively bundle up in heavy clothes and blankets, regardless of the ambient air temperature. This disorder has been linked to other psychological disorders such as hypochondriasis and obsessive-compulsive disorder. In a 1975 study among ethnic Chinese in Taiwan, it was noted that frigophobia may be culturally linked to koro, where that disorder causes male sufferers to feel that their penis is retracting into the body due to an insufficiency of "male element" (or yang), male frigophobia sufferers correlate coldness with an over-abundance of "female element" (or yin).

== Definition ==
Frigophobia is defined as a persistent, abnormal, and unwarranted fear of coldness, despite conscious understanding by the phobic individual and reassurance by others that there is no danger. It is also known as cryophobia, cheimaphobia or cheimatophobia.

== Society and culture ==
A case study of a 45-year-old Singaporean housewife with frigophobia concluded that frigophobia is closely related to, and influenced by, cultural beliefs. Generally speaking, in therapy, treatments would consist of using low dose of anxiolytics and antidepressants, and psychological interventions. But usually when Asian women are notified of the illness, they would adopt various measures to recover. These include withdrawal from workforce, avoid exposure to cold air and wind, and dietary precautions. It would be important to consider the patient's cultural beliefs about the "illness" in comparison to the therapist's belief of the illness, and then find a negotiable approach for the treatment.

=== China ===
In China, frigophobia is known as weihanzheng (畏寒症, lit. "coldness-fearing syndrome"). From the standpoint of traditional Chinese beliefs, the disorder is highly influenced by an imbalance of yin (the female element) and yang (the male element). Chinese traditional beliefs also states that working women are particularly susceptible to frigophobia, triggered by a combination of stress, menopause, pregnancy and other disorders such as anemia. During winter, these women are likely to experience coldness in extremities and back pains caused by the disorder.

It is believed that the disorder can be treated using a combination of diet in order to correct an imbalance in the sufferer's yin and yang. Dietary treatments include:

- Chicken soup
- Turnip juice mixed with ginger juice and honey, three times a day
- Red tea with ginger juice and sugar, two times a day
- Foods containing yeast (e.g. bread)
- Spices (e.g. ginger, chili pepper)
- Vinegar diluted in water

It is also believed that the dietary treatment will be more effective if taken in conjunction with an acupuncture routine.

== See also ==
- Culture-bound syndrome
- Fan death
- Genital retraction syndrome
- Traditional Chinese medicine
- Jacob Geller
