= Hi-wa itck =

Mojave syndrome triggered by separation of a loved one

Hi-wa itck (Mohave: hi:wa itck) is a culture-bound syndrome concerning heartbreak mostly associated with the Mohave people. This syndrome is associated with the separation of a loved one with symptoms including insomnia, depression, loss of appetite, and possibly suicide. Hi-wa itck is typically experienced by men, especially older men abandoned by their younger wives. It is similar to the condition of abandonment and rejection sensitivity associated with borderline personality disorder combined with a depressive episode. It is identified under culture-bound syndromes originating in Native America, which also include pibloktoq or Arctic hysteria and wacinko (Oglala Sioux).
