= Locura =

Type of mental disorder

Locura, which translates to "insanity" in Spanish, is a mental disorder characterized as severe chronic psychosis. The term refers to a culture-bound syndrome, found mostly in Latin America and Latin Americans in the United States. Also referred to as ataques de locura (meaning "madness attacks"), it is categorized as a more severe form of nervios ataque de nervios with symptoms appearing similar to those of schizophrenia.

Hispanic families describing affected loved ones with "nervios" often focused on the "agitated behavior" and how it progresses into the belief that the affected loved one will fall more "susceptible to many health problems". Many families, most notably of Hispanic origin, believe that children are more vulnerable to developing such symptoms as their "nerves" (translation from spanish), are more prone to being damaged; a belief that is relatively prevalent amongst such communities.

As the term may have multiple meanings in multiple environments, research on locura is limited and conflicting. The term can be used loosely in Spanish when discussing madness in other psychological meaning, specifically describing a "deviance from the norm due to mental illness." Besides for the implications found in the DSM-IV, the word is not used in English.

== Classification ==
In the fourth edition of the Diagnostic and Statistical Manual of Mental Disorders (DSM-IV), locura is classified as a culture-bound syndrome. Culture-bound syndromes can be found in an appendix of the manual named, Outline for Cultural Formulation and Glossary of Culture-Bound Syndromes. However, the DSM - 5 does not include locura in its equivalent appendix named, Glossary of Cultural Concepts of Distress. One author chooses to describe the symptoms as correlating to a somatoform disorder of conversive type.

== Signs and symptoms ==
Locura is thought to develop during times of stress or vulnerability in one's life, as well as the accumulation of difficulties or traumas. Another possible cause is through the manifestation of supernatural maneuvers, or maleficios (meaning "curses").

The DSM-IV includes symptoms of incoherence, agitation, inability to follow rules of social interaction, unpredictability, and possible violence. Other sources include headache, fainting, convulsive attacks, difficulty in breathing, an urge to run away, hallucinations, and visions of people, visions, or demons.

== History ==
Locura has been examined in an indigenous group in Colombia called Embera. After four members of the Embera community began exhibiting symptoms later described as "repetitive episodes of what resembled a dissociative fugue disorder," a local shaman explained that the outbreak could be attributed to a shaman from a different region. The local shaman attempted their own treatment, but the affected member's symptoms continued and after six months, they eventually chose to seek help in the closest province. Soon after they arrived, their local relatives began to develop the same symptoms. After five more individuals presented similarly, all nine members began seeking forms of treatment including care from different types of religious healers, psychiatrists, and antipsychotic drugs. After none of these tactics proved successful, a shaman from the Chocó province in Colombia was brought to attempt treatment. The shaman's treatments reportedly reduced the frequency of the symptoms greatly in all of the patients and eliminated symptoms completely in two patients.

== See also ==
- Ataques de nervios
- Culture-bound syndrome
