= Susto =

Form of panic attack in Latin American cultures

Susto (Spanish pronunciation: [ˈsusto], Portuguese pronunciation: [ˈsuʃtu]) is a cultural illness primarily among Latin American cultures. It has been found in Mexico, Central America, and among Mexican American communities in the United States. Susto is often referred to as “fright sickness” and is conceptualized as the soul leaving the body of a person as a result of a sudden scare. It is described as a condition of "chronic somatic suffering stemming from emotional trauma or from witnessing traumatic experiences lived by others." Researchers also describe susto as a cultural concept of distress, which means that culture shapes the way people understand, express, and respond to illness.

== Symptoms ==
Susto has roots in Indigenous and colonial traditions that connect health to the soul and emotional balance. It is believed that when someone is suddenly frightened, their soul leaves their body, causing weakness, sadness, and illness. Among the Indigenous peoples of Latin America, in which this illness is most common, susto may be conceptualized as a case of spirit attack. Symptoms of susto are thought to include nervousness, anorexia, insomnia, listlessness, fever, depression, and diarrhea. People who have experienced susto have also reported feelings of sadness, tiredness, loss of appetite, anxiety, and sleeping difficulties. Research shows that susto can appear more often in communities facing stress, poverty, or major life changes, suggesting that the condition reflects both cultural beliefs and emotional distress connected to difficult life experiences.

== Treatment ==
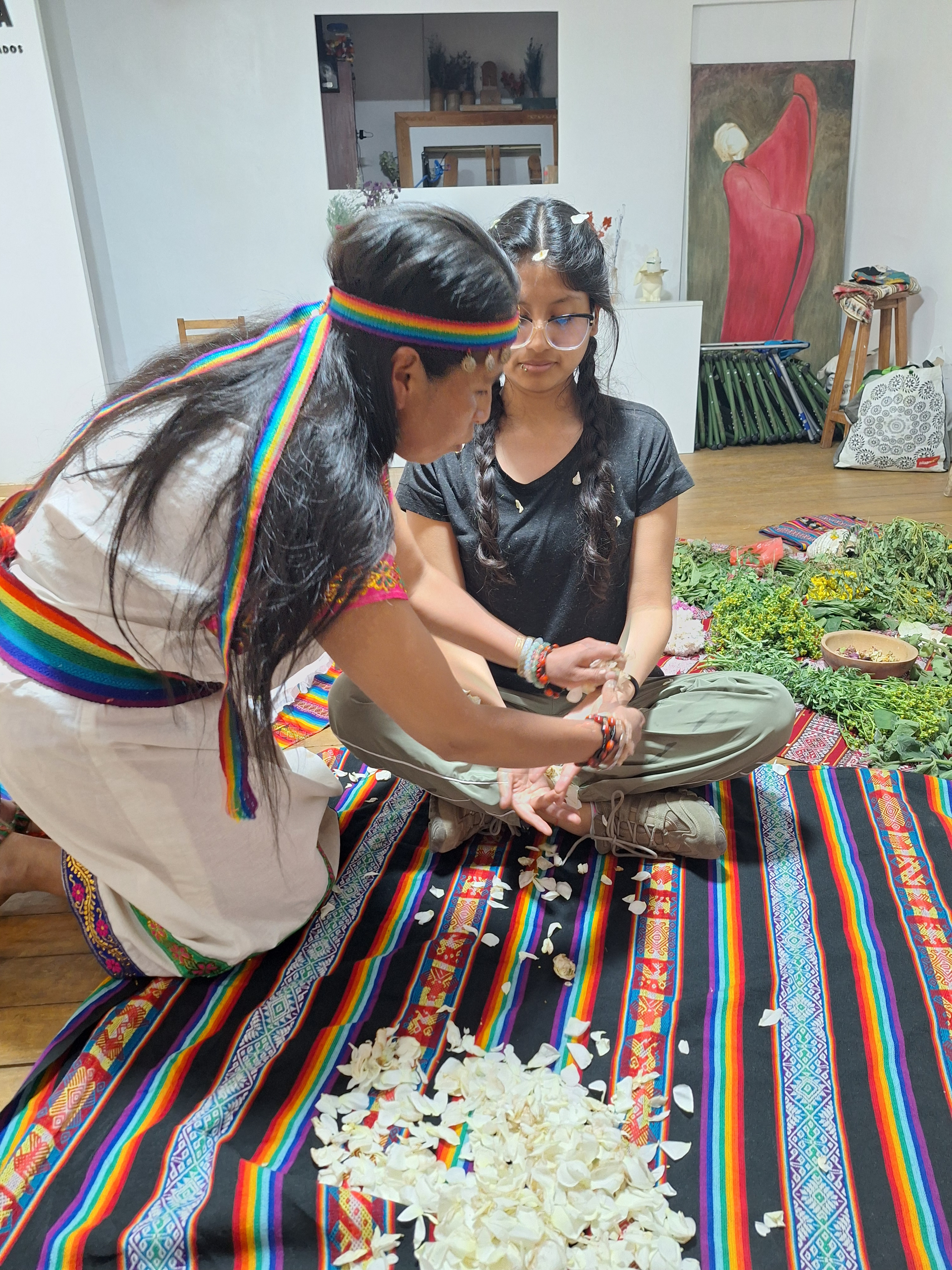
Peruvian women demonstrating traditional herbal treatments for susto.

Treatment for susto is often done by curanderos, or traditional healers, but remedies vary across cultures. In Bolivia, it is said that calling out to the soul at night will lead it back to its body. Leaving out meals, clothing, and other personal items belonging to the affected person is also believed to help with bringing the soul back. This practice has also been observed in Bolivian migrants to other Latin American countries. Other spiritual treatments for susto are rooted in Catholicism, as prayer is also said to be a remedy for the condition.

Various herbal treatments have also been documented, which include rubbing the affected person with an egg or medicinal herbs to cleanse them of the condition. Rubbing a guinea pig on the affected person in order to absorb the perceived illness has also been recorded.

== Classification ==
Susto may be a culturally dependent variation of the symptoms of a panic attack, which is distinct from anxiety and depressive disorders. It has been described as a cultural way of expressing fear, worry, and trauma. The Diagnostic and Statistical Manual of Mental Disorders, Fifth Edition (DSM-5) lists susto as a Cultural Concept of Distress, meaning that a person's emotional experiences are shaped by cultural beliefs and interpretations of illness. Some researchers describe susto as an "idiom of distress," which means people make sense of their symptoms using culturally specific beliefs, such as the idea of soul-loss, rather than clinical terms like panic or anxiety. Because susto is seen as a cultural reaction to fear and stress, its symptoms can be difficult to fit into Western psychiatric categories.

== See also ==
- Psychological trauma
- Falling-out
- Ataque de nervios
