= Kufungisisa =

Cultural syndrome prevalent in Zimbabwe

- Specialty: Psychiatry
- Symptoms: Fatigue, sadness, memory loss, apathy
- Complications: Body aches, pain, headaches, insomnia, stomach ulcers, unintended weight loss
- Causes: trauma, social issues, or spiritual beliefs (ancestral spirits, bewitchment)
- Risk factors: Severe mental and physical health issues
- Treatment: Therapy, social support
- Medication: Antidepressants
- Named after: Zimbabwean word translating of "thinking too much"

Kufungisisa is a culture-bound syndrome prevalent in Zimbabwe similar to anxiety disorders and depression.

Among the Shona, who make up a large part of Zimbabwe's population, kufungisisa is characterized by thinking too much or overthinking a situation. There is a widespread belief that such behavior not only contributes to mental illnesses, but also causes physical discomfort.

Kufungisisa is not listed in the Diagnostic and Statistical Manual of Mental Disorders (DSM).

== Origin ==
It is unclear when the term Kunfungisisa first appeared but it translates to the term "thinking too much".

The concept of "thinking too much" has significant cultural and historical roots in Sub-Saharan Africa, particularly within the Shona language in Zimbabwe. Since the mid-1990s the idiom is used by people across the world to communicate distress.

One of the earliest references to the idiom of "too much thinking" in Sub-Saharan Africa can be found in Peltzer's (1989) research in Malawi on the spirit disorder of vimbuza. The research done by Patel on the Shona idiom of kufungisisa, which was published 1995, represents one of the first in-depth analyses of the idiom as both a cause and a symptom of mental illness and distress.

== Symptoms ==
Kufungisisa presents with symptoms similar to those of depression and anxiety. Affected individuals often find themselves in a poor emotional state.

Psychologically, they may experience persistent fatigue, sadness, forgetfulness, and apathy. Additional symptoms include grief, chronic stress or burnout, low self-esteem, solitude, increased irritability, and a sense of not being oneself. Agitation and inattentiveness is also very common. In more severe cases, symptoms can expand to suicidal thoughts, hallucinations, substance abuse, and psychosis.

Physically, individuals with kufungisisa often report body aches, pain, headaches, insomnia, stomach ulcers, and unintended weight loss.

== Cultural implications ==
In Zimbabwe, kufungisisa translates to “thinking too much” in Shona and is considered a fundamental aspect of mental illness, with 80% of Zimbabweans with common mental illness experiencing it. This concept of “overthinking” as a key experience of different mental illnesses has been observed in various other countries around the world, such as Uganda, Tanzania, Australia (“kulini-kulini”), Nepal, Nicaragua (“pensando much”), Cambodia, and Haiti (“kalkile twop”). Kufungisisa is an idiom that often suggests both interpersonal and social issues and can manifest as a range of physical and mental ailments, such as feelings of negative rumination, pain, irritability, depression, and anxiety.

The term kufungisisa describes both the causes and symptoms of an illness and can encompass afflictions of a mental, spiritual, and social nature. While the term is associated with biomedical constructs of non-psychotic mental illness, it is not simply an equivalent term for anxiety or depression. In psychiatric settings, it has been referred to as a non-specific neurotic mental illness, while the base description is simply “feeling stressed.” Increased usage of kufungisisa can help with acceptance and awareness of the condition.

Symptoms of illnesses such as anxiety and depression can be commonly understood in Zimbabwe using terms such as kufungisisa (‘thinking too much’), kusuwisisa (‘deep sadness’), and moyo unorwadza (‘painful heart’). These cultural terms have been used since the mid-1990s to further research in understanding individuals' experiences with common mental disorders.

=== Impact on female communities ===
Kufungisisa often also presents within female communities in Zimbabwe. The presence of both poverty and patriarchal structures in Zimbabwe can place significant pressure on women in these communities, which can result in the development of mental disorders or kufungisisa. In a study done in the rural area of the Shurugwi District in Zimbabwe, it appeared that the convergence of poverty and patriarchy is where women tend to experience kufungisisa. While women in rural areas of Zimbabwe are no longer physically restricted by colonial rule, they are still confined to their communal areas due to cultural customs and laws that maintain patriarchy as a system of domination within the community. These restrictions and practices help mold women's experience or development of kufungisisa, as they have little control over their household and resources even while their husbands are often absent. Participants described this patriarchal system as obstructing them from being able to play a part in providing household provisioning.

=== Clinical significance ===
While similar idioms and phrases can be found around the globe to describe the general concept of overthinking, there are still notable differences in the scale of what people experience, as well as the different cultural nuances present within different countries and communities. Grouping together terms such as kufungisisa under the umbrella term of “thinking too much” can mean that the different cultural nuances of these terms become lost. Understanding the cultural implications of kufungisisa can be essential for clinicians in understanding the extent of what individuals are experiencing and therefore being able to provide them with care and treatment that is culturally informed. The cultural nuances of kufungisisa are relevant in understanding how cultures and communities deal with mental illness in terms of support and management.

== Related illnesses ==
Kufungisisa shares many symptoms with common mental disorders, namely anxiety disorders and depression. The belief that supernatural factors caused the symptoms is also linked closely to depression.

In low to middle-income countries, common mental disorders are often linked to diagnoses of chronic illnesses, like HIV/AIDS and diabetes. Poor mental health also predicts a faster HIV progression, as common mental disorders, especially depression, make it hard to adhere to regular medication schedules, as are needed in HIV treatment.

Severe forms of common mental disorders, like PTSD, amongst people living with HIV who have a history of trauma are also called “kufungisisa kwe njodzi”, meaning "thinking too much due to trauma". Njodzi is seen as both the cause of these mental health issues and as being linked to ongoing stigma due to their HIV diagnosis. In a Zimbabwean cross-sectional study of people living with HIV, 45% exhibited PTSD symptoms. Generally, the presence of PTSD symptoms, for example intrusion and hyper-arousal, are often acknowledged but treated as a severe form of kufungisisa.

In people with HIV, kufungisisa has also been linked to substance abuse as a coping mechanism.
