= Bold hives =

American folk disease

Bold hives, also known as boll hives, bull hives, bow hives, bone hives, red hives, little red hives, or stretch hives, was a folk illness thought to be fatal to infants in the Appalachian South in the United States and to infants of Black Americans born outside of the South.

== Description ==
The bold hives manifested as an "eruptive skin disease" (thus the "hives"), and/or a croup-like lung disease. Or, it manifested no symptoms at all, and "death always came during the night: the child was found in the morning, dead in its cradle. There was no preliminary fever, vomiting, coughing, or other obvious symptoms of illness—except to those who were wise in folk medicine." Folklorists thus surmise that "bow hives" may have served to explain what is now termed sudden infant death syndrome. A missionary nurse who worked in western North Carolina wrote in 1907, "Among diseases, one of early infancy is hives, to which they attribute errors of diet. There are hives of all sorts and kinds, including a severe and mysterious form known as the boll-hives, in which no hives break out, but the baby for that reason dies and then turns black in spots. This is presumably cerebro-spinal meningitis." Bold hives was not the same thing as urticaria.

To prevent death by boll hives, new babies were "hived" with tisanes of catnip, ground ivy, mullein, hive vine, deerberry, or other substances thought to prevent "hives" from worsening into "bold hives." "Hiving" the baby functioned essentially as an instinctive, ritualized "folk vaccine," warding the baby against death. The belief was that "bold hives will kill you, if they go back in you." Other treatments meant to either induce hives or settle a breakout of hives included bloodletting, cupping, paregoric, whiskey (sometimes mixed with coal oil or asafoetida, delivered orally), something with corn husks, roasted onion broth, "'skillet-bark tea' made from the sooty scrapings off the underside of an iron pan," and "mashed sow bugs mixed with breast milk." Another approach was applying a "poultice of pasture manure" and keeping the baby warm; this would elicit "reddening of the child's skin and probably it will raise blisters, which the family will regard with pleasure, since they will believe that the bold hives are leaving via the irritated skin." Still another method believed to prevent death by bold hives was to "make three little slits in the shoulder flesh with a razor. Warm a horn and put the large end over the slits in the skin. Put beeswax over the small end and make a very small hole in the wax with a pin and suck up through the hole and close it by pinching the wax together. The horn will stay on until it has drawn about a teaspoonful of blood. Then it will fall off. It is this blood that causes the hives. You can see it is all dark and hard."

One scholar writing about health-related beliefs of African-Americans in Michigan in 1983 told "One infant brought into a Michigan pediatrics clinic was admitted to hospital for weight loss at 3 weeks of age. One reason for his failure to thrive was poor caloric intake due to the several bottles of catnip tea he was being given every day. He had not yet broken out in the little red hives, his mother said, and she was concerned about his health."

The hives appear in a novel written in the 1950s about Tennessee mountain people, Hunter's Horn by Harriette Arnow, which is set in a community that clings to "naïve superstitions that range from a reliance on folk remedies for diseases to a belief in witches and...a harsh fundamentalism that rationalizes all human suffering as a prerequisite for an easier life after death." The novel depicts a "theory of bold hives [that] goes back to ancient beliefs in possession by evil spirits...The presumption was that every child is born possessed with a potentially fatal 'something' that must be expelled by way of producing hives before the child reached one month of age."

The term may have been a corruption of bowel hives, a disease that appears in early Scottish medical textbooks. Bowel hives was "commonly pronounced according to the old Scottish dialect bull hives," and then in common use the term seemingly morphed into bold hives.

== See also ==
- Neonatal acne
- Apotropaic magic

== Sources ==
- Allen, Maria Purdon (August 1907). "Missionary Nursing Among the Mountains". Tenth Annual Convention of the Nurses' Associated Alumnæ of the United States: Minutes of the Proceedings. The American Journal of Nursing. 7 (11): 826–831. doi:10.2307/3402739. ISSN 0002-936X. JSTOR 3402739.
- Burnett, Abby (2014). Gone to the Grave: Burial Customs of the Arkansas Ozarks, 1850–1950. Jackson, Mississippi: University Press of Mississippi. ISBN 978-1-62846-111-4. JSTOR j.ctt83jj4j. LCCN 2014016587. OCLC 967267887.
- Cavender, Anthony; Crowder, Steve (2002). "White-Livered Widders and Bad-Blooded Men: Folk Illness and Sexual Disorder in Southern Appalachia". Journal of the History of Sexuality. 11 (4): 637–649. doi:10.1353/sex.2003.0032. ISSN 1043-4070. JSTOR 3704729.
- Crowder, Steve (May 2001). Black Folk Medicine in Southern Appalachia (Master's Sociology thesis). Johnson City, Tennessee: East Tennessee State University.
- Golden, Janet (2017). "'Doctors Don't Do So Much Good': Traditional Practices, Biomedicine, and Infant Care in the 20th-Century United States". Nursing History Review. 25 (1): 86–102. doi:10.1891/1062-8061.25.86. ISSN 1062-8061. PMID 27931271.
- Montgomery, Michael; Heinmiller, Jennifer K. N. (2021). Dictionary of Southern Appalachian English. Chapel Hill: The University of North Carolina Press. ISBN 978-1-4696-6255-8. LCCN 2020051338. OCLC 1196043859.
- Pruitt, Virginia (June 1964). "The Bold Hives in Tennessee". Tennessee Folklore Society Bulletin. XXX (2). Nashville, Tennessee: George Peabody College for Teachers: 69–71 – via Tennessee State Library & Archives.
- Snow, L. F. (December 1983). "Traditional health beliefs and practices among lower class black Americans". The Western Journal of Medicine. 139 (6): 820–828. ISSN 0093-0415. PMC 1011011. PMID 6364570.
- Strain, Catherine (December 2002). Folk Medicine in Southern Appalachian Fiction (Master's English thesis). Johnson City, Tennessee: East Tennessee State University.
