= Bouffée délirante =

Psychiatric diagnosis in French-speaking countries

Bouffée délirante (BD) is an acute and transient psychotic disorder. It is a uniquely French psychiatric diagnostic term with a long history in France and various French speaking nations in the Caribbean (e.g., Haiti, Guadeloupe, Antilles) and Francophone Africa. The term BD was originally coined and described by Valentin Magnan (1835–1916), fell into relative disuse, and was later revived by Henri Ey (1900–1977).

== Terminology ==
The French word bouffée is often translated as a puff or waft (as of air), but can also mean a flash, rush, or surge. Chabrol translates the word délirante as "delusional". Other common dictionary definitions include less useful meanings such as "crazy" or "incoherent". A reasonable English translation of the term bouffée délirante is "delusional flash".

== Description ==
Bouffée délirante is "an acute, brief nonorganic psychosis that typically presents with a sudden onset of fully formed, thematically variable delusions and hallucinations against a background of some degree of clouding of consciousness, unstable and fluctuating affect, and spontaneous recovery with some probability of relapse." The following criteria have been suggested for a diagnosis of BD: a) abrupt onset, b) polymorphic delusions, emotional changes, mood swings, depersonalization, derealization, and/or hallucinations, c) complete remission within weeks or a few months, d) exclusion of organic causation, alcohol or drug use, e) no psychiatric antecedents with the exception of a previous episode of bouffée délirante.

American academic investigators proposed the following definition in 2011: "The French concept of bouffée délirante refers to conditions with a sudden onset marked by prominent delusions with hallucinations, confusion, anxiety and affective symptoms. Symptoms vary rapidly, perhaps even by the hour, and there is a rapid return to the premorbid state of health." A frequently quoted authority on BD, P. Pichot, of the Hôpital Sainte Anne, Paris, provides this description of BD:

1. sudden onset: 'a bolt from the blue'.
2. manifold delusions without recognizable structure and cohesiveness with/without hallucinations.
3. clouding of consciousness associated with emotional instability.
4. absence of physical signs.
5. rapid return to pre-morbid level of functioning.

Pichot's criteria can be refined further with these typical clinical characteristics:

- age: usually between 20 and 40 years of age.
- onset: acute without prior mental illness (with the exception of previous episodes of bouffée délirante).
- past history: no chronic mental disturbance after resolution of the BD episode.
- typical symptoms: delusions and/or hallucinations of any type. Depersonalization/derealization and/or confusion
- depression and/or elation.
- symptoms quite variable from day to day and even hour to hour.
- not due to alcohol, drug use, or organic mental disorder.

== Formal classification ==
In 1968, the French national organization INSERM (Institut National de la Santé et de la Recherche Médicale) classification of mental illness referenced two types of BD in their category 'acute delusional psychoses and confusional states' viz. reactive bouffée délirante and bouffée délirante (Magnan's type). This classification scheme has been largely replaced by the two nosological systems discussed below.

The World Health Organization edition of the International Classification of Diseases 10th edition:version 2019 (ICD-10, CIM-10 en français), lists BD as the subentry "Bouffée délirante without symptoms of schizophrenia or unspecified" under diagnosis code F23: Acute and Transient Psychotic Disorders subsection, F23.0: Acute polymorphic psychotic disorder without symptoms of schizophrenia. It is likely that the use of the term BD in French clinical psychiatry will decline further with the proposed 2022 implementation of ICD-11, which was released in May 2019. In contrast to the ICD-10, the term BD does not appear anywhere in ICD-11. The closest clinical match for BD in the ICD-11 is code 6A23, 'Acute and transient psychotic disorder' which is defined as

acute onset of psychotic symptoms that emerge without a prodrome and reach their maximal severity within two weeks. Symptoms may include delusions, hallucinations, disorganization of thought processes, perplexity or confusion, and disturbances of affect and mood. Catatonia-like psychomotor disturbances may be present. Symptoms typically change rapidly, both in nature and intensity, from day to day, or even within a single day. The duration of the episode does not exceed 3 months, and most commonly lasts from a few days to 1 month. The symptoms are not a manifestation of another health condition (e.g., a brain tumor) and are not due to the effect of a substance or medication on the central nervous system (e.g., corticosteroids), including withdrawal (e.g., alcohol withdrawal).

The Diagnostic and Statistical Manual of Mental Disorders 5th edition (DSM-5) diagnostic category brief psychotic disorder is probably the closest analog of BD. The French term BD is nowhere mentioned in the DSM-5. The diagnosis of bouffée délirante is still in use in the Classification Française des Troubles Mentaux (French Classification of Mental Disorder, CFTM) under the name bouffée délirante aiguë.

== Incidence ==
The frequency of BD diagnoses in French hospitals has been declining due to the widespread acceptance of international classification systems such as the ICD-10 and DSM-5. However, the BD diagnosis has been used as recently as 2019 in Le Groupe Hospitalier Universitaire Paris psychiatrie & neurosciences (GHU Paris), Maison Blanche Bichat XVIII. Older estimates of the incidence of BD in psychiatric hospitalizations range from 1–5%.

Psychiatric admission reviews show that 2–7% of first episode psychotic episodes are due to brief psychotic disorder; here serving as a surrogate diagnosis for BD. Some authors state that the diagnostic category of BD can be eliminated because it can be fully integrated into the 'Polymorphic subgroup of Acute and Transient Psychotic Disorders' of the ICD-10.

== Treatment ==
There are no current published guidelines in the English language psychiatric literature that discuss treatment for BD. A 2019 case of BD from GHU Paris treated the patient with largactil (chlorpromazine). Assuming that BPD is an equivalent diagnosis, treatment depends on the severity of the episode. Mildly affected patients may receive supportive management and observation with additional outpatient therapy. More severe illness may require inpatient hospitalization and pharmacologic treatment with benzodiazepines and/or antipsychotic medication, for example: risperidone, though no clinical trials have examined the efficacy of therapy for BPD.

== Prognosis ==
It is difficult to firmly establish the prognosis of first episode BD patients with respect to progression to other psychiatric illness or relapse to another psychotic episode. This is due to the fact that high quality follow-up studies of large cohorts of BD patients are unavailable in part because of the uncommon nature of the illness and non-standardization of diagnostic methods. Investigators attempting to define the prognosis in BD have used data from similar conditions, i.e. acute transient psychotic disorder (ATPD) and brief psychotic disorder (BPD).

A 2016 meta-analysis involving 11,000 patients estimated the rate of recurrent psychotic episodes in ATPD and BPD patients was 51% at 30 months compared to first episode schizophrenia patients who had an 84% recurrence rate at 36 months. As suggested by the various definitions of BD discussed above, rapid recovery and return to pre-morbid level of function is expected, though quantitative data is lacking.

== Society ==
Psychiatric illnesses comparable to the unique French BD can be seen in the cycloid psychosis of German speaking countries and the psychogenic psychosis in Scandinavia. It has been argued that acute and transient psychoses are more common in African and Afro-Caribbean populations and may be attributable to socio-cultural factors. This has led to the term "culture-bound syndrome". It must be stressed that the term BD long predates any such socio-cultural, ethnic, or regional uses. The African and Caribbean nuances of the diagnosis and presentation of BD has been extensively reviewed by Henry Murphy.

== See also ==
- Brief psychotic disorder
