= Sangue dormido =

Psychological syndrome

This syndrome is found among Portuguese Cape Verde Islanders (and immigrants from there to the United States) and includes pain, numbness, tremor, paralysis, convulsions, stroke, blindness, heart attack, infection, and miscarriage.

— DSM-IV-TR

Sangue dormido (lit. 'sleeping blood') is a psychological syndrome reportedly affecting Cape Verdeans and members of the Cape Verdean diaspora. The condition appears in Appendix I of the revised fourth edition of the Diagnostic and Statistical Manual of Mental Disorders (DSM-IV) as a culture-bound syndrome.

== Background ==
Sangue dormido was first clinically described in a 1981 case study in which a 48-year old Crioulo-speaking woman presented with paralysis, numbness, pain, and tremor of her right arm. She had been in good health when she emigrated to the United States four years previously, but two years before admission had suffered a concussion and bilateral Colles' fracture after an accidental fall. Her symptoms gradually developed after that incident until she finally sought medical attention with the help of her family.

The patient described Cape Verdean folk beliefs in which traumatic injury would cause living blood (sangre vivo) to leak out and coagulate as sleeping blood (sangue dormido) or dead blood (sangue morto), resulting in loss of circulation to the affected area and potentially more serious symptoms caused by blood "backing up" behind the obstruction. She described and requested the traditional Cape Verdean treatment for the condition, namely, the administration of a "calming medicine" and a cross-shaped incision over the wrist to remove the sangue dormido. Medical personnel administered 5 mg of Valium intramuscularly and withdrew 12 cc of blood from a superficial vein in the right wrist, which was allowed to coagulate in a cup and shown to the patient. The patient was greatly relieved by the procedure, experienced complete cessation of numbness and tremor by the next day, and was discharged after additional phlebotomy and the application of cold compresses. At an outpatient visit after five months, the patient reported improvement in motor function of her right arm.

The description given in this case study was adopted largely verbatim by the DSM-IV. Standard psychological and medical reference texts subsequently listed sangue dormido as an example of a culture-bound syndrome.

In 2012, the authors of the original case study published a follow-up in which they stated that after further review, they had not been able to find any empirical or ethnographic evidence of the condition in English-language sources, leaving open the possibility that documentation might exist in Portuguese. The authors suggested additional research with Cape Verdean populations and recommended removing sangue dormido from lists of culture-bound syndromes.

Sangue dormido, like many culture-bound syndromes listed in the DSM-IV, was not among those recognized in the DSM-V, and additionally has not been described in the International Classification of Diseases.
