= Brain fag syndrome =

Collection of symptoms

Brain fag syndrome (BFS) is a term that was used to describe a set of symptoms including difficulty in concentrating and retaining information, head and or neck pains, and eye pain. Brain fag was believed to be most common in adolescents and young adults due to the pressure occurring in life during these years. The term, now outdated, was first used in 19th-century Britain before becoming a colonial description of Nigerian high school and university students in the 1960s. Its consideration as a culture-bound syndrome caused by excessive pressure to be successful among the young is disputed by Ayonrinde (2020).

== Etymology ==
The term 'brain fag' presumably stems from the verb meaning of the word "fag", "To cause (a person, animal, or part of the body) to become tired; to fatigue, wear out" chiefly found in British English.

== Classification ==
BFS was classified in the fourth revision of the Diagnostic and Statistical Manual of Mental Disorders (DSM-IV) as a culture-bound syndrome. Individuals with symptoms of brain fag must be differentiated from those with the syndrome according to the Brain Fag Syndrome Scale (BFSS); Ola et al said it would not be "surpris[ing] if BFS was called an equivalent of either depression or anxiety".

== Causes ==
Brain fag is typically driven in people with high anxiety and people with high stress levels. Morakinyo found in 20 people with BFS an achievement drive that was anxiety-related that led to the use of psychostimulants and consequent sleep deprivation which contributed to cognitive disruption. Omoluabi related BFS to test anxiety.

== Treatment ==
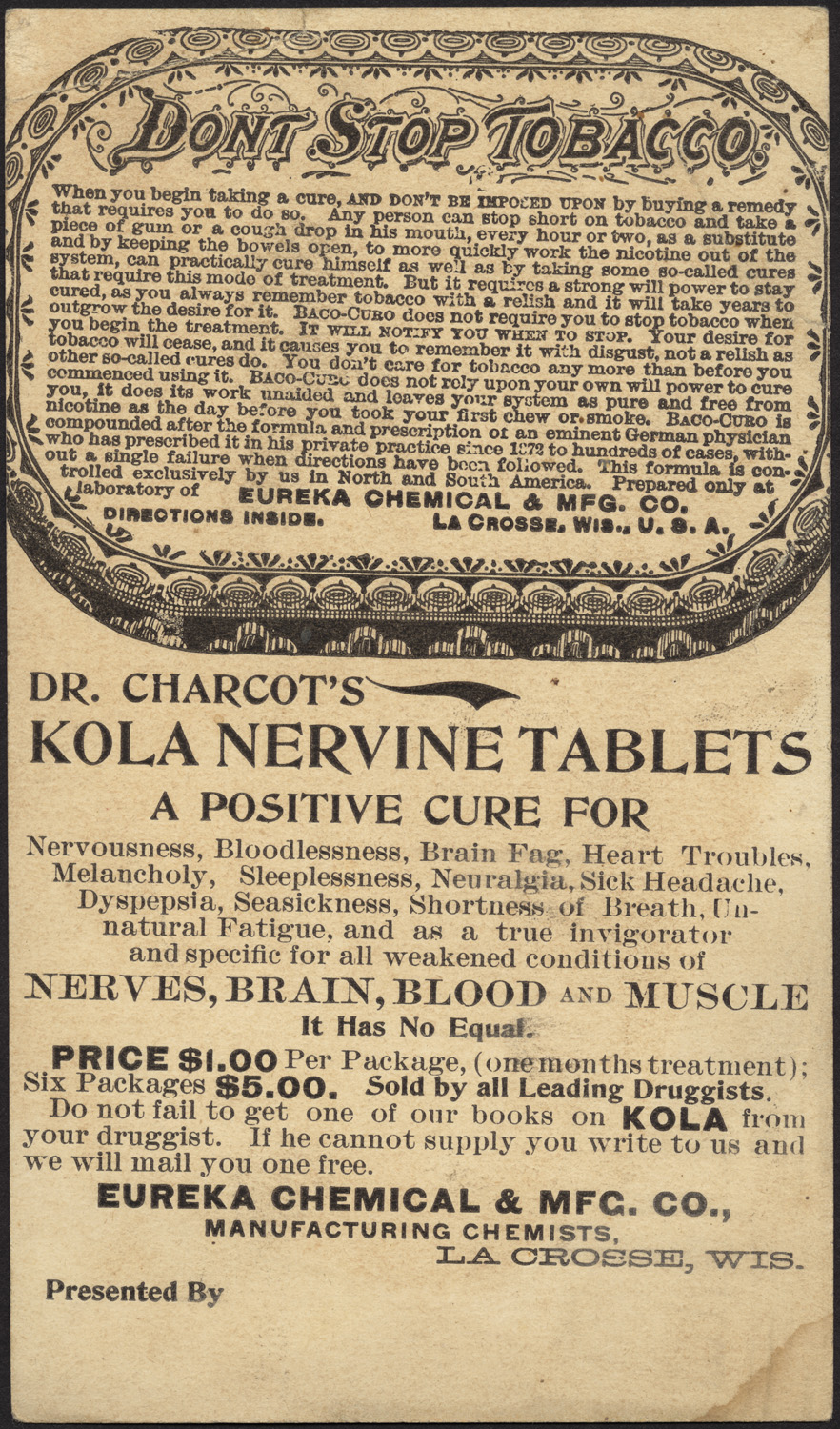
A 19th-century American trade card, listing a cure for "brain fag" among other things

In a 1975 uncontrolled study of 60 male Nigerian students, Anumonye reported treatment success with lorazepam. Others found benefits from antidepressants and relaxation exercises.

== Epidemiology ==
BFS has been reported in other African cultures, and in Brazil, Argentina, and Ethiopian Jews. Historic higher reported prevalence among males may be due to more males being present in higher education in African countries. Studies since the 1990s have not verified gender differences.

Other studies found a possible association with low socioeconomic status, an association with average or higher intelligence, and a high association with neuroticism. Individuals with BFS have been found to have problems with isolation, poor study habits, and the use of psychostimulants as well as physical changes including in muscle tension and heart rate.

== History ==
The condition was first described by R. H. Prince who named the condition based on the term brain fag used by students who believed their symptoms were attributed to "brain fatigue". However, this term was used in Europe dating back to 1839. In a detailed historical account, Ayonrinde (2020) illustrates that contrary to widely held and published belief in diagnostic manuals, psychiatric, social science and educational text, the term "brain fag" and associated syndromes of anxiety, affective and somatoform symptoms in student and "brain worker" populations were first described in nineteenth century Britain (Tunstall, 1850) with dissemination across the British Empire. Ayonrinde concludes that the time has come for the decolonization of brain fag and its African syndromization in the true spirit of ethical scientific rigor in the twenty-first century.

== See also ==
- Burnout
- Exhaustion
