= Ataque de nervios =

Psychological syndrome

Ataque de nervios (Spanish pronunciation: [aˈtake ðe ˈneɾβjos]) (F45.8, R45.0), also known as nervous tension mal de pelea (disease of fighting), "hyperkinetic seizure," and "The Puerto Rican Syndrome" is a psychological syndrome mostly associated in the United States with Spanish-speaking people from the Caribbean, although it is also commonly identified across Iberian-descended cultures. Ataque de nervios translates into English as "attack of nerves". In its cultural context, the term refers to a specific pattern of symptoms, rather than a general feeling of nervousness.

The Diccionario Panhispánico de Términos Médicos translates the term as "attack of nerves" or "nervous breakdown". The condition appears in Appendix I of the revised fourth edition of the Diagnostic and Statistical Manual of Mental Disorders (DSM-IV-TR) as a culture-bound syndrome.

== Classification ==
Despite comparisons to panic attacks, investigators have identified ataque de nervios as a separate syndrome with measured differences in anxiety sensitivity, and types of attacks. Marlene Steinberg, an Associate Research Scientist at Yale University stated that because it is similar to dissociative identity disorder, some Hispanics may be misdiagnosed with an ataque de nervios syndrome instead.

In Steinberg's case study of a 40-year old divorced Hispanic woman, she hypothesizes that the subject's varied presentations of dissociative symptoms throughout her ongoing treatment amounted to a way for her to manage past sexual, emotional, and psychological abuse at the hands of family members. The syndrome is the subject's attempt at challenging the domineering and privileged perceptions of American mainstream culture that was in a way striving for independence from its subjugation of underrepresented groups.

Patricia Gherovici, psychoanalyst in private practice and founding member and director of the Philadelphia Lacan Study Group and Seminar, stated that the classification of the psychological disorder as Puerto Rican is considered derogatory given that individuals under study or afflicted by this condition feel stigmatized and unwillingly made part of a group by this terminology solely based on race, ethnicity, and geographical region. This classification may very well exacerbate the perception of this condition as pathological, rendering individual Puerto Rican individuals unable to bring themselves to rest. The Freudian approach posits that, given the cultural context, this syndrome is a subconscious manifestation of the individual's reliance, for self-identification, on a hypothetical observer that embodies authority and entitlement in society. Gherovici advocated for a cultural perspective in this syndrome's classification that sheds light on how the diverse histories of racial and class oppression manifest themselves.

== Symptoms ==
Reported aspects of the syndrome include uncontrollable screaming or shouting, crying, trembling, sensations of heat rising in the chest and head, dissociative experiences, and verbal or physical aggression. There are also many similarities and differences between the syndrome's pattern of symptoms and those seen in panic disorder. Ataque impersonates features at varying degrees commonly seen in these other psychiatric disorders, such as accelerated heart rate, difficulty breathing, and dizziness. This syndrome is broad and all-embracing in its features of other conditions whereas panic disorder, for instance, is more exclusive in its makeup. As defined in the Diagnostic and Statistical Manual of Mental Disorders (DSM-IV), panic attacks in the context of panic disorder occur frequently and unexpectedly and are not provoked by uncomfortable social situations or traumatic experiences like military combat.

A critical manifestation that ataque and dissociative identity disorder share is that both function as an individual's coping mechanisms against challenging social circumstances. The syndrome is usually associated with a stressful event relating to the family, although it is not specifically defined as arising from such occurrences. It does not involve intense fear. It's critical to emphasize the syndrome's classification as a provoked attack due to its natural occurrence under challenging social circumstances. Study data show that a majority of subjects described their Ataque episodes as provoked by traumatic events along a wide spectrum of levels of severity whether they were isolated occurrences, ongoing experiences, or memories of past disagreeable acts as opposed to unexpected panic attacks which are more indicative of panic disorder. Henceforth, it is more likely that clinicians treat social and personal stressors of Hispanics living in low-income environments rather than exclusively on the bodily factors contributing to the condition. Ataque is an individual's escape route and coping mechanism against these triggers without challenging the social order.

Studies have indicated that the syndrome is not unique to Hispanics and are experienced by Caucasian participants and Black-Americans as well as other cultural groups. The difference in the presentations of its various psychiatric symptoms have also shown to be insignificant in groups not specifically acculturated to Hispanic culture. Even though Ataque is commonly seen in many Hispanic groups, the rate of frequency among other Hispanic, non-Puerto Rican groups, is unknown yet nonetheless vary across cultures.

Being that Ataque is a culturally-bound syndrome, studies have also linked it to spirit possession. Both expressions exhibit similar features, such as wild mood swings, violent outbursts, and identity detachment. In ongoing research, the discussion on whether or not past traumatic events and/or a history of psychiatric symptoms amount to factors contributing to this phenomenon has proven to be contentious. Psychiatrists and medical professionals describe spirit possession as pathological because of its dissociative indicators, which involve an involuntarily deviant disruption of consciousness and altered behaviors that are destabilizing. It can also be described as a purging salve against socio-economic stressors as defined in the DSM-5. Anthropologists interpret spirit possession as a rewarding experience embraced as part of system of religious beliefs commonly seen around the world beyond the dictates of Western medicine. These perspectives are not mutually exclusive, necessarily. Studies involving practitioners of vodou in the Dominican Republic have shown that past trauma and socio-cultural circumstances both prominently forecasts spirit possession and Ataque as well as dissociation and other related psychiatric conditions. Similarly, spirit possession within the framework of unorthodox ritualistic practices can also give agency to disenfranchised groups against those in power.

== History ==
Ataque de nervios was first mentioned after studies were conducted by US medical officers who focused on healthcare for Hispanic populations, particularly soldiers who were Puerto Rican and involved in the Korean War. The symptoms defining this diagnosis resembled hysteria, the form most commonly known for hundreds of years. Given that the psychiatric illness is bound to a particular geographical region, US psychiatrists categorized these symptoms "Puerto Rican syndrome." But, this unique designation transformed an otherwise everyday experience for Puerto Ricans. This problematic classification sheds light on the ethnocentric and stigmatizing nature of medical and health practices of the military complex, showing how US colonial powers exact control over marginalized populations. The military community has had an overwhelming influence on how mental disorders are named and classified in APA Diagnostic and Statistical Manuals (DSM), which demonstrates how its psychiatric practices have impacted the public sector.

== Literary references ==
In Part 3 of Justin Torres' Blackouts, a main character by the name of Juan Gay recounts being diagnosed with "Puerto Rican syndrome." The 2023-nationally acclaimed investigative novel explores queer identity, the violent suppression and institutional violence against the LGBTQ+ community through the relationship between Juan, an old man who is battling illness in a remote dwelling called The Palace and an unnamed narrator--who Juan affectionately refers to by the Spanish nickname "Nene." Both met when they were admitted to a psychiatric hospital 10 years ago. Broken up into 6 parts, the narrative is interspersed with various multimedia elements, including historical photographs, documents, illustrations, as well as redacted excerpts from the 1941 medical book Sex Variants: A Study of Homosexual Patterns with varying degrees of connection to the story.

Part 3 begins with an epigraph, directly quoting from Patricia Gherovici's book of cultural studies and psychoanalysis The Puerto Rican Syndrome. This section is intertwined with excerpts from articles, military medical reports on the condition that provide historical context that also shed light on the personal and social impact of the syndrome. We learn that Juan's condition was common to his family and may have led to him being committed to a psychiatric hospital as an adolescent. Torres' character shares more specific details that address the social stressors that led to his eldest sister's violent tremors, expressing his wish that their parents show him the same quality of attention in caring for their daughter. Both Juan and the unnamed narrator discuss the connection between the Sex Variants study and the psychopathological studies done on the syndrome, entertaining the theory that both were forms of retaliation against the LGBTQ+ community and the growing migration of Puerto Ricans to the US mainland in the 1950s.

== Works ==
- Women on the Verge of a Nervous Breakdown, Spain, 1988
- Blackouts (novel), United States, 2023

== See also ==
- Dissociative identity disorder
- Nervous breakdown
- Susto, Latin America
- Hwabyeong, Korea
- Posttraumatic stress disorder
