= Deer berry =

Deer berry is a common name for several plants and may refer to:

- Gaultheria procumbens
- Maianthemum dilatatum, native to western North America
- Mitchella repens, native to North America
- Vaccinium stamineum, native to North America
