= Ghost sickness =

Cultural belief

Ghost sickness is a culture-bound syndrome among some indigenous peoples in North America and Polynesian peoples in which people are preoccupied with the deceased or consumed by pathological grief. Reported symptoms can include general weakness, loss of appetite, suffocation feelings, recurring nightmares, and a pervasive feeling of terror. The sickness is attributed to ghosts or, occasionally, to witches or witchcraft.

== Cultural background ==
North American people associated with ghost sickness include the Navajo and some Muscogee and Plains cultures. In the Muscogee (Creek) culture, it is believed that everyone is a part of an energy called Ibofanga. This energy supposedly results from the flow between mind, body, and spirit. Illness can result from this flow being disrupted. Therefore, their "medicine is used to prevent or treat an obstruction and restore the peaceful flow of energy within a person". Purification rituals for mourning "focus on preventing unnatural or prolonged emotional and physical drain."

The traditional Native American grief resolution process is qualitatively different from those usually seen in mainstream Western cultures. In 1881, there was a federal ban on some of the traditional mourning rituals practised by the Lakota and other tribes. Lakota expert Maria Yellow Horse Brave Heart proposes that the loss of these rituals may have caused the Lakota to be "further predisposed to the development of pathological grief". Some manifestations of unresolved grief include seeking visions of the spirits of deceased relatives, obsessive reminiscing about the deceased, longing for and believing in a reunion with the deceased, fantasies of reappearance of the deceased, and belief in one's ability to project oneself to the past or to the future.

== Cause ==
There are a variety of mainstream psychological theories about Ghost Sickness. Putsch states that "Spirits or 'ghosts' may be viewed as being directly or indirectly linked to the cause of an event, accident, or illness". Both Erikson and Macgregor report substantiating evidence of psychological trauma response in ghost sickness, with features including withdrawal and psychic numbing, anxiety and hypervigilance, guilt, identification with ancestral pain and death, and chronic sadness and depression.

== Treatment ==
Religious leaders within the Navajo tribe repeatedly perform ceremonies to eliminate the all-consuming thoughts of the dead.

== See also ==
- Complicated grief disorder
- Vengeful ghost
