= Amok syndrome =

Aggressive behavioral pattern

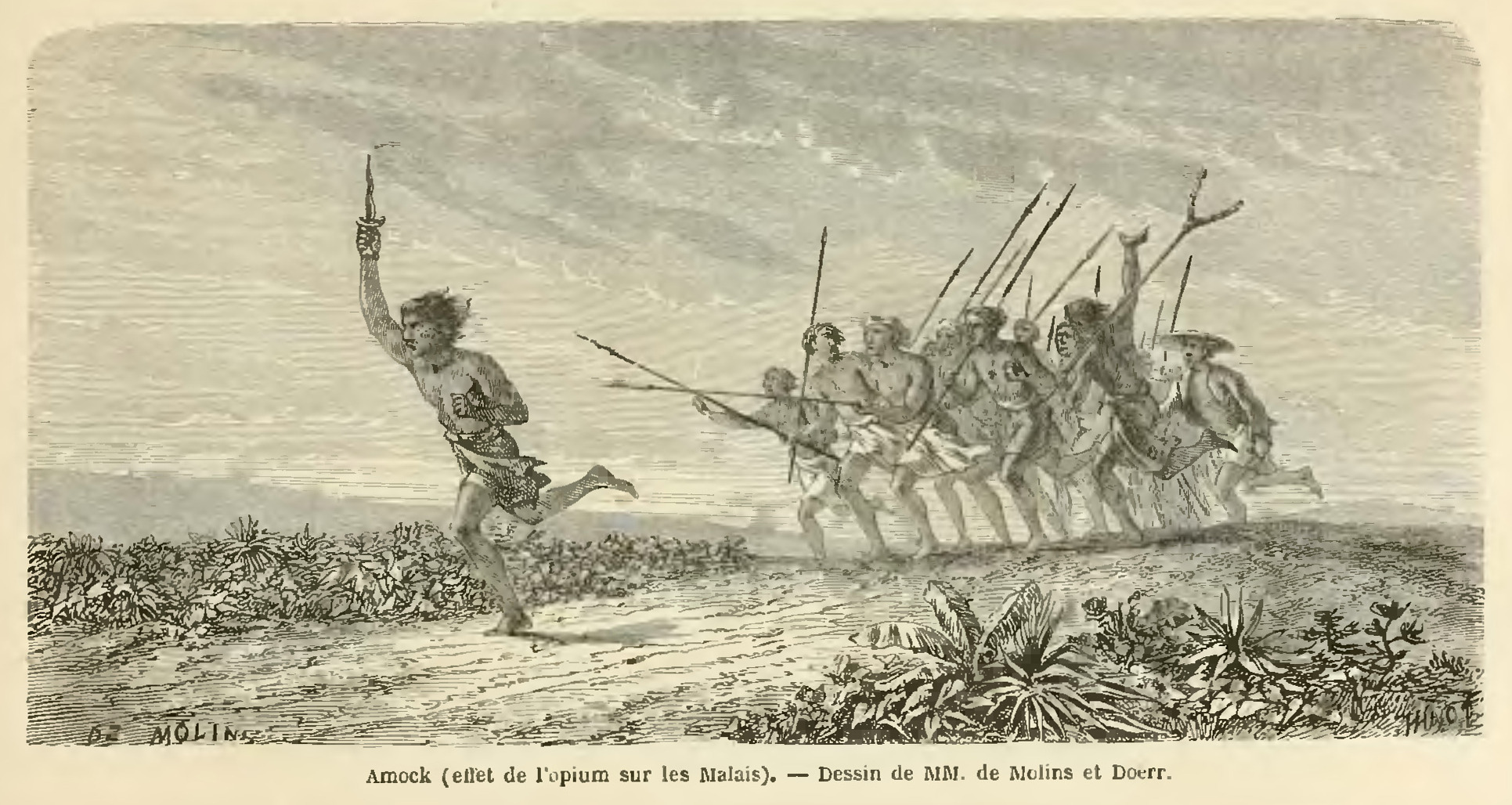
A pengamuk (lit. 'one who runs amok') in Batavia, Java, c. 1858–1861. A group of people pursue to catch or kill him.

Amok syndrome is an aggressive dissociative behavioral pattern derived from the Malay world which led to the English phrase running amok. The word derives from the Malay word amuk, traditionally meaning "rushing in a frenzy" or "attacking furiously". Amok syndrome presents as an episode of sudden mass assault against people or objects following a period of brooding. It has traditionally been regarded as specifically occurring in Malay culture, but is now increasingly viewed as more general psychopathological behavior. The syndrome of "Amok" is found in the Diagnostic and Statistical Manual of Mental Disorders (DSM-IV TR). In the DSM-V, Amok syndrome is no longer considered a culture-bound syndrome, since the category of culture-bound syndrome has been removed.

== Malay word ==
The term amok originated from the Malay word meng-âmuk, which when roughly defined means "to make a furious and desperate charge". In turn, the word was derived from Proto-Malayo-Polynesian word hamuk, "attack". According to Malaysian and Indonesian cultures, amok is rooted in a deep spiritual belief. Malaysians traditionally believe that amok is caused by the hantu belian, which is an evil tiger spirit that enters one's body and causes the heinous act. As a result of this belief, those in Malay culture tolerate amok and deal with the after-effects with no ill will towards the assailant.

Although commonly used in a colloquial and less violent sense, the phrase is particularly associated with a specific culture-bound syndrome in the cultures of Malaysia, Indonesia and Brunei. In a typical case of running amok, an individual, almost always male, having shown no previous sign of anger or any inclination to violence, will acquire a weapon (traditionally a sword or dagger, but possibly any of a variety of weapons) and in a sudden frenzy attempt to kill or seriously injure anyone he encounters and himself.

Amok typically takes place in a well-populated or crowded area. Amok episodes of this kind normally end with the attacker being killed by bystanders or committing suicide, eliciting theories that amok may be a form of intentional suicide in cultures where suicide is heavily stigmatized. Those who do not commit suicide and are not killed typically lose consciousness, and upon regaining consciousness, claim amnesia.

An early Western account of the practice appears in the journals of British explorer Captain James Cook, who purportedly encountered amok firsthand in 1770 during a voyage around the world. Cook writes of individuals behaving in a reckless, violent manner, without apparent cause and "indiscriminately killing and maiming villagers and animals in a frenzied attack."

Amok by women and children is virtually unknown.

== Contemporary psychiatric syndrome ==
In 1849, Amok was officially classified as a psychiatric condition based on numerous reports and case studies that showed the majority of individuals who committed amok were, in some sense, mentally ill. For about twenty years, this type of behavior has been described as a culture-bound syndrome. As of the DSM-V, the culture-bound syndrome category has been removed, meaning that this particular condition is no longer categorized as such. Culture-bound syndromes are seen as those conditions that only occur in certain societies, while standard psychiatric diagnoses are not seen that way, regardless if there is some sort of cultural limitation.

There are similar conditions in other cultures, such as "cafard" in Polynesia or "mal de pelea" in Puerto Rico.

== Forms ==
Though the DSM-IV does not differentiate between them, observers historically described two forms of amok: beramok and amok. Beramok, considered to be more common, was associated with personal loss and preceded by a period of depression and brooding. Amok, the rarer form, was believed to stem from rage, perceived insult or a vendetta against a person.

== Historical and cross-cultural comparisons ==
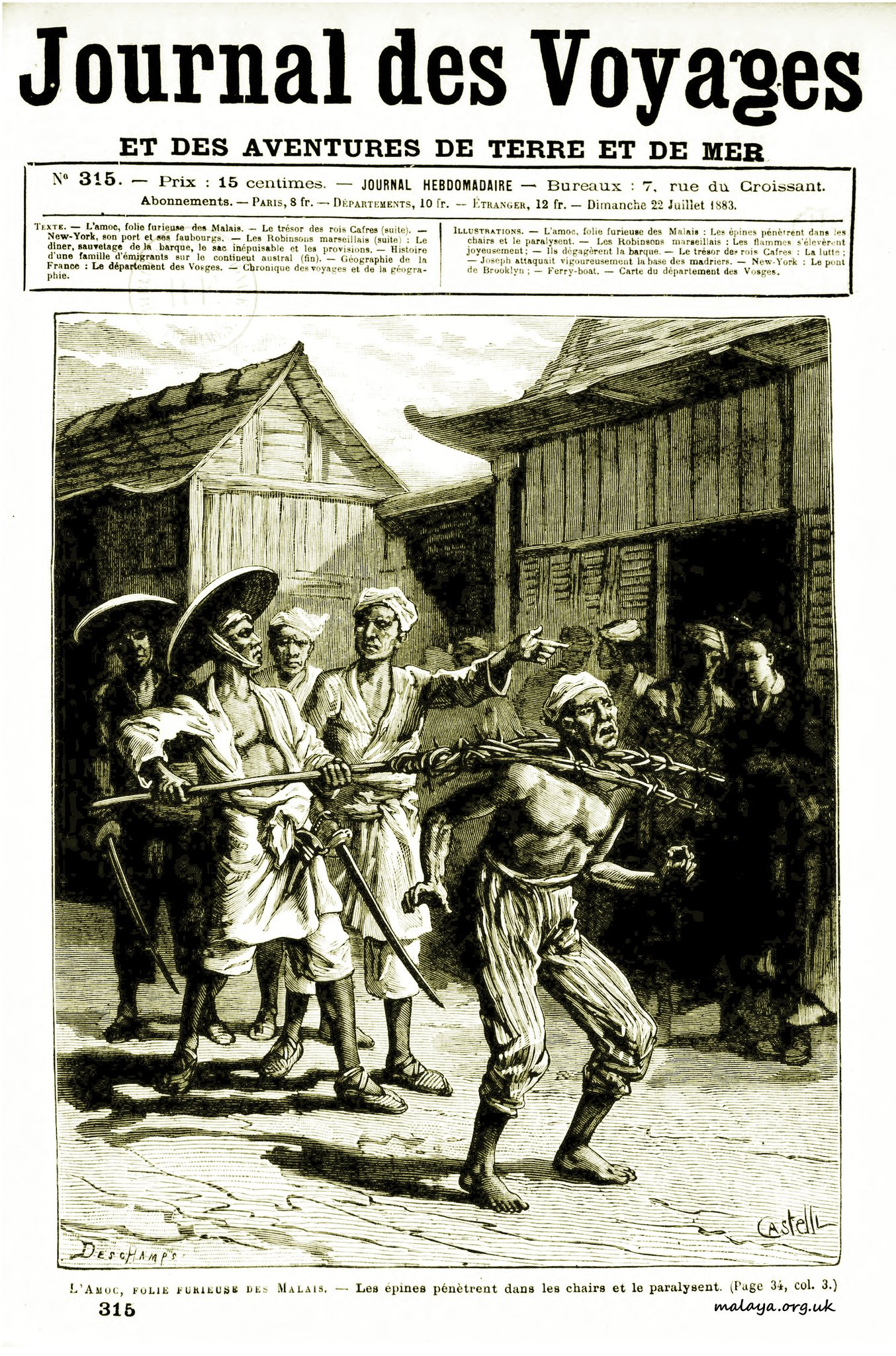
A pengamok being captured, 1883. The thorns on the pole paralyze him.

Early travelers in Asia sometimes described a kind of military amok, in which soldiers apparently facing inevitable defeat suddenly burst into a frenzy of violence which so startled their enemies that it either delivered victory or at least ensured what the soldier in that culture considered an honourable death. A similar case occurred at the Battle of Margarana in 1946 in Bali, where the phenomenon is called puputan, a Balinese term referring to a mass suicide ritual carried out during war rather than surrender to the enemy.

Tomé Pires, in his Suma Oriental, observed the custom of the Javanese people in 1513:

There are among the nations no men who are amocos like those in the Javanese nation. Amocos means men who are determined to die (to run amuck). Some of them do it when they are drunk, and these are the common people; but the noblemen are much in the habit of challenging each other to duels, and they kill each other over their quarrels; and this is the custom of the country. Some of them kill themselves on horseback, and some of them on foot, according to what they have decided.

Duarte Barbosa in 1514 recorded the Javanese people in Malacca:

They have very good arms and fight valiantly. There are some of them who if they fall ill of any severe illness, vow to God that if they remain in health they will of their own accord seek another more honourable death for his service, and as soon as they get well they take a dagger in their hands and go out into the streets and kill as many persons as they meet, both men, women and children, in such wise that they go like mad dogs, killing until they are killed. These are called amuco. And as soon as they see them begin this work, they cry out saying, amuco, amuco, in order that people may take care of themselves, and they kill them with dagger and spear thrusts. Many of these Javans live in this city with wives and children and property.

This form of amok appears to resemble the Scandinavian Berserker, mal de pelea (Puerto Rico), and iich'aa (Navaho). The Zulu battle trance is another example of the tendency of certain groups to work themselves up into a killing frenzy.

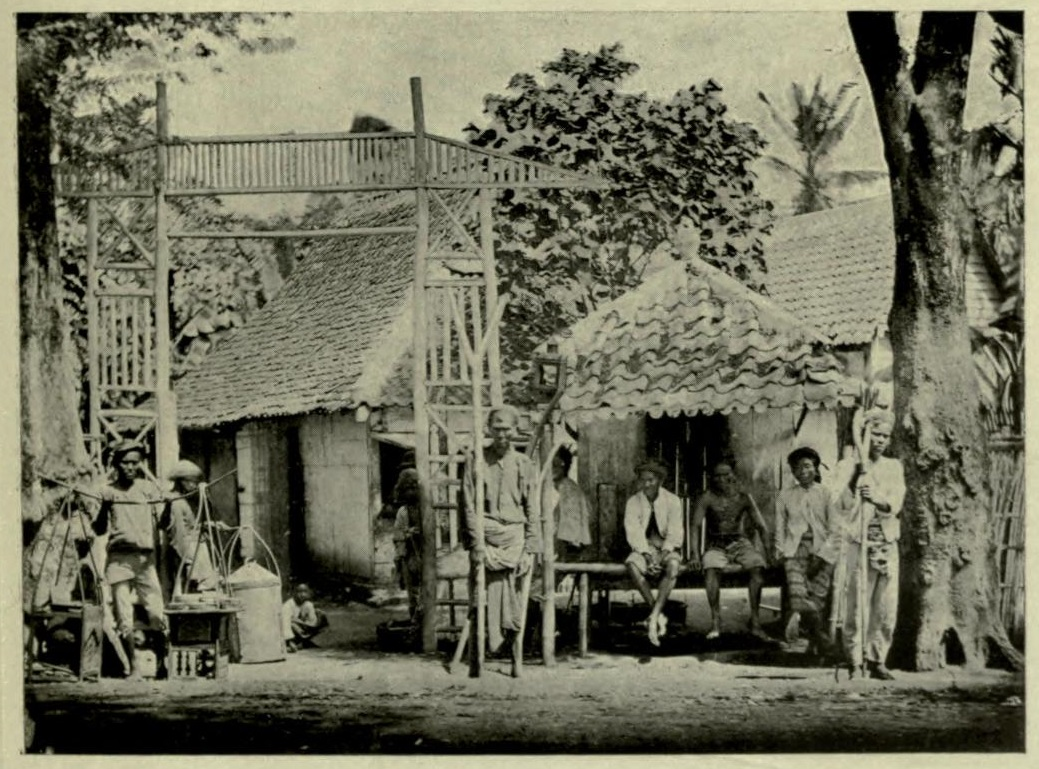
Native policemen in Java, 1911. The man in the centre is holding a sangga mara, a 2-forked pole for catching amok.

In contemporary Indonesia, the term amok (amuk) generally refers not to individual violence, but to frenzied violence by mobs. Indonesians now commonly use the term 'gelap mata' (literally 'darkened eyes') to refer to individual amok. Laurens van der Post experienced the phenomenon in the East Indies and wrote in 1955:

'Gelap mata', the Dark Eye, is an expression used in Sumatra and Java to describe a curious and disturbing social phenomenon. Socially speaking, the Malays, Sumatrans and Javanese are the best behaved people I have ever encountered. On the surface they are an extremely gentle, refined, submissive people. In fact the word 'Malay' comes from 'malu', 'gentle', and gentleness is a quality prized above all others among the Malays and their neighbours. In their family life, in their submission to traditional and parental authority, in their communal duties, they are among the most obedient people on earth. But every now and then something very disturbing happens. A man who has behaved in this obliging manner all his life and who has always done his duty by the outside world to perfection, suddenly finds it impossible to keep doing so. Overnight he revolts against goodness and dutifulness.

In the Philippines, amok also means unreasoning murderous rage by an individual. In 1876, the Spanish governor-general of the Philippines José Malcampo coined the term juramentado for the behavior (from juramentar – "to take an oath"), surviving into modern Philippine languages as huramentado. It has historically been linked with the Moro people of Mindanao, particularly in the Sulu Archipelago, in connection with societal and cultural pressures. A similar term to gelap mata in the Philippines is called pagdilim ng paningin, which translates literally to "darkening of vision". The term is commonly used to refer to a situation where a person is consumed by anger.

According to the Encyclopædia Britannica Eleventh Edition, some notable cases have occurred among the Rajputs. In 1634, the eldest son of the raja of Jodhpur ran amok at the court of Shah Jahan, failing in his attack on the emperor, but killing five of his officials. During the 18th century, again, at Hyderabad (Sind), two envoys, sent by the Jodhpur chief in regard to a quarrel between the two states, stabbed the prince and twenty-six of his suite before they themselves fell.

== In popular culture ==
The Malaysian mythology surrounding hantu belian possessing humans and killing at random is a crucial plot point in The Night Tiger by Yangsze Choo.

In John Brunner's novel Stand on Zanzibar amok became the typical event due to the overpopulation. One of the characters describes the possible mechanism of such behavior.

Indonesia's descent into chaos following the 1965 coup attempt is the background for the third part of Christopher Koch's novel The Year of Living Dangerously, entitled 'Patet Manjura: Amok.'

In music, German band Ledernacken released their first single "Amok!" based on the syndrome in 1983, which peaked at number 29 in US's Billboard Dance Chart in March 1984.

== See also ==
- Berserker
- Active shooter
- Grisi siknis
- Going postal
- Suicide by cop
- List of rampage killers
- Osama bin Laden (elephant)
- Musth (in elephants)
- Psychogenic non-epileptic seizures
- Road rage
- Spree killer
- Tantrum
- "Amok Time"
