= Falling-out =

Loss of consciousness due to psychological stress

Falling-out is a culture-bound syndrome reported in Latin America and the Caribbean and usually brought on by stress.

== Nervous attack (ataque de nervios) or fainting ==
Falling-out is a cultural concept of distress, which is the DSM-5's updated version of culture-bound syndrome. Ataque de nervios is primarily reported in Latin America and the Caribbean. It is described as a constricted consciousness as a psychological response to anxiety and specific stressors.

=== Common symptoms ===
A few symptoms that have been reported are attacks or fits of crying, verbal or physical aggression, uncontrollable shouting, trembling, and the feeling of heat rising throughout the body. Individuals who consistently experience these episodes can feel it coming. It normally consists of feeling lightheaded, dizzy, unsteady when standing, and experiencing changes in vision.

=== Possible causes ===
In most cases, ataques de nervios are directly related to stress and family, such as divorce, death of a loved one, or witnessing/experiencing a traumatic event. The medical term for fainting, or ataques de nervios, is syncope, which happens when the brain does not receive enough oxygen and there is a brief decrease of blood flowing to the brain. Situational syncope occurs when situations affect the nervous system, such as anxiety, fear, pain, dehydration, hyperventilation, and the use of alcohol or drugs. The body falls to the ground when one faints or has a blackout because it makes it easier for oxygenated blood to reach the brain.

=== Possible treatments ===
Ataque de nervios has been treated as a panic or anxiety disorder, and is treated with cognitive behavior therapy. This method of treatment helps the individual identify what is triggering their episodes, which gives them an idea of what they need to avoid. In addition, cognitive behavior therapy will provide individuals with coping mechanisms to use while their episode is occurring. If an individual feels like they are about to faint during their episode, the best preventative approach is to lie down with their legs elevated above their head, or to squat down on their heels.

== See also ==
- Conversion disorder
- Greyout
- Non-epileptic attack disorder
