= Culture-bound syndrome =

Psychiatric and somatic symptoms experienced within a specific culture

In medicine and medical anthropology, a culture-bound syndrome, culture-specific syndrome, or folk illness is a combination of psychiatric and somatic symptoms that are considered to be a recognizable disease only within a specific society or culture. There are no known objective biochemical or structural alterations of body organs or functions, and the disease is not recognized in other cultures. The term culture-bound syndrome was included in the fourth version of the Diagnostic and Statistical Manual of Mental Disorders (American Psychiatric Association, 1994), which also includes a list of the most common culture-bound conditions (DSM-IV: Appendix I). Its counterpart in the framework of ICD-10 (Chapter V) is the culture-specific disorders defined in Annex 2 of the Diagnostic criteria for research.

More broadly, an endemic that can be attributed to certain behavior patterns within a specific culture by suggestion may be referred to as a potential behavioral epidemic. As in the cases of drug use, or alcohol and smoking abuses, transmission can be determined by communal reinforcement and person-to-person interactions. On etiological grounds, it can be difficult to distinguish the causal contribution of culture upon disease from other environmental factors such as toxicity.

== Identification ==
A culture-specific syndrome is characterized by the:

- categorization as a disease in the culture (i.e., not a voluntary behavior or false claim)
- widespread familiarity in the culture
- complete lack of familiarity or misunderstanding of the condition to people in other cultures
- no objectively demonstrable biochemical or tissue abnormalities (signs)
- recognition and treatment by the folk medicine of the culture

Some culture-specific syndromes involve somatic symptoms (pain or disturbed function of a body part), while others are purely behavioral. Some culture-bound syndromes appear with similar features in several cultures, but with locally specific traits, such as penis panics.

A culture-specific syndrome is not the same as a geographically localized disease with specific, identifiable, causal tissue abnormalities, such as kuru or sleeping sickness, or genetic conditions limited to certain populations. It is possible that a condition originally assumed to be a culture-bound behavioral syndrome is found to have a biological cause; from a medical perspective it would then be redefined into another nosological category.

== Medical perspectives ==
The American Psychiatric Association states the following:

The term culture-bound syndrome denotes recurrent, locality-specific patterns of aberrant behavior and troubling experience that may or may not be linked to a particular DSM-IV diagnostic category. Many of these patterns are indigenously considered to be "illnesses," or at least afflictions, and most have local names. Although presentations conforming to the major DSM-IV categories can be found throughout the world, the particular symptoms, course, and social response are very often influenced by local cultural factors. In contrast, culture-bound syndromes are generally limited to specific societies or culture areas and are localized, folk, diagnostic categories that frame coherent meanings for certain repetitive, patterned, and troubling sets of experiences and observations.

The term culture-bound syndrome is controversial since it reflects the different opinions of anthropologists and psychiatrists. Anthropologists have a tendency to emphasize the relativistic and culture-specific dimensions of the syndromes, while physicians tend to emphasize the universal and neuropsychological dimensions. Guarnaccia & Rogler (1999) have argued in favor of investigating culture-bound syndromes on their own terms, and believe that the syndromes have enough cultural integrity to be treated as independent objects of research.

Guarnaccia and Rogler demonstrate the issues that occur when diagnosing cultural bound disorders using the DSM-IV. One of the key problems that arise is the "subsumption of culture bound syndromes into psychiatric categories", which ultimately creates a medical hegemony and places the Western perspective above that of other cultural and epistemological explanations of disease. The urgency for further investigation or reconsideration of the DSM-IV's authoritative power is emphasized, as the DSM becomes an international document for research and medical systems abroad. Guarnaccia and Rogler provide two research questions that must be considered: "firstly, how much do we know about the culture-bound syndromes for us to be able to fit them into standard classification; and secondly, whether such a standard and exhaustive classification in fact exists".

It is suggested that the problematic nature of the DSM becomes evident when viewed as definitively conclusive. Questions are raised to whether culture-bound syndromes can be treated as discrete entities, or whether their symptoms are generalized and perceived as an amalgamation of previously diagnosed illnesses. If this is the case, then the DSM may be what Bruno Latour would define as "particular universalism", in that the Western medical system views itself to have a privileged insight into the true intelligence of nature, in contrast to the model provided by other cultural perspectives.

Some studies suggest that culture-bound syndromes represent an acceptable way within a specific culture (and cultural context) among certain vulnerable individuals (i.e. an ataque de nervios at a funeral in Puerto Rico) to express distress in the wake of a traumatic experience. A similar manifestation of distress when displaced into a North American medical culture may lead to a very different, even adverse outcome for a given individual and the individual's family. The history and etymology of some syndromes such as brain fag syndrome, restricted to West Africa by the DSM-IV, have also been reattributed to 19th century Victorian Britain.

In 2013, the DSM 5 dropped the term culture-bound syndrome, preferring the new name "cultural concepts of distress".

=== Cultural collision between medical perspectives ===
Within the traditional Hmong culture, epilepsy (qaug dab peg) directly translates to "the spirit catches you and you fall down" and is said to be an evil spirit called a dab that captures one's soul and makes one ill. In this culture, individuals with seizures are seen to be blessed with a gift: an access point into the spiritual realm which no one else has been given. In Westernised society, epilepsy is recognized as a serious long-term brain condition that can have a major impairment on an individual's life. The way the illness is dealt with in Hmong culture is vastly different due to the high status epilepsy has in the culture, compared to individuals who have the condition in Westernised societies. Individuals with epilepsy within the Hmong culture are a source of pride for their family.

Another culture-bound illness is neurasthenia, which is a vaguely described medical ailment in Chinese culture that presents as lassitude, weariness, headaches, and irritability and is mostly linked to emotional disturbance. A report done in 1942 showed that 87% of patients diagnosed by Chinese psychiatrists as having neurasthenia could be reclassified as having major depression according to the DSM-3 criteria. Another study conducted in Hong Kong showed that most patients selectively presented their symptoms according to what they perceived as appropriate and tended to focus on only somatic suffering, rather than the emotional problems they were facing.

== Globalisation ==
Globalisation is a process whereby information, cultures, jobs, goods, and services are spread across national borders. This has had a powerful impact on the 21st century in many ways, including enriching cultural awareness across the globe. Greater level of cultural integration is occurring due to rapid industrialisation and globalisation, with cultures absorbing more influences from each other. As cultural awareness begins to increase between countries, there is a consideration into whether cultural-bound syndromes will slowly lose their geographically bound nature and become commonly known syndromes that will then become internationally recognised.

Anthropologist and psychiatrist Roland Littlewood makes the observation that these diseases are likely to vanish in an increasingly homogenous global culture in the face of globalisation and industrialisation. Depression, for example, was once only accepted in Western societies; it is now recognised as a mental disorder in all parts of the world. In contrast to Eastern civilizations such as Taiwan, depression is still much more common in Western cultures like the United States. This could indicate that globalisation may have an impact on allowing disorders to be spread across borders, but these disorders may remain predominant in certain cultures.

== DSM-IV-TR list ==
The fourth edition of Diagnostic and Statistical Manual of Mental Disorders classifies the below syndromes as culture-bound syndromes:

Name	Geographical localization/populations
Running amok	Brunei, Singapore, Malaysia, Indonesia, Philippines, Timor-Leste
Ataque de nervios	Latinos in the United States and Latin America
Bilis, cólera	Latinos in the United States and Latin America
Bouffée délirante	France and French-speaking countries
Brain fag syndrome	West African students
Dhat syndrome	India
Falling-out, blacking out	Southern United States and Caribbean
Ghost sickness	Native American (Navajo, Muscogee/Creek)
Hwabyeong	Korean
Koro	Chinese, Malaysian, and Indonesian populations in Southeast Asia; Assam; occasionally in the West
Latah	Malaysia and Indonesia, as well as the Philippines (as mali-mali, particularly among Tagalogs)
Locura	Latinos in the United States and Latin America
Mal de pelea	Puerto Rico
Piblokto	Arctic and subarctic Inuit populations
Zou huo ru mo (Qigong psychotic reaction)	Han Chinese
Sangue dormido	Cape Verde
Shenjing shuairuo	Han Chinese
Shenkui, shen-k'uei	Han Chinese
Shinbyeong	Koreans
Spell (trance)	African American, White populations in the Southern United States and Ethiopia
Susto	Latinos in the United States; Mexico, Central America, and South America
Taijin kyofusho	Japanese

== DSM-5 list ==
The fifth edition of Diagnostic and Statistical Manual of Mental Disorders classifies the below syndromes as cultural concepts of distress, a closely related concept:

Name	Geographical localization/populations
Ataque de nervios	Latin America
Dhat syndrome	India
Khyâl cap	Cambodian
Ghost sickness	Native American
Kufungisisa	Zimbabwe
Maladi moun	Haiti
Shenjing shuairuo	Han Chinese
Susto	Latinos in the United States; Mexico, Central and South America
Taijin kyofusho	Japanese

== ICD-10 list ==
The 10th revision of the International Statistical Classification of Diseases and Related Health Problems (ICD) classifies the below syndromes as culture-specific disorders:

Name	Geographical localization/populations
Amok	Southeast Asian Austronesians
Ataque de nervios	Mexico, Central and South America
Dhat syndrome (dhātu), shen-k'uei, jiryan	India; Taiwan
Koro, suk yeong, jinjin bemar	Southeast Asia, India, China
Latah	Malaysia and Indonesia
Pa-leng (frigophobia)	Taiwan; Southeast Asia
Pibloktoq (Arctic hysteria)	Inuit living within the Arctic Circle
Susto, espanto	Mexico, Central and South America
Taijin kyofusho, shinkeishitsu (anthropophobia)	Japan
Ufufuyane, saka	Kenya; southern Africa (among Bantu, Zulu, and affiliated groups)
Uqamairineq	Inuit living within the Arctic Circle
Fear of Wendigo	Indigenous people of north-east America

== Other examples ==
Though "the ethnocentric bias of Euro-American psychiatrists has led to the idea that culture-bound syndromes are confined to non-Western cultures", within the contiguous United States, the consumption of kaolin, a type of clay, has been proposed as a culture-bound syndrome observed in African Americans in the rural South, particularly in areas in which the mining of kaolin is common.

In South Africa, among the Xhosa people, the syndrome of amafufunyana is commonly used to describe those believed to be possessed by demons or other malevolent spirits. Traditional healers in the culture usually perform exorcisms in order to drive off these spirits. Upon investigating the phenomenon, researchers found that many of the people claimed to be affected by the syndrome exhibited the traits and characteristics of schizophrenia.

Some researchers have suggested that both premenstrual syndrome (PMS) and the more severe premenstrual dysphoric disorder (PMDD), which have currently unknown physical mechanisms, are Western culture-bound syndromes. However, this is controversial.

Tarantism is an expression of mass psychogenic illness documented in Southern Italy since the 11th century.

Morgellons is a rare self-diagnosed skin condition that has been described as "a socially transmitted disease over the Internet".

Vegetative-vascular dystonia can be considered an example of a somatic condition formally recognised by local medical communities in former Soviet Union countries, but not in Western classification systems. Its umbrella term nature as a neurological condition also results in diagnosing neurotic patients as neurological ones, in effect substituting possible psychiatric stigma with culture-bound syndrome disguised as a neurological condition.

Refugee children in Sweden have been known to fall into coma-like states on learning their families will be deported. The condition, known in Swedish as uppgivenhetssyndrom, or resignation syndrome, is believed to only exist among the refugee population in Sweden, where it has been prevalent since the early part of the 21st century. In a 130-page report on the condition commissioned by the government and published in 2006, a team of psychologists, political scientists, and sociologists hypothesized that it was a culture-bound syndrome.

A startle disorder similar to latah, called imu (sometimes spelled imu:), is found among Ainu people, both Sakhalin Ainu and Hokkaido Ainu.

A condition similar to piblokto, called menerik (sometimes meryachenie), is found among Yakuts, Yukaghirs, and Evenks living in Siberia.

The trance-like violent behavior of the Viking age berserkers – behavior that disappeared with the arrival of Christianity – has been described as a culture-bound syndrome.

== See also ==
- Cross-cultural psychiatry
- Cross-cultural psychology
- Cultural competence in healthcare
- Dancing mania
- Mass psychogenic illness
- Hikikomori
- Hi-wa itck
- Medical anthropology
- Neurasthenia
- Zen sickness
- Bold hives
