= Straight women's preference for lesbian pornography =

Psychological phenomenon

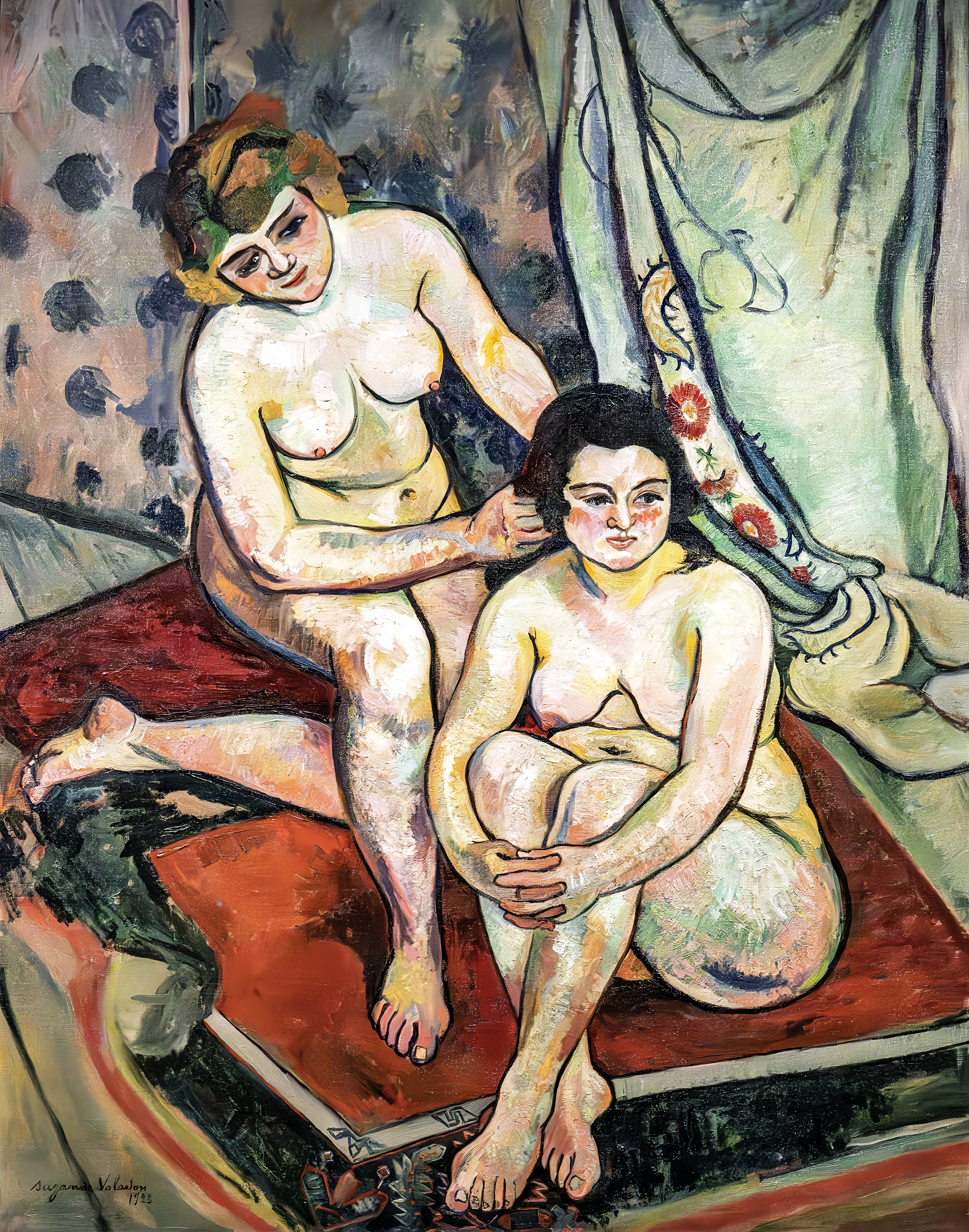
Les baigneuses (The bathers) by Suzanne Valadon (1923)

Straight women's preference for lesbian pornography is a widely documented phenomenon in which self-identified heterosexual women prefer lesbian pornography over male-on-female or even male-on-male pornography due to a greater emphasis on female pleasure.

Annually since 2013, Pornhub Insights has released a "Year In Review" report (except in 2020 due to the COVID-19 pandemic). The data found that the lesbian category has been consistently the most popular among female viewers since 2014 when gender statistics were first gathered, and that women in general regardless of sexual orientation are more likely to search for lesbian-associated terms such as "scissoring" than men, who are typically the target audience of such content. Several articles; including those by Cosmopolitan, Glamour, and Women's Health magazines; have supported these findings through research of their own.

A 2016 Pornhub insights noted that women in Canada and the United States are 186% more likely to search for lesbian videos compared to men.

== Biology ==
Canadian sexologist Meredith Chivers found that straight women show more flexible arousal patterns than straight men, including responses to both male and female sexual stimuli. Some studies also report that a substantial share of heterosexual women admit to some same-sex attraction or fantasy, even if they still identify as straight.

American social psychologist Roy Baumeister coined the term "erotic plasticity", which is the extent to which one's sex drive can be shaped by socio-cultural factors. He argues that women have high plasticity, meaning that their sex drive can more easily change in response to external pressures. On the other hand, men have low plasticity, and therefore have sex drives that are relatively inflexible.
