= Sexual desire and intimate relationships =

Human sexuality

Definitions of sexual desire are broad and understandings of sexual desire are subjective. However, the development of various ways of measuring the construct allows for extensive research to be conducted that facilitates the investigation of influences of sexual desire. Particular differences have been observed between the sexes in terms of understanding sexual desire both with regard to one's own sexual desires, as well as what others desire sexually. These beliefs and understandings all contribute to how people behave and interact with others, particularly in terms of various types of intimate relationships.

== Understanding sexual desire ==
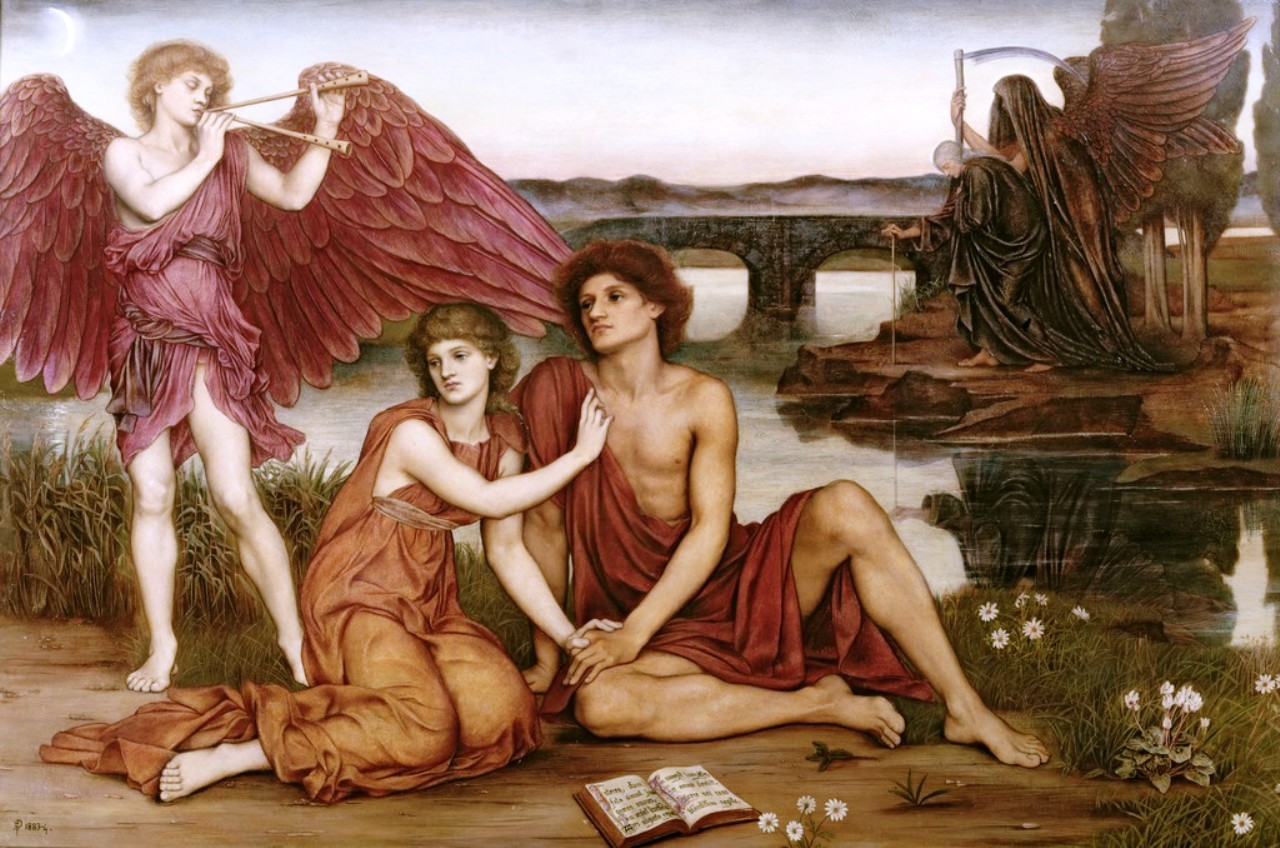
Love's Passing by Evelyn Pickering

As there is no single understanding of sexual desire, it is important to explore beliefs about the nature of the construct to reveal the different ways that it is characterized.

=== Clinical conceptualizations ===
Theorists believe that sexual desire can serve a number of roles, as a combination of both desire for physical pleasure as well as a need for intimacy in terms of love and affection though the weight of each need may vary dependent on situational context and the individuals involved. Researchers also consistently define sexual desire in the context of motivations, cognitions, emotions and similarly subjective psychological experiences that may be described as the need, wish, longing for, or drive to seek out sexual engagement as opposed to the physiological arousal or sexual events.

One definition of sexual desire specifically characterizes the construct as "the sum of the forces that lean us toward and away from sexual behaviour". An ordinary spectrum of sexual desire as one that may range from aversion to passion, and though individuals may experience fairly consistent patterns of sexual desire throughout their lives, patterns of sexual desire do evolve over the course of a lifetime, as it is subject to such influences as age, gender, social situation, and health.

==== Measures ====
Sexual desire may not be as directly or reliably testable as sexual arousal, which can be validly and reliably assessed by monitoring genital and other physiological arousal. No test exists that can definitely measure sexual desire. Through the use of functional magnetic resonance imaging (fMRI) brain imaging techniques, hormonal assessment and self-report questionnaires such as the Passionate Love Scale (PLS) various cognitive and behavioural characteristics have been found to reliably identify sexual desire across cultures and distinguish it from other feelings of love and attachment.

=== Male and female conceptualizations and differences ===
"Most researchers would label the sex drive difference as 'moderate to large'. Looked at another way, our results mean that about three-quarters of men will have a somewhat stronger sex drive than the average sex drive among women. But our data also indicate that when a woman with an unknown sex drive walks down the street, her sex drive will on average exceed that of every third man she encounters. Thus, although a gender difference is clearly observable, there is still much variation between men and women" (Friese, Malte. 2023).

==== States, goals and objects ====
In a study conducted by Regan & Bersched (1996), when asked to freely define sexual desire, 90% of both male and female participants defined the phenomenon consistently with theorists' definitions of sexual desire; however, despite the tendency for men and women to describe desire in similar ways to clinical definitions in terms of motivation, men and women have been found to characterize the goals of sexual desire differently. Whereas women tend to consider love and emotional intimacy as high ranking goals of sexual desire, men are more likely to consider sexual activity as the primary goal of sexual desire.

It has also been suggested that women are more likely than men to develop a "relational" or "person-centered" orientation to sexual desire, whereas men are more likely to adopt a "recreational" or "body-centered" orientation to sexuality. These results further support the suggestion that despite generally consistent definitions of sexual desire, perceived differing end goals of sexual desire may exist between the sexes.

==== Beliefs ====
In keeping with providing definitions of sexual desire consistent with those of theorists, both men and women have consistently expressed their beliefs that the causes of male sexual desire differ from female causes of sexual desire. Both are in general agreement about the nature of these causes, but when other-sex attracted men and women have been asked to describe what they believe the opposite sex finds attractive, both internalize and believe that the opposite sex values the stereotypical male or female qualities associated with their own sex. However, neither sex consistently confirms that they are attracted to the stereotypically sexually desirable traits of the opposite sex.

These findings of men and women's beliefs regarding what traits the opposite sex finds sexually desirable, as well as perceived differences pertaining to how each sex conceptualizes sexual desire are important to consider, particularly within the context of nurturing sexual desire.

== Sexual desire and love ==
It is believed by many that sexual desire plays an important role in romantic love and that it may be an extremely important factor in strengthening the interpersonal dynamic of romantic relationships; recent studies have supported these theories and have also provided further insight into the various neurobiological substrates that influence the development of various types of relationships.

=== Different types of love ===
Over the course of history and across cultures, a number of different types of love have been described. For example, Sternberg's triangular theory of love illustrates various types of possible loves, outlining the dynamics between passion, intimacy and commitment in the development of romantic love, infatuation, companionate love, liking, fatuous love, empty love, and consummate love . However, here we will look specifically at two of the most popularly discussed types of love: passionate love and companionate love.

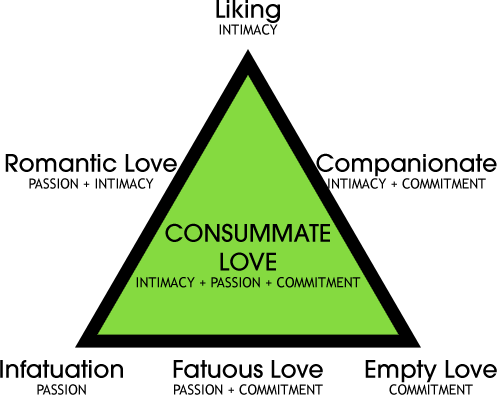
Sternberg's triangular theory of love

==== Passionate love ====
Passionate love is a state of attraction and increased preoccupation with a specific person and may be described as obsessive love or infatuation. Passionate love is defined as "a state of intense longing for union with another", and may also be commonly described as being in-love. This intense feeling is characterized by the experience of great emotional highs and lows, and when it is reciprocated through union with the beloved, it can lead to feelings of euphoria, exhilaration, fulfillment and ecstasy; however, if passionate love is unrequited and union is not achieved, the absence may lead to feelings of emptiness, anxiety and despair.

Although passionate love is generally accompanied by intense desires and strong urges for emotional and physical closeness, resistance to separation and highs when attention is granted by the individual of interest, passionate love is often described as a temporary state. It is not uncommon for passionate love to turn into companionate love.

==== Companionate love ====
Companionate love is a much less intense form of love, where desire for proximity and resistance to separation become less urgent. This form of love is influenced by feelings of attachment, commitment and intimacy, but is much less anxious than passionate love, and typically nurtures feelings of security, care, comfort and emotional union.

== Sexual desire in romantic relationships ==
As a state that promotes passion and infatuation, sexual desire is often responsible in playing a role in initiating contact, motivating sexual interest, and seeking proximity. By motivating proximity seeking behaviour, sexual desire promotes contact, and this may eventually foster commitment. This is one explanation for why sexual desire tends to be so strong at the beginning of relationships and may account for why its presence or absence can reflect the strength of commitment between partners. However, research has also shown that romantic relationships can exist in the absence of sexual desire, even during the beginning stages where they may be at their most romantically passionate. Men and women have also expressed the belief that when dating, if partners experience sexual desire for each other, there is a greater likelihood for positive outcomes to emerge in terms of interpersonal closeness as well as a reduced likelihood to experience negative events in the relationship, regardless of the frequency of sexual activity.

As will be discussed in greater detail in the following section in Components of Sexual Desire and Love, it has in fact been found that passionate love actually leads to the suppression of certain parts of the brain that are responsible for critical thought, making it less likely that individuals will criticize or think negatively about the character or personality of individuals they are in love with.

When partners describe their relationship as one where they are romantically in love, individuals are more likely to experience sexual desire for their partners than those men and women who only love or like one another; in such situations where the relationship has been described as liking or loving, the likelihood of sexual desire has been shown to be equally as unlikely. If couples experience mismatched patterns of sexual desire, however, the partner who experiences high-desire is more likely to report feelings of love, satisfaction, commitment, happiness and jealousy, while the less sexually interested partner is more likely to report dissatisfaction, and may be more likely to terminate the relationship or be unfaithful. Sexual desire in the absence of love has also been suggested as largely motivating the pursuit of short-term mating strategies rather than initiating long-term commitments, with love however, sexual desire correlated with increased sexual satisfaction.

== Components of love and sexual desire ==
Overall, the covariation of love and desire is suggested as support for the theory that each may influence the other in certain contexts.

=== Love, sexual desire and attachment ===
Neurobiological substrates responsible for sexual desire (libido) and romantic love are distinct, as are those responsible for attachment. Though sexual desire and romantic love may be experienced together, the presence of one is not sufficient to predict the presence of the other. Different kinds of love may consist of various combinations of these 3 components, and may consequently be experienced separately.

Love, sexual desire and attachment are each described as separate constructs, and each is aptly associated with particular behaviours, hormonal influences and brain regions. As this page asserts, romantic love is characterized by its ups and downs, where experiences range from the ecstatic experiences of reciprocated love to the anxiety associated with unrequited love; various neurobiological substrates are responsible for producing these feelings, and as such, chemical patterns responsible for this range of emotion vary accordingly.

==== Love ====
Described as "a longing for union", love is a state that is strongly associated with behaviours that are approach-related, linked to happiness, and self-reports of love correlate to affiliation cues such as smiles and gesticulation. In keeping with an association to happiness, love is associated with the stimulants dopamine, norepinephrine and serotonin.

Research has shown that parts of the brain activated when viewing pictures of partners of individuals with whom they are in love, as compared to pictures of friends, are the same areas that have been associated in previous studies with positive emotions, opioid-induced euphoria, attention to both the emotional states of partners as well as one's own personal emotional states. Heightened activation was found in the middle insula and the anterior cingulate cortex, as well as deactivation of the posterior cingulate gyrus, the amygdala, and the right prefrontal, parietal, and middle temporal cortices. The areas deactivated in the viewing of loved ones are those associated with sadness, fear, aggression and depression. Notably, these areas affected by exposure to loved ones did not overlap with brain regions typically activated during arousal, further emphasizing that distinct neural-systems exist for emotion-motivating systems of lust and romantic love.

Heightened activity has also been found in the right ventral tegmental area and right caudate nucleus, dopamine-rich areas associated with mammalian reward and motivation. It is suggested that the activation of dopaminergic pathways are what contribute to the arousal component of romantic love.

==== Sexual desire ====
Sexual desire has been described as a "longing for sexual union", it associates with certain behaviours that are more linked to arousal and states of fear, concern and enhanced attention to others, and sexual cue displays such as lip biting and touching. In keeping with the correlation between sexual desire and arousal, sexual desire is mediated by gonadal estrogens and androgens.

Enhanced focus, concern and attention toward the desired other has not only been associated with increased arousal by means of testosterone, but also with elevated concentrations of central dopamine and norepinephrine, and decreased levels of central serotonin. Other forms of physiological arousal associated with enhanced levels of dopamine include increased energy, exhilaration, euphoria, sleeplessness, loss of appetite, trembling, pounding heartbeat, and accelerated breathing. This same increased arousal is also a feature of attraction, and is the suggested cause of feelings of exhilaration, ecstasy, intrusive thinking about the love object, regarding them as unique and a craving for emotional union with this partner or potential partner. Feelings of anxiety, panic and fear in the presence of a beloved may also occur, as well as susceptibility to abrupt mood swings. If a relationship should suffer negatively, this may cause the attracted individual to fall into feelings of despair and brooding, which could translate to behaviours and situations outside of the relationship.

When sexual desire is experienced in the context of a passionate romantic relationship, the brain is also affected such that chemical changes lead to the activation and shut down of various areas. Using fMRI brain imaging techniques to monitor the neural activity of participants who scored high on self-reports of passionate love on the Passionate Love Scale (PSL), passionate love was associated with parts of the brain associated with critical thought. The increased attention on one's beloved accompanied by this decrease in critical thought may reduce negative criticism or evaluations of the individual towards whom sexual desire is directed, however this also may result in false appraisals of the individuals by overseeing one's potentially negative traits.

Since sexual desire increases attraction to the object of one's desire, this motivates prolonged closeness with the other individual. By extension, proximity increases the likelihood of stronger affectional bonds to form between sexual partners as opposed to platonic friends; however, due to the functional independence of sexual desire and love, humans may mate without bonding or may bond without mating. Affectional bonds are generally a product of high levels of proximity and physical contact with individuals over time. Sufficient time spent together, and forms of touch allow for the development of this pair-bonding, and though sexual desire may promote closeness, alone it does not characterize romantic love. Affectional bonds are characterized by feelings of infatuation and emotional attachment.

==== Attachment ====
Studies that have assessed various forms of attachment in both animals and humans have found that oxytocin and vasopressin are responsible for attachment. It has not only been suggested that oxytocin is responsible for increased pair-bonding between individuals who are generally in close proximity and contact, but it may also be associated with the desire to affiliate, as previously mentioned with love and happiness.

Much like the opioids mentioned above, the neuropeptide oxytocin has been shown to be extremely affective in the conditioning effects involved in the formation of stable preferences for places, stimuli and other beings. Studies have shown that women specifically not only show greater sensitivity to the release of oxytocin during sexual activity than men, but it has been suggested a correlation exists between oxytocin release and orgasm intensity, which may explain why women generally associate stronger interconnectivity between love and sexual desire.

Extensive research suggests that specific feelings, behaviours and cognitions are associated with the development of affiliative bonds and that these underlying processes responsible for sexual desire and affiliative bonds are functionally independent. Endogenous opioids, catecholamines, and neuropeptides (such as oxytocin and vasopressin) are responsible for the reward circuitry of the mammalian brain; through conditioned associations and reinforcement these neurochemicals regulate the biological processes that facilitate bonding.

== Evolutionary perspectives ==
=== Attraction ===
Responsible for focused attention on finding a preferred sexual partner, the attraction system increases energy and focuses attention on desired individuals. Evolutionary theories suggest that the human dopaminergic reward system may also serve a primarily reproductive purpose, whereby it works in concert with the corticostriate system that combines the reward signals associated with attraction with cortical information, to regulate the complex relationship between romantic love and mate choice. This is thought to preserve energy and facilitate mate choice by enabling individuals to focus their mating energy on specific individuals. This biobehavioural system also resembles other mechanisms of mammalian attraction. Attraction specifically facilitates the choosing of specific mating partners to conserve mating time and energy.

=== Affectional bonding ===
Evolutionary theories suggest that reproductive mating is responsible for sexual desire while pair bonding underlies the mechanisms of romantic love. Specifically, attachment is suggested as extremely influential for the development of romantic love, which begins with infant-caregiver attachment and translates, in adulthood, to the development of romantic relationships.

Individuals are likely to fall in love with partners to whom they are sexually attracted, and this is evolutionarily adaptive as this facilitates pair-bonding between sexual partners and ensures that offspring have two dedicated parents. Though evolutionary theory suggests that the biobehavioural mechanisms responsible for affectional bonding may have evolved as a means to assist in reproductive mating, this may not be true.

Bowlby's theory concerning infant-caregiver attachment suggests that the biobehavioural systems responsible for attachment and affectional bonding evolved as a means to ensure that infants are kept in close proximity to their caregivers to maximize their chances of survival. When children become attached to caregivers this creates an intense affectional bond, whereby being in close to the caregiver provides the child with feelings of comfort and security, whereas separation creates feelings of distress and anxiety. Though the development of this form of attachment appears early in life, these patterns of security and anxious longing have been shown to be reflected in passionate relationships later in life.

Strong behavioural and neurobiological evidence support the connection between infant-caregiver attachment and adult pair bonding, whereby the same core emotions and behaviours are exhibited. Both forms of attachment in infancy and adulthood are centered on a desire for increased proximity, resistance to separation and use of partner as their preferred source of comfort and security. Chemically, both types of affectional bonding reveal the same opioid and oxytocin based neural circuitry. This connection between separation and anxiety across the animal kingdom suggests a hard-wired desire for union.

=== Present day implications ===
Some studies that outline the underlying processes of love and attachment as well as the motivational factors for reproduction and pair-bonding, have argued the transient nature of passionate love. Evolutionary theorists suggest that passionate love and sexual desire have played important practical and genetic roles for various animal species. Helen Fisher, who has conducted extensive research on the biobehavioural mechanisms responsible for mate-choice and reproduction, suggests that historically, our ancestors were primed to fall passionately in love for about four years. She proposes that this is about the time it takes to conceive and raise a child to the point where their survival is most secure, and that after this time passionate love would no longer be necessary to secure the pair bond between the parents so as ensure the health and survival of their offspring. Fisher proposes this explanation for why love is fleeting, and for why throughout the world and cross-culturally, couples most commonly divorce after their fourth year of marriage. She suggests that serial monogamy is the best way to ensure genetic variation, and that the combination of these factors may be useful explanations for the modern cultural patterns of marriage, divorce and remarriage.

== Models of sexual desire ==
As previously discussed, though distinct from one another, sexual desire and romantic love are often experienced together, and various theories propose explanations for why this may be, generally within the context of promoting reproduction and pair-bonding. Consequently, this reasoning is problematic for interpreting the differences in sexual responses and sexual dysfunction between genders, and presents problems in identifying low or nonexistent sexual desire.

=== Basson's circular response model ===
Though the traditional model of sexual desire as proposed by Masters and Johnson and Kaplan suggests that the same model can be used to understand sexual responses for both men and women, Basson's recent model of circular response has been developed to account for findings that women do not experience sexual desire as a drive at the initial outset of sexual activity as is more typical of men.

The traditional model begins with sexual desire, which leads to arousal, orgasm and resolution; however, the circular response cycle does not rely on the initial presence of sexual desire, but rather on the idea that various sexual and nonsexual outcomes influence sexual motivation and may trigger sexual desire during the experience.

Female arousal is complex, as evidenced by the findings that women's reported feelings of sexual arousal have not been found to correlate with physiological genital arousal, and that for many women there is no reported distinction between their experiences of sexual desire and arousal.

==== Responsive desire and spontaneous desire ====
The model of circular response reveals the complexity of female sexual desire, and relies on responsive desire. Responsive desire refers to a woman's motivation and ability to find and respond to sexual stimuli to experience sexual arousal and future sexual desire is complex and interconnected. Responsiveness in women has been shown to be strongly influenced by "her emotional intimacy with her partner and her desire to enhance it".

Female sexual desire is more dependent on subjective sexual excitement toward particular stimuli as opposed to an association with objective vasocongestion. Spontaneous desire refers to "spontaneous sexual wanting", and is characterized by the need to experience sexual arousal through partnered sex, self-stimulation or fantasy, in order to experience pleasure and experience the benefits generated by the stimulation. Androgens, dopamine, oxytocin and centrally acting noradrenaline all influence spontaneous desire by motivating the pursuit of sexual stimuli and promoting increased arousability.

Though the traditional model of sexual response was founded on the belief that sexual thoughts and fantasies are normally sufficient to initiate arousal, which should then lead to orgasm and end in a resolution phase, "sexual hunger" in the form of initial arousal is not the sole reason women report for being sexual. A lack of spontaneous desire is not necessarily indicative of sexual dysfunction. Women often express a desire to engage in sexual intimacy as a means to get closer to their partners, to increase emotional closeness, commitment, tenderness, tolerance and to express their appreciation for their partner both physically and/or emotionally. Women are more likely to experience spontaneous desire early in relationships, midcycle, after a partner has been absent emotionally or physically, however, women may also follow no particular pattern in their experiences of spontaneous sexual desire.

According to the circular response model of sexual desire, the arousal is not spontaneous, but must be triggered by specific sexual stimuli. Once the individual is aroused, intimacy motivations work in concert with this achieved arousal to promote the development of yet further sexual arousal. Previously undesirable sexual stimuli, specifically to breasts and genitalia, may be welcome and enjoyed once the development of sexual desire is fostered.

The circular response model clarifies that when sexual desire is responsive there are many points of vulnerability and that the presence of sexual stimuli is not always enough to guarantee arousal or increased desire. It also emphasizes that, when the motivating force of sexual desire is emotional intimacy, negative psychological consequences can result, due to the complexity and precariousness of the driving force behind the desire.

There is still much that is unknown about the underlying systems responsible for female sexual functioning. As evidenced by the poor correlation between physiological arousal and reported subjective sexual excitement, drugs that seek to treat female sexual dysfunction by increasing genital blood flow need to be conducted in the context of psychophysiologic studies which consider the combined influences of both psychological and physiological factors that contribute to the biological basis of women's sexual responsivity.

== Influences on sexual desire ==
=== Influences ===
Some differences in sexual desire may emerge as a result of factors such as age, health, and various other biological influences. However, other situational factors associated with past or current negative cognitions, mental illness, or previous negative experiences, may also affect patterns of sexual responsiveness. For example, though a great emphasis is often placed on menopause as a leading cause of decreased sexual desire in middle-aged women, other life stressors have been shown to be even more significant predictors of women's sexual interests.

A particularly interesting contribution to the influence of sexual desire in intimate relationships is the potential role of socialization in the reinforcement of gender-specific behaviours that may force women to restrict their expression or enjoyment of sexual feelings, and influence the development of intimate relationships. For example, where men are often expected to enjoy more sexual freedom, women are encouraged to be more sexually restricted.

==== Nurturing sexual desire ====
Discussions regarding the development of sexual identities as reinforced through environmental factors emphasize the impacts of socialization through media and other forms of educations. Early debates around the development of confident females and the promotion of healthy sexual desire suggested such interventions as "sexuality education" to foster the full development of the sexual self through education and more open discourse. Current emphasis on promoting positive associations with sexuality are not only being emphasized by means of exposure through the educational system and social media; researchers are promoting the importance of understanding the diverse needs of men and women at all stages of life, by means of various forms of research. Studies have shown that other ways of nurturing sexual desire throughout the aging process include valuing sexuality, maintaining the health of each partner, good sexual functioning, positive sexual self-esteem, and a sexually skillful partner.

=== Sex and gender influences ===
As previously discussed, men and women agree that what is sexually desirable for each gender differs, and understanding that the neural systems vary between genders can help to explain differences in male and female patterns of sexual desire.

==== Male and female sexual desire ====
The distinction between love and sexual desire exemplifies that they are functionally independent, however, either love can trigger sexual desire or vice versa. This bidirectional pattern is more likely to occur with women. Along with findings that women are more susceptible to the release of oxytocin, which may be partially responsible for greater female sexual fluidity, other patterns differ significantly between men and women, such as male sex drive being more responsive to visual stimuli, whereas the female sexual desire is more driven by romantic, interpersonal material. As mentioned in § Male and female conceptualizations above, male sex drive is more strongly associated with the sexualization and recreational aspect of goals of sexual desire, which is suggested to serve a stronger male reproductive drive, whereas women express greater emphasis on relational goals of sexual desire and show more variation in what they find sexually desirable than do men .
