= Gynephilic attraction in straight women =

Self-identified heterosexual women being attracted to other women

Gynephilic attraction in straight women refers to implicit or subtle same-sex attraction detected in self-identified heterosexual women. Research highlights a gap between explicit heterosexual identity and unconscious preferences for women.

A 2025 global study found 67.8% of women showed implicit gynephilic preferences via the SP-IAT, despite only 19.6% identifying as non-heterosexual; this held across continents. Straight women often exhibit this without sexual behavior or desire.

A University of Essex study found that straight women were often aroused by both male and female sexual stimuli, and that only 28% of women were mostly aroused by their preferred sex in that study

Canadian sexologist Meredith Chivers found straight women show more flexible arousal patterns than straight men, including responses to both male and female sexual stimuli. Some studies also report that a substantial share of heterosexual women admit to some same-sex attraction or fantasy, even if they still identify as straight.

Sigmund Freud acknowledged women's sexuality was more changeable and complex than men's, and he linked to an idea that girls start off with a more bisexual or less fixed sexual development. In his 1931 essay 'Female Sexuality', Freud argues girls' psychosexual development is more complex, and early attachment to the mother is central, and the development toward adulthood involves shifting both the object of desire and the bodily source of pleasure. He also argues bisexuality in women is more visible than in men, and path to "normal femininity" involves moving from clitoral to vaginal sexuality and from the mother to the father.

== Female erotic plasticity hypothesis ==
The female erotic plasticity hypothesis, proposed by psychologist Roy Baumeister in 2000, posits that female sexuality is more malleable and responsive to sociocultural and situational factors than male sexuality. While men’s sexual drives are theorized to be relatively rigid and biologically anchored after puberty, women’s eroticism is considered to have higher plasticity, allowing it to be more significantly shaped by cultural norms, education, and social context.

Baumeister coined the term "erotic plasticity", which is the extent to which one's sex drive can be shaped by socio-cultural factors. He argues that women have high plasticity, meaning that their sex drive can more easily change in response to external pressures. On the other hand, men have low plasticity, and therefore have sex drives that are relatively inflexible.

== Preferences for lesbian pornography ==
Many straight women enjoy lesbian pornography over straight porn due to a greater emphasis on female pleasure.

Annually since 2013, Pornhub Insights has released a "Year In Review" report (except in 2020 due to the COVID-19 pandemic). The data found that the lesbian category has been consistently the most popular among female viewers since 2014 when gender statistics were first gathered, and that women in general regardless of sexual orientation are more likely to search for lesbian-associated terms such as "scissoring" than men, who are typically the target audience of such content. Several articles, including those by Cosmopolitan, Glamour, and Women's Health magazines, have supported these findings through research of their own.

== Performance in lesbian pornography ==
A striking and underexamined feature of the mainstream heterosexual pornography industry is that virtually all female performers, regardless of their stated sexual identity, are expected to perform sexual acts with other women. This expectation does not have a male equivalent: male performers in straight-targeted productions are not expected to perform with other men. This asymmetry is especially conspicuous given the industry's own terminology: the label "bisexual" in pornographic production and tagging conventions refers specifically to content in which a male performer has sex with both men and women, the marked and commercially distinct case, while content featuring female performers having sex with both men and women goes unlabelled as such, despite being effectively the norm.

Empirically, female pornography performers identify as bisexual at substantially higher rates than comparable women outside the industry. Griffith et al. (2012) found that women in pornography were significantly more likely to identify as bisexual than a matched non-performer sample, though the study was unable to determine whether this identification preceded entry into the industry or emerged from it. Griffith et al. propose that the industry may function as a facilitator of sexual fluidity, providing structured opportunities and financial incentives for same-sex behavior in a context where such behavior is normalized, drawing on Diamond's (2008) research suggesting that women's sexual attractions are more responsive to situational factors than men's. Griffith et al. acknowledge, however, that examining this hypothesis rigorously would require longitudinal access to performers that has not yet been achieved.

This question has received surprisingly little systematic attention. No study has specifically investigated whether female performers' high rates of bisexual identification reflect pre-existing identity, situational development, or the industry's labelling practices. Moorman (2024) notes that dismissals of girl-on-girl performance as purely mercenary fail to account for this asymmetry: if same-sex performance were simply a financial transaction with no relationship to underlying attraction, it would be unclear why this pattern is so strongly sex-differentiated—that is, why female performers engage in it near-universally while male performers in equivalent productions do not.

== Gender differences ==
Straight‑identified women, on average, largely report more same‑sex attraction and same‑sex sexual behavior than straight‑identified men do. This pattern is thought to reflect a mix of biological, psychological, and social factors, especially around how women’s sexuality is more “fluid” or “plastic” than men’s.

Studies show that 20-33% of straight college women have kissed another woman, often at parties or socially, compared to much lower rates for men.

31.5% of heterosexual women and 13.2% of heterosexual men in the sample reported some same‑sex sexual attraction, with women generally showing higher same‑sex attraction, intention, and “aesthetic” attraction than men.

In the Kinsey Reports, 11.6% of white men aged 20–35 were given a rating of 3 on the Kinsey scale, whereas with women, 7% of single females aged 20–35 and 4% of previously married females aged 20–35 were given a rating of 3 for this period of their lives. 2 to 6% of females, aged 20–35, were given a rating of 5 and 1 to 3% of unmarried females aged 20–35 were rated as 6.

== Alloparenting hypothesis ==
An evolutionary psychology hypothesis proposes that bisexuality enables women to reduce conflict with other women in order to promote contributions to each other's childrearing, thus ensuring their reproductive success. According to this view, women are capable of forming romantic bonds with both sexes and sexual fluidity may be explained as a reproductive strategy that ensures the survival of offspring.

== In popular culture ==
In 2008, American singer Katy Perry released her debut single, 'I Kissed a Girl', about a straight woman enjoying kissing another woman. Perry, who is straight, stated that the lyrics were inspired by a female friend whom she had kissed.

== See also ==
- Heteroflexibility - Minimal homosexual activity
- Human female sexuality - Sexuality of women
