= Lesbian pornography =

Pornography depicting sex acts between females

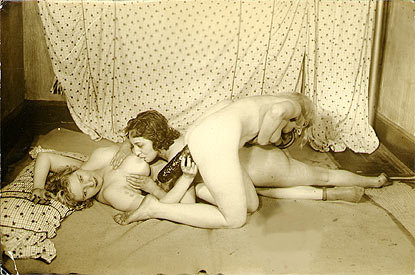
Three lesbians having sex, with salami, in a vintage pornographic photo

Lesbian pornography (or lesbian porn) is pornography that features sexual activity between women. It has ranked among the top most consumed porn categories since 2013, when data has been available. Heterosexual males particularly enjoy lesbian porn, while homosexual females and bisexual individuals are also audiences for it. It has also been found that many heterosexual females prefer this genre of pornography due to its greater focus on women's pleasure.

Homoerotic art and artifacts depicting women have a long history, reaching back to various ancient civilizations. Every medium has been used to represent women having sex with each other. In contemporary mass media, this content is primarily disseminated through home videos (including DVDs), cable broadcasts, emerging video-on-demand and wireless markets, as well as photography websites and lesbian pulp fiction.

== History ==
The 1920 French film, Le ménage moderne du Madame Butterfly, is one of the earliest films depicting women having sex with each other, if not the earliest.

Researcher Amalia Ziv stated that she considers the history of lesbian pornography to start "in the mid 1980s" because "lesbian porn is porn produced by lesbians for lesbians"; before this, the content was produced mostly by men for consumption by heterosexual men. Lesbian produced pornography began in 1984 with the erotica magazine, On Our Backs. A year later, two contributors from the magazine started Fatale Video, the first lesbian video porn company.

== Audience ==
Starting in 2013, Pornhub has published annual reports of user activities and found that the lesbian category is consistently popular, often ranking in the top 5 most viewed categories. In 2025, it was the website's overall top category, and the top viewed category in the United States, Australia, and among women.

Since 2014 when gender statistics were first gathered (except in 2020 when the data was limited), Pornhub found that women in general regardless of sexual orientation are more likely to view lesbian content and search for lesbian-associated terms such as "scissoring" than men. The popularity of lesbian pornography among women, even heterosexual women, has been examined in studies, and documented in publications like Cosmopolitan, Glamour, and Women's Health. They offer explanations such as women having higher erotic plasticity, sexual fluidity being more socially acceptable in women than in men, or the greater focus on female pleasure. Researchers at Northwestern University and the Center for Addiction and Mental Health found that heterosexual women experienced arousal from both male and female sexual stimuli, but heterosexual men were more aroused by the female stimuli. A 2007 study by psychologist Meredith Chivers found that when men were shown sexual material, their genital arousal was higher when shown material that matched their sexual orientation (women for straight men, and men for gay men). The same was not true for women, for whom the gender of the person in the sexual material mattered less than the act depicted.

Heterosexual men particularly enjoy lesbian pornography and viewing intimate acts between women. The Atlantic staff writer Olga Khazan wrote "the idea that straight men like it when two women make out (and more!) is so commonplace that it’s a cultural touchstone." Khazan referenced 2016 Pornhub stats showing that the majority of states in the U.S. had "lesbian" as the most searched term, and a Friends episode where two male characters gave up their Manhattan apartment to watch two straight female characters kiss for one minute. Conversely, women do not particularly enjoy sexual material featuring two men more than two women or one man and one woman. Neuroscientist and author Ogi Ogas explained this phenomenon by the fact that men are more aroused by visual stimuli and youthfulness, of which lesbian pornography offers twice the amount.

Deborah Swedberg, in an analysis published in the NWSA Journal in 1989, argues that it is possible for lesbian viewers to reappropriate lesbian pornography. Swedberg notes that, typically, all-women films differ from mixed pornography (with men and women) in, among other things, the settings (less anonymous and more intimate) and the very acts performed (more realistic and emotionally involved, and with a focus on the whole body rather than just the genitals): "the subject of the heterosexually produced all-women videos is female pleasure". She argues (against Laura Mulvey's "Visual Pleasure and Narrative Cineman" and Susanne Kappeler's Pornography and Representation, for example) that such movies allow for female subjectivity since the women are more than just objects of exchange. Appropriation by women of male-made lesbian erotica (such as by David Hamilton) was signaled also by Tee Corinne.

== Mainstream inauthenticity ==
Lesbian pornography has received criticism for its inauthenticity. According to author Elizabeth Whitney, "lesbianism is not acknowledged as legitimate" in lesbian pornography due to the prevalence of "heteronormatively feminine women", the experimental nature, and the constant catering to the male gaze, all of which counter real life lesbianism. Fight the New Drug says that lesbian pornography is often written for a male audience and fetishizes lesbians' sexual orientation.

A study conducted by Valerie Webber found that most actors in lesbian pornography consider their own pornographic sex somewhere on a spectrum between real and fake sex, depending on several factors. They were more likely to consider it authentic if there was a real attraction between themselves and the other actor(s) in the scene, and if they felt mutual respect between themselves and the producers.

Authenticity in pornography is disputed because some assert that the only authentic sex has no motive other than sex itself. Pornographic sex, being shot for a camera, automatically has other motives than sex itself. On the other side, some assert that all pornographic sex is authentic since the sex is an occurrence that took place, and that is all that is needed to classify it as authentic.

Concerning the authenticity of their performance, most lesbian pornographic actors describe their performance as an exaggerated, altered version of their real personality, providing some authenticity to the performance. Authenticity depends on real life experiences, so some lesbian pornographic actors feel the need to create an entirely different persona to feel safe. Webber writes of Agatha, a queer actor in lesbian pornography who "prefers that the activity and ambiance of her performances be very inauthentic, because otherwise it feels 'too close to home'", referring to the oppression and verbal abuse she is subject to by homophobic men in her daily life.

== Penetration ==
Like in straight and gay male pornography, there is an emphasis on penetration in lesbian pornography. Even though studies have found that dildos have minimal use in real life lesbian sexual activity, lesbian pornography prominently features dildos. According to Lydon, the ability to achieve orgasm clitorally, as opposed to penetratively, eliminates the need for a phallus and, by extension, for a man. For this reason, male producers continue to include, and male viewers continue to demand, a phallus as a central feature in lesbian pornography.

== See also ==
- Bisexual pornography – Pornography depicting bisexuality
- Erotic literature – Literary genre
- Erotica – Category of sexually stimulating media
- Fetishization of LGBTQ people
- Porn for women – Pornography aimed at female audiences
- Sex industry – Field of business
- Yuri – Fiction genre depicting female same-sex relationships
