= Mel Robbins =

American author and podcast host (born 1968)

- Born: Melanie Lee Schneeberger; October 6, 1968 (age 58); Kansas City, Missouri, U.S.
- Other names: Mel Robbins; Mel Schneeberger
- Education: Dartmouth College (BA); Boston College Law School (JD)
- Occupations: Author; Lawyer; Speaker; Podcast host
- Years active: 1996—present
- Spouse: Chris Robbins (m. 1996)
- Children: 3
- Website: melrobbins.com

Melanie Lee Robbins (née Schneeberger; born October 6, 1968) is an American author, podcast host, and lawyer.

Robbins gained recognition for her TEDx talk, How to Stop Screwing Yourself Over. Her books include Stop Saying You're Fine (2011), The 5 Second Rule (2017), The High 5 Habit (2021), and The Let Them Theory (2024). She has been hosting The Mel Robbins Podcast since 2022.

== Early life ==
Melanie Lee Schneeberger was born on October 6, 1968, in Kansas City, Missouri. She grew up in North Muskegon, Michigan, and graduated from Dartmouth College. She earned her J.D. from Boston College Law School in 1994.

== Career ==
=== 1990s–2000s ===
Following law school, Robbins worked as a public defender in New York, including at the Legal Aid Society. In 1999, she began working as a life coach and executive coach in Boston. In 2007, she broke into radio with a local radio show Make It Happen with Mel Robbins which ran for a year.

=== 2010s–2020s ===
During the early 2010s, Robbins hosted a few local radio shows. In May 2011, she published her debut book Stop Saying You're Fine. The following month she gave a viral TEDx talk titled How to Stop Screwing Yourself Over, where she introduced the "five second rule" technique.

In 2012, when George Zimmerman fatally shot Trayvon Martin, Robbins was hosting a radio show in Orlando, Florida and covered the aftermath. In 2013, she was brought on CNN as a legal analyst during the Zimmerman trial.

For the next few years Robbins worked as a radio show host, CNN legal analyst, and motivational speaker. In 2017, she published her second book, The 5 Second Rule, which became a bestseller.

In 2019, Robbins hosted The Mel Robbins Show produced by Sony Pictures TV, which ran for one season. In 2021, she published her third book, The High 5 Habit followed by a fourth book cowritten by her daughter, The Let Them Theory in 2024. Both books were bestsellers. In 2025, Robbins began her first world tour: "Let Them The Tour".

=== The Mel Robbins Podcast ===
In 2022, Robbins launched The Mel Robbins Podcast which by 2025 was one of the most popular podcasts in the United States. The podcast, and Robbins as the host, have received many accolades including an iHeartRadio Podcast Award and a Golden Globes nomination.

=== The Let Them Theory ===
The Let Them Theory, published in 2024, is a mantra marketed by Robbins which claims to reduce stress by encouraging an individual to focus only on what they can control by ignoring gossip and external criticism. The mantra received criticism due to its lack of evidence to support its claims, along with arguments that abiding to the mantra absolves the individual from being introspective. Robbins responded to the claim that the book's idea is "so obvious it's laughable" by saying "Yeah, it is a cheap trick – and it works".

Robbins's book was preceded by the online circulation of a poem, "Let Them", by Cassie Phillips in 2022. Phillips's poem contains lines such as "If they are showing you who they are and not what you perceived them to be, LET THEM"; in her book, Robbins writes, "Let Them show you who they are". A representative for Robbins told Atlantic journalist Olga Khazan that "neither Mel, the fact checkers, the researchers nor the publishers saw [Phillips's] poem"; Robbins said the mantra came from her daughter's exhortation to let her son go to a taquería before a school prom dance.

== Awards and recognition ==
- Gracie Award for Outstanding Host – News/Non-fiction (2014)
- Webby Award – Health Wellness, and Lifestyle Podcast "People's Voice" (2023)
- Forbes "50 Over 50" (2023)
- Webby Award – Health, Wellness, and Lifestyle Podcast "People's Voice" (2025)
- iHeartRadio Podcast Award "Best Overall Host" (2025)
- Time "Time100 Creators 2025" (2025)
- Golden Globes Nomination "Best Podcast" (2026)

== Personal life ==
Robbins married Christopher Robbins in 1996. The couple has three children and live in Vermont. Robbins has spoken publicly about being diagnosed with ADHD, anxiety, and dyslexia.

== Bibliography ==
- Stop Saying You're Fine (2011)
- The 5 Second Rule (2017)
- The High 5 Habit (2021)
- The Let Them Theory (2024)
