= Sexual desire =

Psychological feature arousing organisms to physical pleasure and reproduction

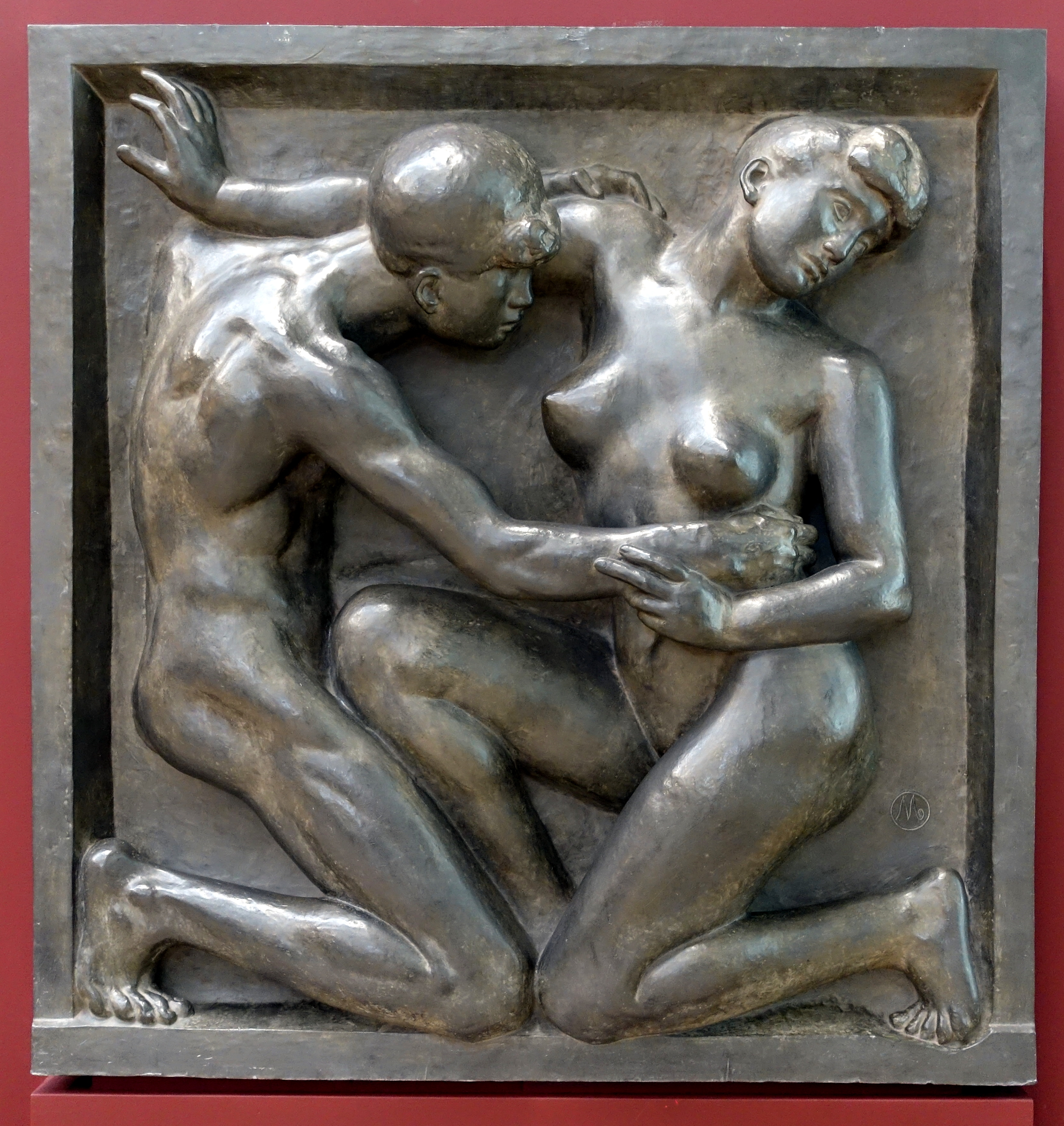
Désir, by Aristide Maillol

Sexual desire is an emotion and motivational state characterized by an interest in sexual objects or activities, or by a drive to seek out sexual objects or to engage in sexual activities. It is an aspect of sexuality, which varies significantly from one person to another, and also fluctuates depending on circumstances. It may be the single most common sexual event in human life.

Sexual desire is a subjective feeling state that can be triggered by both internal and external cues, and that may or may not result in overt sexual behaviour. Desire can be aroused through imagination and sexual fantasies, or by perceiving an individual whom one finds attractive. It is also created and amplified through sexual tension, which is caused by sexual desire that has yet to be acted on. Physical manifestations of sexual desire in humans include licking, sucking, tongue protrusion, and puckering and touching the lips.

Desire can be spontaneous or responsive, positive or negative, and can vary in intensity along a spectrum.

== Theoretical perspectives ==
Theorists and researchers employ two frameworks in their understanding of human sexual desire. The first is a biological framework, also known as sex drive (or libido), in which sexual desire comes from an innate motivational force like an instinct, drive, need, urge, wish, or want. The second is a sociocultural theory in which desire is conceptualized as one factor in a much larger context (e.g., relationships nested within societies, nested within cultures).

=== Biological framework ===
The biological approach views sexual drives as similar to other physical drives, such as hunger. An individual will seek out food—or, in the case of desire, pleasure—in order to reduce or avoid pain. Sex drive can be thought of as a biological need or craving that inspires individuals to seek out and become receptive to sexual experiences and sexual pleasure. Incentive motivation theory exists under this framework and states that the strength of motivation toward sexual activity depends on the strength or immediacy of the stimuli. If satiety is achieved, the strength of the incentive will increase in the future.

Sex drive is strongly tied to biological factors such as "chromosomal and hormonal status, nutritional status, age, and general health". Sexual desire is the first of four phases of the human sexual response cycle, followed by arousal, orgasm, and resolution. However, while it is part of the response cycle, desire is believed to be distinct from genital sexual arousal. It has also been argued that desire is not a distinct phase in sexual response, but rather something that persists through arousal and orgasm or even longer. Although orgasm might make it difficult for a man to maintain his erection or a woman to continue with vaginal lubrication, sexual desire can persist nevertheless.

=== Sociocultural framework ===
In the sociocultural framework, desire indicates a longing for sexual activity for its own sake and not for any other purpose other than enjoyment, satisfaction, or the release of sexual tension. Sexual desire and activity may be produced to help achieve other means or to gain non-sexual rewards, such as increased closeness and attachment between partners. Under this framework, sexual desire is not an urge, implying that individuals have more conscious control over their desire.

Sociocultural influences may push males and females into gender-specific roles in which social scripts dictate the appropriate feelings and responses to desire. This may lead to frustration if an individual's wants remain unfulfilled due to anticipated social consequences.

Some theorists suggest that the experience of sexual desire may be socially constructed. Others argue that, although sociocultural factors greatly influence desire, they do not play a large role until after biological factors initiate it. Another view is that sexual desire is neither a social construction nor a biological drive. According to James Giles, it is an existential need based on the sense of incompleteness that arises from the experience of being gendered.

Many researchers believe that relying on a single approach to the study of human sexuality is counterproductive, and that the integrations of and interactions among multiple approaches allow for the most comprehensive understanding. Sexual desire can manifest itself in more than one way; it is a "variety of different behaviours, cognitions, and emotions, taken together".

Levine suggests that sexual desire has three components that link several theoretical perspectives together:

- Drive: The biological component. This includes anatomy and neuroendocrinology.
- Motivation: The psychological component. This includes personal mental states (mood), interpersonal states (e.g., mutual affection or disagreement), and social context (e.g., relationship status).
- Wish: The cultural component. This includes cultural ideals, values, and rules about sexual expression that are external to the individual.

== Sex differences ==
In early life, usually before puberty, males are quite flexible regarding their preferred sexual incentive, but they later become inflexible. Females, on the other hand, remain flexible throughout their life cycle. This change in sexuality due to variations in situational, cultural, and social factors is called erotic plasticity. Beyond this, very little is known about sexual desire and sexual arousal in prepubescent children, or whether any feelings they may have are comparable to what they will experience as an adult.

Boys typically experience and commence sexual interest and activity before girls do. Men, on average, also have higher sex drives and desire for sexual activity than women do; this is correlated with the finding that men report more lifetime sexual partners, although mathematicians say it is logically impossible for heterosexual men to have more partners on average than heterosexual women. Sex drive is also related to sociosexuality scores: The higher the sex drive, the less restricted the sociosexual orientation (i.e., the willingness to have sex outside of a committed relationship). This is especially the case for women.

Lippa used data from a BBC internet survey to examine cross-cultural patterns in sex differences for three traits: sex drive, sociosexuality, and height. These traits all showed consistent sex differences across nations, although women were found to be more variable than men in their sex drive. On average, male sexual desire is stronger and more frequent than women's, and lasts longer into the life cycle. Though women do not experience sexual desire as often as men, when they do, the intensity of the experience is equal to that of men. Societal perceptions of men and women—in addition to perceptions about acceptable sexual behaviour (e.g., men are expected to be more sexual and sometimes insatiable, while women are expected to be more reserved)—may contribute to expressed levels of sexual desire and satisfaction. The contribution of contextual factors such as gendered societal perceptions and differences in quality of sexual experiences has led some researchers to question the true extent of sex differences in sexual desire and to caution against attributing them primarily to innate biology. Even without fully accounting for these influences, large-scale analyses find considerable overlap between men and women, with more variation occurring within sexes than between them.

DeLamater and Sill found that affect and feelings concerning the importance of sexual activity can affect levels of desire. In their study, women who said that sexual activity was important to the quality of their lives and relationships demonstrated low desire, while women who placed less emphasis on sexual activity in their lives demonstrated high desire. Men presented similar results. These findings were corroborated by Conaglen and Evans, who assessed whether levels of sexual desire influenced emotional responses and cognitive processing of sexual pictorial stimuli. They found that women with lower sexual desire responded to sexual stimuli more quickly in the picture recognition task, but rated the sexual images as less arousing and less pleasant than women with higher sexual desire.

When presented with explicit sexual imagery and stimuli, women can become physically aroused without experiencing psychological desire or arousal. In one study, 97% of women reported having had sexual intercourse without experiencing sexual desire, while only 60% of men reported the same thing. Also, women may form a more significant association between sexual desire and attachment than men.

Women may be more prone to fluctuations in desire due to the many phases and biological changes the female body experiences, such as menstrual cycles, pregnancy, lactation, and menopause. Though these changes are occasionally unnoticeable, women seem to have increased levels of sexual desire during ovulation and decreased levels during menstruation. An abrupt decline in androgen production can cause cessation of sexual thoughts and failure to respond to sexual cues and triggers that would previously have elicited desire. This is seen especially in postmenopausal women who have low levels of testosterone. Doses of testosterone administered transdermally have been found to improve sexual desire and sexual functioning.

Older individuals are less likely to describe themselves as being at the extremes of the sexual desire spectrum. By the time individuals reach middle and old age, there is a natural decline in sexual desire, sexual capacity, and the frequency of sexual behaviour. DeLamater and Sill found that the majority of men and women do not officially report themselves as having low levels of sexual desire until they are 76 years old. Many attribute this decline to partner familiarity, alienation, or preoccupation with nonsexual matters such as social, relational, and health concerns.

== Measuring and assessing ==
Defining sexual desire is a challenge because it can be conceptualized in many ways. Researchers consider the definition used in the American Psychiatric Association's Diagnostic and Statistical Manual IV-TR (DSM-IV-TR), as well as what men and women understand their own desire to be. The lack of agreed-upon parameters for normal versus abnormal levels of sexual desire creates challenges in the measurement of desire and the diagnosis of sexual desire disorders.

Many researchers seek to assess sexual desire by examining self-reported data and observing the frequency of participants' sexual behaviour. This method can pose a problem because it emphasizes only the behavioural aspects of sexual desire and does not account for cognitive or biological influences that motivate people to seek out and become receptive to sexual opportunities.

Several scales have been developed to measure the factors influencing the development and expression of sexual desire. One is the Sexual Desire Inventory (SDI), a self-administered questionnaire that defines sexual desire as "interest in or wish for sexual activity". The SDI measures thoughts and experiences. Fourteen questions assess the strength, frequency, and importance of an individual's desire for sexual activity with others and by themselves. The scale proposes that desire can be split into two categories: dyadic and solitary desire. Dyadic desire refers to an "interest in or a wish to engage in sexual activity with another person and desire for sharing and intimacy with another", while solitary desire refers to "an interest in engaging in sexual behaviour by oneself, and may involve a wish to refrain from intimacy and sharing with others".

The Sexual Interest and Desire Inventory-Female (SIDI-F) was the first validated instrument developed to specifically assess the severity of hypoactive sexual desire disorder and responses to treatment for the disorder in females. The SIDI-F consists of thirteen items that assess a woman's satisfaction with her relationship; her recent sexual experiences, both with her partner and alone; her enthusiasm for, desire for, and receptivity to sexual behaviour; distress over her level of desire; and arousal. The scale has a maximum score of 51, with higher scores representing increased levels of sexual functioning.

== Factors affecting ==
Levels of sexual desire may fluctuate over time due to internal and external factors.

=== Social and relationship influences ===
One's social situation can refer to the social circumstances of life, their present stage of life, or the state of their romantic relationship. It may also refer to their non-relationship status. Whether people think that their experience of desire or lack of experience is problematic depends on social circumstances such as the presence or absence of a partner. As social beings, many people seek lifetime partners and wish to experience that connection and intimacy. People often consider sexual desire essential to romantic attraction and relationship development. The experience of desire can ebb and flow with time, increasing familiarity with one's partner, and changes in relationship dynamics and priorities.

=== Disorders ===
Two sexual desire disorders are listed in the Diagnostic and Statistical Manual IV-TR (DSM-5-TR):

- Hypoactive sexual desire disorder (HSDD) is defined as persistently or recurrently deficient (or absent) sexual fantasies and desire for sexual activity which causes marked distress or interpersonal difficulty. This definition has been criticized for placing too much emphasis on sexual fantasies, which are usually used to supplement arousal. As a result, a group of sexuality researchers and clinicians have proposed the addition of sexual desire/interest disorder (SDID) to the DSM in hopes that it may more accurately encompass concerns experienced by women in particular. SDID is defined as low sexual desire, absent sexual fantasies, and a lack of responsive desire.
- Sexual aversion disorder (SAD) is defined as persistent or recurrent, extreme aversion to and avoidance of all or almost all genital sexual contact with a sexual partner. SAD is considered more severe than HSDD. Some have questioned its placement within the sexual dysfunction category of the DSM and have called for it to be moved to the specific phobia grouping as an anxiety disorder.

Both HSDD and SAD have been found to be more prevalent in females than males; this is especially the case with SAD.

Hypersexual disorder is associated with sexual addiction and sexual compulsivity. According to a proposed revision to the DSM, which would include it in future publications, hypersexual disorder is defined as recurrent and intense sexual fantasies, sexual urges, and sexual behavior where the individual is consumed with excessive sexual desire and repeatedly engages in sexual behaviour in response to dysphoric mood states and stressful life events.

=== Health ===
A serious or chronic illness can have an enormous effect on sexual desire. An individual in poor health may be able to experience desire but not have the motivation or strength to have sex. Chronic disorders like cardiovascular disease, diabetes, arthritis, enlarged prostate (in men), Parkinson's disease, cancer, and high blood pressure can negatively affect sexual desire, sexual functioning, and sexual response.

There have been conflicting findings on the effect of diabetes on sexual desire, especially in men. Some studies have found that diabetic men show lower levels of desire than healthy, age-matched counterparts, while others have found no difference.

=== Medications ===
Certain medications can cause changes in the level of sexual desire through nonspecific effects on well-being, energy, and mood. Declining sexual desire has been linked to the use of anti-hypertension medication and many psychiatric medications, including antipsychotics, tricyclic antidepressants, monoamine-oxidase inhibitors (MAOIs), and sedatives. The psychiatric medications that most severely decrease sexual desire are selective serotonin reuptake inhibitors (SSRIs). Higher dosages of these medications are also correlated with a lowering of sexual desire.

In women, anticoagulants, cardiovascular medications, statins, and anti-hypertension drugs contribute to low levels of desire. However, in men, only anticoagulants and anti-hypertension medications have been found to be related to low levels of desire. Oral contraceptives can also lower sexual desire in as many as one in four women who use them. They are known to increase levels of sex hormone-binding globulin (SHBG) in the body, and high SHBG levels are in turn associated with a decline in desire.

Methamphetamine and other amphetamines increase sexual desire as a result of their effect on motivational salience.

=== Hormones ===
Sexual desire is said to be influenced by androgens in men and by both androgens and estrogens in women.

Many studies associate the sex hormone testosterone with sexual desire. Another hormone thought to influence sexual desire is oxytocin. Exogenous administration of moderate amounts of oxytocin has been found to stimulate females to desire and seek out sexual activity. In women, oxytocin levels are at their highest during sexual activity.

=== Interventions ===
Medical interventions are available for individuals who feel sexually bored, experience performance anxiety, or are unable to orgasm.

For everyday life, a 2013 fact sheet from the Association for Reproductive Health Professionals recommends erotic literature and recalling instances when one felt sexy and sexual.

== Social and religious views ==
Views on sexual desire and how it should be expressed vary significantly among societies and religions. Ideologies range from sexual repression to hedonism.

Laws concerning specific forms of sexual activity, such as homosexual acts and sex outside marriage, vary by geography. In some countries, such as Saudi Arabia, Pakistan, Afghanistan, Iran, Kuwait, Maldives, Morocco, Oman, Mauritania, United Arab Emirates, Sudan, and Yemen, any form of sexual activity outside marriage is illegal.

Some societies have a double standard regarding male and female expressions of desire. Female genital mutilation is practiced in some regions in an attempt to prevent women from acting on their sexual desires.
