= Alloparenting hypothesis =

Hypothesis about women's attraction to other women

The alloparenting hypothesis is an evolutionary psychology hypothesis that proposes gynephilic attraction in straight women evolved in part because it helped women form strong bonds with other women who could assist in raising children. It was proposed by Barry X. Kuhle and Sarah Radtke in 2013 in an article titled Born Both Ways: The Alloparenting Hypothesis for Sexual Fluidity in Women.
