= Lovemap =

Sexological concept

The lovemap is a concept originated by sexologist John Money in his discussions of how people develop their sexual preferences. Money defined it as "a developmental representation or template in the mind and in the brain depicting the idealized lover and the idealized program of sexual and erotic activity projected in imagery or actually engaged in with that lover."

== History ==
John Money first wrote the word lovemap in 1980 for an article later published under the title "Pairbonding and Limerence". Prior to that, Money discussed lovemaps in a precursory form with his students in lectures, employing the term as a replacement for the expression, "an idealized and highly idiosyncratic image." In a 1997 article in the controversial and non-peer reviewed journal Medical Hypotheses, Money revisited the concept of 'love map' and expanded it to three categories, haptoerotic (cutaneous), morphoerotic (visual) and gnomoerotic (narrative).

Since its inception, the concept of "love maps", applied to interpersonal relationships, has found some acceptance and is frequently referenced in books about love and sexuality. Glenn Wilson and Chris McLaughlin discussed it in their 2001 book The Science of Love.

== Development and expression ==
Money describes the formation of an individual's lovemap as similar to the acquisition of a native language, in that it becomes established at an early age and bears the mark of the person's unique individuality, like an accent in a spoken language. According to Money, lovemaps are not present at birth, but begin to develop shortly thereafter, and manifest in full after puberty. The individual may not discover certain aspects of their lovemap until triggered by a relevant experience (such as pornography use) later in life.

Psychologist Gregory Lehne states that lovemaps may be influenced by genetic or prenatal factors, but that their specific content must come from the senses. Lehne says that some perceptions are encoded in the person's lovemap after becoming sexualized for uncertain reasons, possibly because of their associations with provoked or random autonomic arousal, sexual arousal, or hormonal fluctuations. These associations typically form during experiences before the age of eight, Money proposes. As an example, Lehne argues that a child who accidentally becomes sexually aroused during spanking may go on to develop an interest in erotic spanking. Once formed, the lovemap is extremely difficult to alter.

A lovemap is usually quite specific as to details of the physiognomy, build, race, color, temperament, and manner of the ideal lover. Money suggests that love is like an inkblot test, where pair-bonding occurs if projections (shaped by a person's lovemap) on the other are mutual, typically in a courtship phase of mating.

== Variations ==
Money analyzed a large range of sexual predilections and behaviors using his model of the "lovemap". In his book on the subject, some of the most notable concepts include:

- Heterosexual lovemaps – love mappings associative to persons of the opposite gender.
- Homosexual lovemaps – love mappings associative to persons of the same gender.
- Bisexual lovemaps – love mappings associative to persons of both genders.
- Vandalized lovemaps – According to Money, these occur when the love mapping process becomes traumatized, as when a young child is either exposed to, or forced to participate in such inappropriate behaviors as child sexual abuse, incest, or sadomasochism. He states that such a lovemap is typically formed between the ages of five and eight. A vandalized lovemap may be paraphilic or hyposexual.
- Paraphilic lovemaps – when lust is attached to fantasies and practices that are socially forbidden, disapproved of, ridiculed, or penalized. According to Money, it can result from lust being displaced from a "vandalized" area of an ordinary lovemap following abuse. Alternatively, Money suggests that a paraphilic lovemap could arise from a non-sexual childhood experience that induced genital arousal in the child.

== See also ==
- Erotic plasticity
- Mental model
- Sexual script theory
- David Reimer
