= Human sexual response cycle =

Four-stage model of physiological responses to sexual stimulation

The human sexual response cycle is a four-stage model of physiological responses to sexual stimulation, which, in order of their occurrence, are the excitement, plateau, orgasmic, and resolution phases. This physiological response model was first formulated by William H. Masters and Virginia E. Johnson, in their 1966 book Human Sexual Response. Since that time, other models regarding human sexual response have been formulated by several scholars who have criticized certain inaccuracies in the human sexual response cycle model.

== Excitement phase ==
The excitement phase (also known as the arousal phase or initial excitement phase) is the first stage of the human sexual response cycle, which occurs as a result of physical or mental erotic stimuli, such as kissing, making out, fantasizing or viewing erotic images, that leads to sexual arousal. During this stage, the body prepares for sexual intercourse, initially leading to the plateau phase. There is wide socio-cultural variation regarding preferences for the length of foreplay and the stimulation methods used. Physical and emotional interaction and stimulation of the erogenous zones during foreplay usually establishes at least some initial arousal.

=== Excitement in both sexes ===
Among both sexes, the excitement phase results in an increase in heart rate, breathing rate, and a rise in blood pressure. A survey in 2006 found that sexual arousal in about 82% of young females and 52% of young males arises or is enhanced by direct stimulation of nipples, with only 7–8% reporting that it decreased their arousal. Vasocongestion of the skin, commonly referred to as the sex flush, will occur in approximately 50-75% of females and 25% of males. The sex flush tends to occur more often under warmer conditions and may not appear at all under cooler temperatures.

During the female sex flush, pinkish spots develop under the breasts, then spread to the breasts, torso, face, hands, soles of the feet, and possibly over the entire body. Vasocongestion is also responsible for the darkening of the clitoris and the walls of the vagina during sexual arousal. During the male sex flush, the coloration of the skin develops less consistently than in the female, but typically starts with the epigastrium (upper abdomen), spreads across the chest, then continues to the neck, face, forehead, back, and sometimes, shoulders and forearms. The sex flush typically disappears soon after orgasm occurs, but this may take up to two hours or so and, sometimes, intense sweating will occur simultaneously. The flush usually diminishes in reverse of the order in which it appeared.

An increase in muscle tone (myotonia) of certain muscle groups, occurring voluntarily and involuntarily, begins during this phase among both sexes. Also, the external anal sphincter may contract randomly upon contact (or later during orgasm without contact).

=== Excitement in males ===
In males, the beginning of the excitement phase is observed when the penis becomes partially or fully erect, often after only a few seconds of erotic stimulation. The erection may be partially lost and regained repeatedly during an extended excitement phase. Both testicles become drawn upward toward the perineum, notably in circumcised males where less skin is available to accommodate the erection. Also, the scrotum can tense and thicken during the erection process.

=== Excitement in females ===
In females, the excitement phase can last from several minutes to several hours. The onset of vasocongestion results in swelling of the woman's clitoris, labia minora and vagina. The muscle that surrounds the vaginal opening grows tighter and the uterus elevates and grows in size. The vaginal walls begin to produce a lubricating organic liquid. Meanwhile, the breasts increase slightly in size and nipples become hardened and erect.

== Plateau phase ==
The plateau phase is the period of sexual excitement prior to orgasm. The phase is characterised by an increased circulation and heart rate in both sexes, increased sexual pleasure with increased stimulation and further increased muscle tension. Also, respiration continues at an elevated level. Prolonged time in the plateau phase without progression to the orgasmic phase may result in sexual frustration.

=== Plateau in males ===
During this phase, the male urethral sphincter contracts (preventing urine from mixing with semen, and retrograde ejaculation) and muscles at the base of the penis begin a steady rhythmic contraction. Males may start to secrete seminal fluid or pre-ejaculatory fluid and the testicles rise closer to the body.

=== Plateau in females ===
The plateau stage in females is a continuation of the same changes evident in the excitement stage. The clitoris becomes extremely sensitive and withdraws slightly, and the Bartholin glands produce further lubrication. The tissues of the outer third of the vagina swell, and the pubococcygeus muscle tightens, reducing the diameter of the opening of the vagina. Masters and Johnson refer to the changes that take place during the plateau stage as the orgasmic platform.

== Orgasm phase ==
Orgasm is experienced by both males and females, ending the plateau phase of the sexual response cycle. Orgasm is accompanied by quick cycles of muscle contraction in the lower pelvic muscles, which surround both the anus and the primary sexual organs. Orgasms are often associated with other involuntary actions, including vocalizations and muscular spasms in other areas of the body and a generally euphoric sensation. Heart rate is increased even further. Tantric sex practices may seek to diminish the goal of achieving orgasm, which is frequently a goal of sexual intercourse.

=== Orgasm in males ===
In males, orgasm is usually associated with ejaculation. Each ejaculation is accompanied with continuous pulses of sexual pleasure, especially in the penis and surrounding area. Other sensations may be felt strongly among the lower spine or lower back. The first and second convulsions are usually the most intense in sensation and produce the greatest quantity of semen. Thereafter, each contraction is associated with a diminishing volume of semen and a milder sensation of pleasure.

=== Orgasm in females ===
Women also experience uterine and vaginal contractions. Orgasms in females can vary widely from individual to individual. They are commonly associated with an increase in vaginal lubrication, a tightening of the vaginal walls and overall pleasure. For some women, there is also a possibility of female ejaculation.

== Resolution phase ==
The resolution phase occurs after orgasm and allows the muscles to relax, blood pressure to drop and the body to slow down from its excited state. The refractory period, which is part of the resolution phase, is the time frame in which usually a man is unable to orgasm again, though women can also experience a refractory period.

=== Resolution in males ===
Masters and Johnson described the two-stage detumescence of the penis: In the first stage, the penis decreases from its erect state to about 50 percent larger than its flaccid state. This occurs during the refractory period. In the second stage (and after the refractory period is finished), the penis decreases in size and returns to being flaccid. It is generally impossible for men to achieve orgasm during the refractory period. Masters and Johnson argue that this period must end before men can become aroused again.

Although, due to the refractory period, it is rare for men to achieve multiple orgasms, some men have reported having multiple, consecutive orgasms, particularly without ejaculation. Multiple orgasms are more commonly reported in very young men than in older men. In younger men, the refractory period may only last a few minutes, but last more than an hour in older men.

=== Resolution in females ===
According to Masters and Johnson, women have the ability to orgasm again very quickly, as long as they have effective stimulation. As a result, they are able to have multiple orgasms in a relatively short period of time. Though generally reported that women do not experience a refractory period and thus can experience an additional orgasm, or multiple orgasms, soon after the first, some sources state that women do experience a refractory period. For some women, the clitoris is very sensitive after climax, making additional stimulation initially painful. After the initial orgasm, subsequent orgasms for women may also be stronger or more pleasurable as the stimulation accumulates.

== Similarities and differences between sexes ==
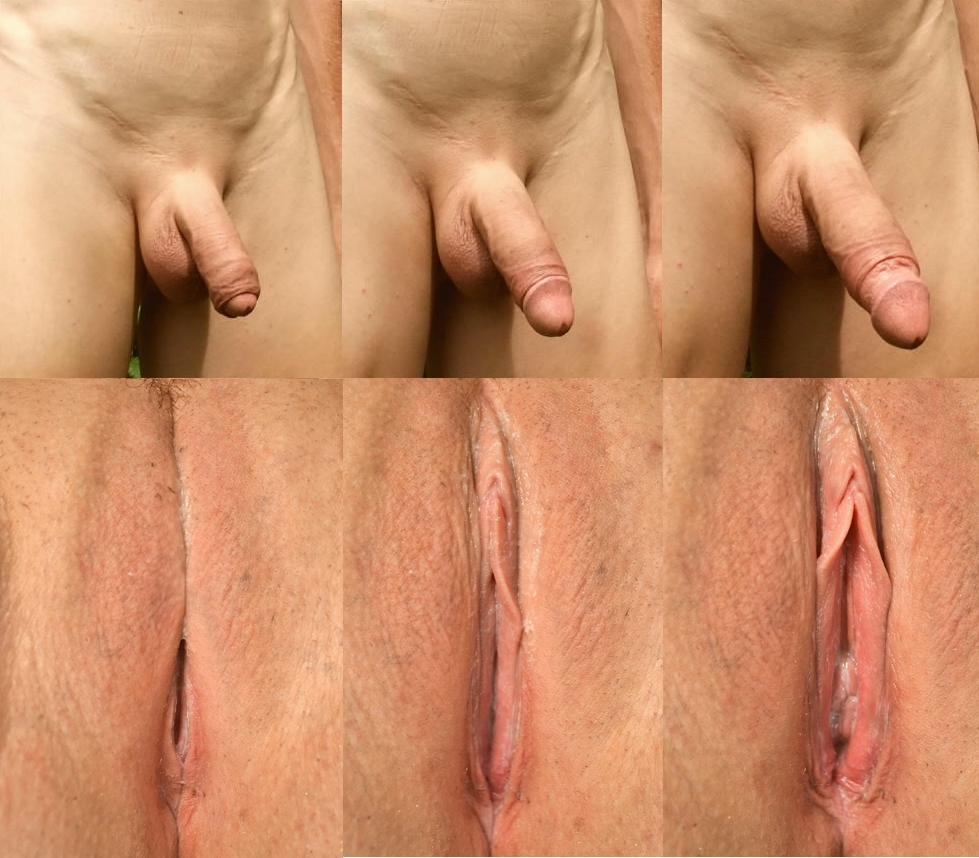
During the sexual arousal phase, there is increased blood pressure in the genitals; this leads to swelling of the penis (top row), or clitoris and labia (bottom row).

Masters and Johnson argue that, despite some minor differences, sexual responses in both men and women are fundamentally similar. However, researchers have argued that there are many differences between men and women in terms of their response. First, Masters and Johnson put forth one model for men, but three different models for women. They stated that men's and women's sexual response are largely similar in terms of duration and intensity. These variations can pose problems because psychologists have argued that not everyone fits this model; for example, most women do not orgasm during penetrative sexual intercourse. Masters and Johnson also equate a man's erection with a woman's vaginal lubrication during the excitement phase; Roy Levin states that this observation is false. A woman's clitoris is the anatomical parallel to a man's penis. As a result, clitoral swelling would be the equivalent of a man's erection.

Another aspect is the lack of concordance between subjective sexual arousal and genital arousal. Research by Meredith L. Chivers and J. Michael Bailey indicates that men tend to show category-specific arousal; that is, they are sexually aroused by their preferred gender. However, women show category non-specificity: Their genitals show arousal to both preferred and non-preferred genders. Even though women reported being subjectively aroused to, for example, a man and woman engaging in sexual activity, their genitals also show sexual arousal to two men engaging in sexual activity, two women doing so, and even non-human animals having sex.

Overall, Masters and Johnson's model appears to be a better example of men's sexual response than women's.

== Criticisms ==
There has been much research conducted based on Masters and Johnson's model. However, inaccuracies have been found in the descriptions of the stages of sexual response. For example, Roy Levin identified a few areas of the model that had not been touched upon. First, Masters and Johnson state that only the vagina is lubricated during the arousal stage; Levin argues that the labia produce their own lubricant. Levin also presents research which shows that the first sign of physiological arousal in women is increased blood flow to the vagina, not lubrication. He also dispels information about men and their sexual response; Masters and Johnson report that pleasure was positively associated with the volume of ejaculate released, but Rosenberg, Hazzard, Tallman and Ohl gave a group of men a questionnaire and found that significantly more men reported that physical pleasure was associated with the strength of the ejaculation compared to the volume. Moreover, some researchers have found that some men can have multiple orgasms, despite what Masters and Johnson had reported.

Some researchers have also criticized how Masters and Johnson define sexual response solely in terms of physiology; for example, Everaerd, and Laan have found that sexual arousal can be defined as an emotional state in both men and women. Other researchers have stated that there is a lack of concordance between women's subjective sexual arousal and their genital arousal. Rosemary Basson argues that this model poorly explains women's sexual response, especially for those who are in long-term relationships.

== Other models ==
Shortly after Masters and Johnson published their book, several scholars criticized their model of the human sexual response cycle. For example, Helen Singer Kaplan argued that Masters and Johnson only evaluated sexual response from a physiological perspective, and that psychological, emotional, and cognitive factors need to be taken into consideration. As a result, she proposed her model of the sexual response cycle which includes three phases: desire, excitement, and orgasm. She argues that these three phases are interconnected, yet they have different neurophysiological mechanisms. Similarly, Paul Robinson argued that the excitement and plateau phases are the same; he criticizes Masters and Johnson's work for not clearly distinguishing when the excitement phase ends, and when the plateau phase begins.

Another model that has been put forth is the incentive-motivation model. The model explains that the desire for sex comes from an interaction between a sensitive sexual response system and stimuli that are present in the environment. Researchers argue that this model supports the idea that sexual desire is not spontaneous. Furthermore, this model implies that the case is not that one has sex because one feels sexual desire; rather, the case is that one feels sexual desire because one has sex.

Rosemary Basson proposed an alternative model of sexual response. She argues that the linear model is good at explaining men's sexual response but it poorly explains women's sexual responses; thus, she puts forth a circular model. She states that closeness or attachment to a partner increases the effectiveness of sexual stimulation. This leads to enhanced sexual arousal, which may ultimately result in orgasm. Consequently, this positive sexual arousal continues the sexual desire that women feel, and this desire increases intimacy with the partner. Other researchers have attempted to evaluate women's sexual functioning in terms of this new model but have found contradictory results. In one study conducted by Giles and McCabe, they found that the linear model of sexual response was a good predictor of women's sexual functioning (and dysfunction), while the circular model was a poor predictor. Once they modified the pathways of the model, the circular model then became a good predictor of sexual functioning. In another study looking at Malaysian women, researchers found that the circular model was actually a good predictor of women's sexual desire and arousal. More research needs to be done in this area to show whether the circular model more accurately describes women's sexual response.

== Sexual dysfunctions ==
The human sexual response cycle set the foundation for studying and categorizing sexual dysfunctions in men and women. There are four main categories of sexual dysfunctions: desire disorders, arousal disorders, orgasm disorders, and sexual pain disorders. They are still categorized as such in the DSM-IV-TR. Recent research, however, suggests that the current model of sexual response needs to be revised to better treat these dysfunctions. One reason is that there is considerable overlap between sexual dysfunctions in women. One study found that in patients with hypoactive sexual desire disorder (HSDD), 41% of women had at least one other sexual dysfunction and 18% had diagnoses in all three categories (that is, in desire, arousal, and orgasm disorders).

Another issue is that, among women, there is a discrepancy between desire and arousal. After Cynthia Graham critically evaluated female sexual arousal disorder (FSAD), she found that women reported that, contrary to Masters and Johnson's model, sexual arousal sometimes preceded sexual desire; at other times, desire presented before arousal. Because of the high comorbidity rates between HSDD and FSAD, she would like to merge them to make the category "Sexual Interest/Arousal Disorder." Hartmann and colleagues summarize their views of the current model of the sexual response cycle and conclude that "by simply expanding and continuing DSM-IV criteria and the traditional response cycle classification systems, it is impossible to come to diagnostic categories and subtypes that adequately reflect real-life female sexual problems".

== See also ==
- Erogenous zone
- Foreplay
- Manual sex
- Oral sex
- Orgastic potency
- Sexual attraction
