= Orgasmic platform =

Vaginal tissues

The orgasmic platform is the tissues of the outer third of the vagina, labeled by Masters and Johnson. They swell considerably, and the pubococcygeus muscle tightens, reducing the diameter of the opening of the vagina. During orgasm, women experience rhythmic contractions of the orgasmic platform. The orgasmic platform is brought about through the swelling of the bulbus vestibuli that narrows the vestibulum. It is actually the narrowing and the extending of the lower 1/3 of the sheath.
