= Olga Khazan =

American journalist and author

Olga Khazan is a Soviet-born American journalist and author known for her work on health, science, and social science topics. She is a staff writer at The Atlantic and the author of Weird: The Power of Being an Outsider in an Insider World (2020) and Me, But Better: The Science and Promise of Personality Change (2025).

== Early life and education ==
Khazan was born to a Finnish Lutheran mother and a Russian-Jewish father. She moved with her parents as a child from the Soviet Union to the United States about a year before the Soviet Union dissolved, settling in Midland, Texas. Khazan graduated from American University with a degree in Political Science. She later earned a master's degree in journalism from the University of Southern California's Annenberg School.

== Career ==
Khazan began her career as a web editor for Forbes magazine. She later worked as a freelance writer in Washington, D.C., and as the Moscow correspondent for The Washington Post.

In 2013, she joined The Atlantic as a staff writer, where she covers health, gender, and science. Her work has focused particularly on healthcare policy, psychology, and social science research. She has written extensively about mental health, workplace dynamics, and social inequality.

=== Books ===
In 2020, Khazan published her first book, Weird: The Power of Being an Outsider in an Insider World (Hachette Books). The book explores how people who feel different from their peers can leverage their outsider status to succeed. Drawing on psychological research and personal interviews, Khazan examines how feeling like an outsider can become a source of creative and professional strength.

In 2025, Khazan published her second book, Me, But Better: The Science and Promise of Personality Change (Simon & Schuster/Simon Element). In this book, Khazan conducts a year-long experiment on herself to explore whether it's possible to change one's personality, examining the science behind personality modification and presenting evidence-based techniques for self-improvement.

== Awards and recognition ==
Khazan has received several awards for her journalism, including:

- National Headliner Award for her coverage of health topics
- Association of Health Care Journalists Award for her reporting on healthcare policy
- Hurston/Wright Foundation Award for commentary

== Selected works ==
=== Articles ===
- "Why Americans Are So Afraid of Going to the Doctor" (The Atlantic, 2019)
- "The Loneliness of the Long-Distance Worker" (The Atlantic, 2021)
- "What Facebook Did to American Democracy" (The Atlantic, 2017)

=== Books ===
- Weird: The Power of Being an Outsider in an Insider World (2020)
- Me, But Better: The Science and Promise of Personality Change (2025)
