= Erotic plasticity =

Degree of external influence on the sex drive

Erotic plasticity is the degree to which one's sex drive can be changed by cultural or social factors. Someone has "high erotic plasticity" when their sex drives can be affected by situational, social and cultural influences, whereas someone with "low erotic plasticity" has a sex drive that is relatively rigid and unsusceptible to change. Since social psychologist Roy Baumeister coined the term in 2000, only two studies directly assessing erotic plasticity have been completed as of 2010.

The female erotic plasticity hypothesis states that women have higher erotic plasticity than men, and therefore their sex drives are more socially flexible and responsive than those of men (factors such as religion, culture and education have a greater effect on women's sexual behaviors). Men, on the other hand, remain relatively rigid after puberty but can still be affected by these factors.

== Female erotic plasticity hypothesis ==
As women have been theorised to possess a weaker sex drive than men, they may more readily accept substitutes or alternate forms of satisfaction. Baumeister theorized that weaker motivations tend to lead to greater plasticity. However, a lower sex drive does not necessarily imply that sex is less important for women, or that females have a lower capacity to become aroused. Rather, Baumeister's hypothesis supports the notion that women are less willing to engage in sex than their male counterparts.

=== Evidence for female erotic plasticity ===
==== Culture ====
According to Baumeister, the culture a woman is raised in affects her sexual attitudes and behaviours more than it would affect a man raised in the same culture. Factors such as politics, cultural and societal views on sexual behaviours would all play a role. A multinational study by Lippa (2009) found that women are more variable in their sex drives, suggesting that their sexuality is more malleable and influenced by society than men's. Another study showed that South Korean women had a higher median age of first intercourse, lower rates of premarital sex, and greater disapproval of premarital sex. In South Korea, there are strong gender-based sexual double standards such that women are expected to be passive and virgins at marriage. Therefore, Baumeister theorized that cultural norms have affected women's attitudes and behaviours more so than men. Another study showed that female, but not male, Hispanic immigrants to the United States were less likely to engage in vaginal, oral, and anal sex than Hispanics who had been born and raised in the United States. Condom use was unaffected by whether or not the person was an immigrant, suggesting that upbringing and acculturation had a significant impact on engaging in sexual activity and not on how they would protect themselves during sex.

Baumeister predicted that acculturation, the process of adopting the behaviour patterns and attitudes of the surrounding culture, should have a greater effect on the sexual behaviours and attitudes of female immigrants. However, in a study conducted by Benuto and Meana, one of the two studies conducted about erotic plasticity, supporting evidence was not found. When examining the acculturation of college students from an American college of non-American background, acculturation had the same effect on sexual behaviours and attitudes of both men and women. Numerous potential methodological flaws of the study are indicated that may have produced this contradictory data, such as women trying to appear socially desirable in their responses (see social desirability bias) or that participants were too acculturated.

==== Religion ====
Catholic nuns are more successful at fulfilling their vows of celibacy and more willing to commit to their promises of sexual abstinence than male clergy, suggesting women can more easily adapt to such high non-permissive standards. A study on older unmarried adults found that those who were highly religious were less likely to have recently had sex compared to non-religious unmarried adults. However, this effect was stronger in women, suggesting a stronger influence on women's sexual behaviour. Church attendance and religiosity is also associated with lower odds of reporting masturbation among females. One possible explanation is that higher levels of spirituality and religiosity are associated with higher levels of sex guilt in women. One study even suggests that this differs amongst women of different culture. Religious Euro-Canadian women reported significantly higher levels of sexual desire and less sex guilt than Eastern Asian women. This is an example of two societal pressures, religion and culture, interacting to shape sexuality. Finally, Farmer and colleagues (2009) found that unreligious women are more likely to engage in unrestricted premarital intercourse behaviour than religious women. Such a difference was not demonstrated in religious and non-religious men.

===== Adolescent sexuality =====
Religiosity can also affect whether adolescents choose to abstain from sexual conduct. Commitment to religion and having friends with similar commitments has a stronger impact on girls than boys. Other factors, such as family members' disapproval of adolescent sexual behaviour also play a significant role.

==== Heritability ====
Heritability is the amount of differences between individuals that is the product of genetics. According to female erotic plasticity theory, sexual behaviours of men should be more heritable because there is a stronger biological component driving these behaviours. A study examining adult twins in Sweden found a lower genetic component for the engagement in same-sex behaviours in women than in men. Shared environment also played a larger role in women's same-sex behaviours than in men's, although unique environmental factors were roughly the same. On the other hand, in their study of Australian twins, Bailey, Dunne and Martin found a concordance in sexual behaviour of 20% for male MZ twins, and of 24% for female MZ twins.

Another twin study showed male identical twins are more likely than female identical twins to begin having sex at the same age. Shared environment plays a greater role than genetics in risky sexual behaviours in adolescent females.

==== Attitude–behaviour inconsistencies ====
Baumeister's 3rd prediction states that women should have greater inconsistencies between their attitudes towards sexual behaviours and whether they actually engage in said behaviours. Wives are more likely than husbands to report that they changed a "great deal" in their habits, ideas and expectations of sex over 20 years of marriage. Even more husbands reported that their spouses changed than did wives. Another example is condom use, for which women in the past have demonstrated difficulty in expressing their desire to use them during sex. However, a 2008 study by Woolf and Maisto found that this trend is declining, suggesting traditional gender roles in culture may be changing.

== Gender similarities ==
Although the female erotic plasticity theory states that the men's and women's sexuality are different, some evidence suggests that men's sexuality too can be affected by sociocultural factors. Although religious commitment and family member's stances on adolescent sexual behaviours have a significant impact on females' choice to abstain, to a lesser extent it affects males' choice as well. Also, the fact that some male clergy are successful in maintaining their vows of celibacy suggests some degree of erotic plasticity. College education is associated with an increase in variety of sexual behaviours in both men and women. Asian males and females consistently report more conservative sexual attitudes than Hispanic and Euro-Americans.

== Sexual arousal ==
According to Meredith Chivers, straight women are physically aroused by a greater variety of erotic images than men, and this physical arousal does not match subjective arousal. Similar results were found in a study that showed both consensual and non-consensual sex scenes to men and women. Neither men nor women reported sexual arousal to the rape scenes, but women's bodies responded in a similar way to both scenarios. This may be because women's physical arousal, regardless of psychological arousal, is an evolutionary automatic response to prevent damage during rape.

A study that measured sexual arousal through pupil dilation found that physical response of lesbian and bisexual women to erotic images was more category-specific than that of straight women, with lesbian women showing more response to women, and bisexual women showing more response to the preferred sex than the other. This may be due to masculinization of the brain via prenatal hormones. The difference between straight and non-straight women was consistent with Chivers' findings, although straight women did show more consistency with their orientation with this measure than with the genital measure.

== Sexual fluidity and same-sex behaviours ==
Sexual fluidity is the concept that sexual orientation or sexuality is not rigid, but rather can change over time. According to Lisa Diamond, developer of the concept, women generally tend to be more fluid in their sexuality than men. In her study of lesbian, bisexual and unlabeled women, she found that these had a tendency of changing their sexual identities and behaviour over time. Other studies have shown as well greater fluidity among lesbians, compared with homosexual men. However, heterosexual men and women were equally stable in their orientation, and bisexual men and women were similarly unstable.

Often, sexual orientation and sexual orientation identity are not distinguished, which can impact accurately assessing sexual identity and whether or not sexual orientation is able to change; sexual orientation identity can change throughout an individual's life, and may or may not align with biological sex, sexual behavior or actual sexual orientation. Sexual orientation is stable and unlikely to change for the vast majority of people, but some research indicates that some people may experience change in their sexual orientation, and this is more likely for women than for men. The American Psychological Association distinguishes between sexual orientation (an innate attraction) and sexual orientation identity (which may change at any point in a person's life).

Women who remained in relationships with male-to-female transsexuals maintained a heterosexual identity, yet reported changes in their sexual lives. (Aramburu Alegría, 2012) Some women reported that their relationships no longer included sexual activity, while others reported that things were still changing. According to Lippa (2006), heterosexual women with high sex drives tend to be attracted to both women and men, whereas heterosexual men with high sex drives are only associated with attraction to either women or men, suggesting greater plasticity in women's sexuality.

== Erotic plasticity and gender/sexual variation ==
Lesbians are more likely than gay men to engage in heterosexual sex, suggesting greater variability in their sexuality. No research has been done on people with gender variation, such as transgender people.

Little is known about erotic plasticity in transsexuals. Sexual reassignment surgery and hormone therapy (i.e. testosterone) in female-to-male transsexuals produce an increase in their sexual desire, but it is uncertain how erotic plasticity plays a role. Heterosexual female-to-male transsexuals – those who are sexually attracted to women – have more sexual partners than nonheterosexual female-to-male transsexuals, but again, erotic plasticity's role in this - if one actually exists - is uncertain.

== Erotic Plasticity Questionnaire ==
In her Ph.D. dissertation in 2009, Lorraine Benuto attempted to create a scale measuring erotic plasticity. Her scale, the EPQ (Erotic Plasticity Questionnaire), contained the following subscales, each believed to be a component of erotic plasticity:

- Fluidity (of behaviours on the same-sex/opposite-sex continuum)
- Attitude-Behaviour Inconsistency
- Changes in Attitudes (over time)
- Perception of Choice
- Sociocultural Influence

When administered to a test population, women scored higher on fluidity, attitude-behaviour inconsistency, and overall erotic plasticity. There were no significant gender differences in changes in attitudes, perception of choice and sociocultural influences. The test also did not demonstrate any relationship between erotic plasticity and locus of control, sexual liberality and openness. Benuto also did not find a negative correlation between sex drive and EPQ score, which is unexpected. This is either because of a methodological problem in the scale or a problem in Baumeister's hypothesis that plasticity is related to sex drive. Furthermore, the subscales of the EPQ did not correlate well with each other, leading Benuto to hypothesize that perhaps there is not just one type of plasticity, but plasticities, and erotic plasticity is a much more complicated construct than initially imagined.

Contrary to the numerous studies Baumeister cites as evidence of sociocultural influences on women, Benuto did not find a gender difference on the sociocultural influence subscale. However, Baumeister's cited studies were not self-report studies, whereas Benuto's scale was, which may have contributed to the discrepancy.

== Applications in sex therapy ==
Baumeister provided three applications of the theory of erotic plasticity in sex therapy. Sex differences in erotic plasticity can change how therapists will approach providing sex therapy to men and women. Baumeister found that cognitive therapy would be a better approach for female patients because sexual responses and behaviours are influenced by what things mean, therefore working with women's interpretations and understanding of these responses and behaviours would be of greatest benefit. Physiological therapy, such as hormone therapy, would therefore be best for male patients, since the focus would be more on the body than on the man's cognitions. Also, someone with high erotic plasticity will have less sexual self-knowledge and self-understanding than someone with low erotic plasticity since their behaviours and tastes are susceptible to change; this knowledge could be useful in helping someone perhaps confused about his or her sexual identity. Finally, prospects for successful sex therapy may be better for women than men, because if men develop a problem, their low plasticity will make it difficult to allow significant change after puberty.

Other useful applications of erotic plasticity in sex therapy include having women place much consideration in family and peer relationships, and any internal and external pressures that may be affecting their sexual identity, such as religious influences, cultural norms and politics.

== Criticism and alternate explanations ==
Baumeister's theory of female erotic plasticity has been met with some criticism. Some argue Baumeister makes causal inferences from correlational research when discussing how education affects men and women differently. He was also criticized for his use of extreme groups to support his predictions, such as people of the least and most education. Below are two posited alternate explanations of erotic plasticity:

=== Shibley Hyde and Durik ===
In a 2000 paper, Janet Shibley Hyde and Amanda M. Durik argued that a more sociocultural explanation could be used to explain erotic plasticity. Firstly, education does not affect men's and women's sexual behaviour differently. Instead, it increases women's power, therefore women with the greatest amount of education are nearly equal in power with men. On the other hand, women who are the least educated have the least power relative to men. When comparing sexual behaviours of most educated and least educated men and women, they found that education actually increased the prevalence of many sexual activities in both sexes, including oral sex, anal sex, and having a same sex partner. The differences between men and women were much smaller in the most educated group than in the least educated group. Shibley Hyde and Durik speculate that more educated women are better at communicating their desires and have enough self-confidence to do so. They also may perform a greater variety of sexual activities because of their greater exposure to ideas and their commitment to learning.

Shibley Hyde and Durik also asserted that religion has a greater effect on women's sexual behaviours because a group with less power – in this case, women – will shape their behaviour to be more like the group with power, in this case, men. Therefore, women pay more attention to and conform more to religious teachings since it is the culture to which they must adapt. They back up this claim by presenting evidence that non-religious women and men are similar in the prevalence of all sexual activities, minus masturbation. On the contrary, Conservative Protestant men and women differed significantly in all sexual behaviours.

They also argued for a modern sexual double standard that is more restrictive of female sexuality than male sexuality. They claimed that now, extramarital sex is more tolerated in women than in the past, but it is still less acceptable in women than in men. Therefore, these different gender roles will exert powerful influences on both men's and women's behaviour and sexuality. Finally, they claim that the greater evidence for attitude-behaviour inconsistency in women is not the result of high erotic plasticity, but because of men's greater interpersonal power. Although women may, for example, have the intention of using condoms or have negative attitudes towards anal sex, men may use their greater power to do what it is they desire if it differs from what their partner wants.

=== Benuto ===
Benuto (2009) argues that heightened fluidity and sociocultural influences, two components of erotic plasticity, actually stand in opposition to each other. Although scientific evidence exists that women's sexual behaviours are indeed more fluid than men's, Benuto argues there is nothing in society that would encourage women to engage in same-sex behaviour. She hypothesizes that, based on the properties of her EPQ scale (Benuto, 2009), erotic plasticity may not be a unitary construct like Baumeister initially proposed, and that there perhaps may be multiple "plasticities", each composed of different constructs. Such constructs include sociocultural influences, locus of control and changes of sexual attitudes over time. Finally, it is possible that the heightened attitude-behaviour inconsistency in women could either be due to the powerlessness of women, or women wanting to maintain harmony and nurturance in their relationship.

== See also ==
- Environment and sexual orientation
- Lovemap
