= Meredith Chivers =

Canadian sexologist

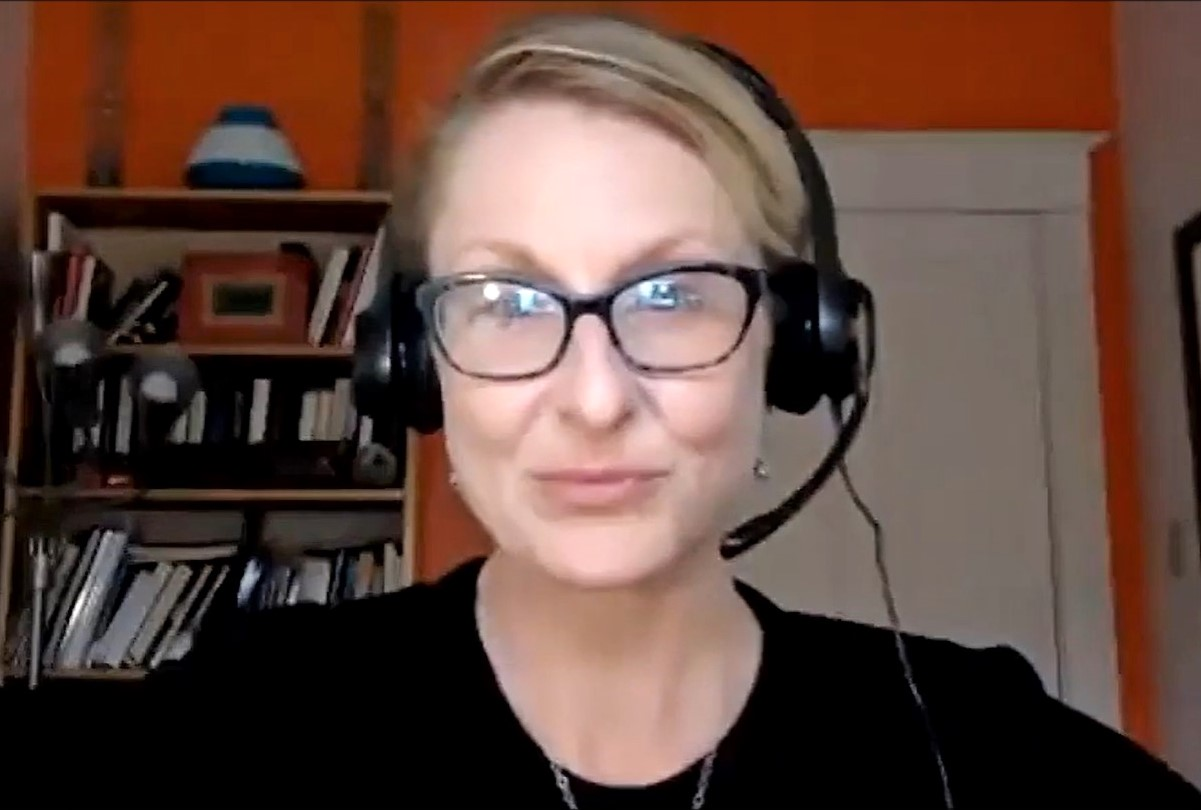
- Chivers in 2022
- Education: University of Guelph (BSc hon), Northwestern University (PhD)
- Known for: Female sexuality
- Scientific career
- Fields: Sexology, Psychology
- Workplaces: Queen’s University
- Website: Sage Laboratory, Queen's University

Meredith L. Chivers is a Canadian sexologist and clinical psychologist noted for her research on female sexuality, sexual orientation, paraphilias, sex differences, gender identity, and the physiology of sexual arousal. She is an associate professor in the Department of Psychology at Queen's University in Kingston, Ontario, Canada.

== Education and career ==
Chivers attended the University of Guelph for her undergraduate agree. In 2003, she earned her Ph.D. in clinical psychology from Northwestern University. She has been a faculty member at Queen's University since 2009, where she is director of the Sexuality and Gender Lab.

In 2019, Chivers was appointed as a Fellow of the Society for the Scientific Study of Sexuality, an honour given to two individuals each year.

== Research ==
Chivers's research interests include sexual attractions, sexual response, sexual functioning, and the psychophysiology of sexual arousal.

In one line of research, Chivers measured biological and sexual responses of men and women to different types of pornography to analyze human sexual response patterns. By testing both heterosexual and homosexual men and women, Chivers found that men (both heterosexual and gay) respond with "category specificity" whereas women (heterosexual and lesbian) respond more broadly. In 2005, Chivers co-authored a study of bisexual men, in which the men's responses to heterosexual and homosexual photos were shown. Despite that the men reported being bisexual, most of them showed a substantially stronger response either one of the two sexes instead of roughly equal responses to both.

After reports that women respond with vaginal lubrication even to stimuli depicting rape, Chivers hypothesized that the lubrication might not relate only to female sexual desire, that it is also a separate system, an evolutionary adaptive one, that protect females from damage in sexual violence.

== Selected works ==
- Seto, M. C., Lalumière, M. L., Harris, G. T., & Chivers, M. L. (2012). The sexual responses of sexual sadists. Journal of Abnormal Psychology, 121, 739–753. doi:10.1037/a0028714.
- Chivers, M. L., Pittini, R., Villegas, L., Grigoriadis, S., Ross, L. E. (2011). The relationship between sexual function and depressive symptomatology in postpartum women: A pilot study. Journal of Sexual Medicine, 8, 792–799. doi:10.1111/j.1743-6109.2010.02154.x.
- Chivers, M. L. (2010). A brief update on the specificity of sexual arousal. Sexual and Relationship Therapy, 25, 407–414. doi:10.1080/14681994.2010.495979.
- Salonia, A., Giraldi, A., Chivers, M. L., Georgiadis, J., Levin, R., Maravilla, K., & McCarthy, M. (2010). Physiology of women's sexual function: Basic knowledge and new findings. Journal of Sexual Medicine, 7, 2637–2660. doi:10.1111/j.1743-6109.2010.01810.x.
- Chivers, M. L., & Rosen. R. (2010). PDE-5 Inhibitors and female sexual response: Faulty protocols or paradigms? Journal of Sexual Medicine, 7, 858–872. ISSN 1743-6109.
- Chivers, M. L., Seto, M. C., Lalumière, M. L, Laan, E., & Grimbos, T. (2010). Agreement of genital and subjective measures of sexual arousal in men and women: A meta-analysis. Archives of Sexual Behavior, 39, 5–56. ISSN 1573-2800.
- Chivers, M. L., Seto, M. C., & Blanchard, R. (2007). Gender and sexual orientation differences in sexual response to the sexual activities versus the gender of actors in sexual films. Journal of Personality and Social Psychology, 93, 1108–1121. ISSN 0022-3514.
- Chivers, M. L., & Bailey, J. M. (2005). A sex difference in features that elicit genital response. Biological Psychology, 70, 115–120. ISSN 0301-0511.
- Rieger, G., Chivers, M. L., & Bailey, J. M. (2005). Sexual arousal patterns of bisexual men. Psychological Science, 16, 579–584. ISSN 0956-7976.
- Lawrence, A., Latty, E., Chivers, M. L., & Bailey, J. M. (2005). Measurement of sexual arousal in postoperative male-to-female transsexuals using vaginal photoplethysmography. Archives of Sexual Behavior, 34, 135–145. ISSN 0004-0002.
- Chivers, M. L., Rieger, G., Latty, E., & Bailey, J. M. (2004). A sex difference in the specificity of sexual arousal. Psychological Science, 15, 736–744. ISSN 0956-7976.
- Chivers, M. L., & Blanchard, R. (1996). Prostitution advertisements suggest association of transvestism and masochism. Journal of Sex & Marital Therapy, 22, 97–102. ISSN 0092-623X.

== Other sources ==
- Birds Do It. Bees Do It. People Seek the Keys to It. (2007, April 10). The New York Times.
- Bryner, M. (2005, July/August). For women, a world of turn-ons. Psychology Today, 38, p. 26. Yeoman, B. (2004, August). Forbidden Science. Discover Magazine, 25.
- In sex, brain studies show, 'la Différence' still holds. (2004, March 16). The New York Times. Lemonick, M. D. (2004, Jan. 19). Chemistry of desire. Time Magazine, 163, 69–73.
- Complex picture of female sexuality hinders magic pill. (2003, Aug. 30). The Boston Globe.
- Benson, E. (2003, April). Study finds sex differences in relationship between arousal and orientation. APA Monitor, 34, p. 51.
- The Charlie Rose Show (aired March 27, 2009)
- The Agenda with Steve Paikin (aired April 22, 2009)
