= La petite mort =

Phrase

La petite mort (French pronunciation: [la pətit mɔʁ]; lit. 'the little death') is an expression that refers to a brief loss or weakening of consciousness and in modern usage refers specifically to a post-orgasm sensation as likened to death.

The first attested use of the expression in English was in 1572 with the meaning of "fainting fit." It later came to mean "nervous spasm" as well. The first attested use with the meaning of "orgasm" was in 1882. In modern usage, this term has generally been interpreted to describe the state of unconsciousness felt during an orgasm that certain people perceive during the sexual experiences.

The term la petite mort does not always apply to sexual experiences. It can also be used when some undesired thing has happened to a person and has affected them so much that "a part of them dies inside." A literary example of this is found in Thomas Hardy's Tess of the D'Urbervilles when he uses the phrase to describe how Tess feels after she comes across a particularly gruesome omen after meeting with her own rapist:

She felt the petite mort at this unexpectedly gruesome information, and left the solitary man behind her.

The term little death, a direct translation of la petite mort, can also be used in English to essentially the same effect. Specifically, it is defined as "a state or event resembling or prefiguring death; a weakening or loss of consciousness, specifically in sleep or during an orgasm," a nearly identical definition to that of the original French. As with la petite mort, the earlier attested uses are not related to sex or orgasm.

== See also ==
- Georges Bataille
- Dhat syndrome
- Post-coital tristesse
- Postorgasmic illness syndrome
- Refractory period
- Sexual headache
