= Dhat syndrome =

Culture-bound medical condition

- Specialty: Psychiatry

Dhat syndrome (Sanskrit: धातु दोष, IAST: Dhātu doṣa) is a psychiatric condition found in the cultures of South Asia (including Pakistan, India, Bangladesh, Nepal, and Sri Lanka) in which male patients report premature ejaculation or impotence, and believe that they are passing semen in their urine. The condition has no known organic cause.

In traditional Hindu spirituality, semen is described as a "vital fluid". The discharge of this "vital fluid", either through sex or masturbation, is associated with marked feelings of anxiety and dysphoria. Often the patient describes the loss of a whitish fluid while passing urine. At other times, marked feelings of guilt associated with what the patient assumes is "excessive" masturbation are noted.

Many doctors view dhat as a folk diagnostic term used in South Asia to refer to anxiety and hypochondriacal concerns associated with the discharge of semen, with discoloration of the urine, and feelings of weakness and exhaustion.

Dhat is thought to be a culture-bound syndrome similar to jiryan (South-East Asia), prameha (Sri Lanka), and shenkui (China). Dhat syndrome might be related to other post-orgasmic diseases, such as post-coital tristesse (PCT), postorgasmic illness syndrome (POIS), and sexual headache.

== Signs and symptoms ==
Young males are most often affected, though similar symptoms have been reported in females with excessive vaginal discharge or leucorrhea, which is also considered a "vital fluid". In addition, there are symptoms of fatigue and weakness. Patients with Dhat condition most normally ascribe their semen misfortune (secretion of semen in urine) to reasons like inordinate masturbation, sensual dreams, and unreasonable sexual longing. Nocturnal emission and secretion of semen in urine are considered to be the most widely recognized symptoms of semen misfortune. Patients with Dhat condition frequently dread the result of semen misfortune and regularly have the conviction that it will lead to decrease in sexual performance. The most widely recognized side effects in patients with Dhat condition are shortcoming of the body, sluggishness, low energy, and low temperament. Premature ejaculation and impotence are commonly seen. Other somatic symptoms like weakness, easy fatiguability, palpitations, insomnia, low mood, guilt and anxiety are often present. Males sometimes report a subjective feeling that their penises have shortened. These symptoms are usually associated with an anxious and dysphoric mood state. Another sign of this syndrome is white discharge. According to Ayurveda, an Indian medical system, men who have experienced this have shown signs of anxiety issues. This disease is a culture bound syndrome. Semen loss is generally viewed as taboo and harmful. It is also associated with a lower socioeconomic class. Being able to produce semen is viewed as longevity of one's health and certain powers. In Indian culture, it is important for a man to produce semen.

== Treatment ==
Cognitive behavioral therapy is the mainstay of treatment. At other times counseling, anti-anxiety and antidepressant medications have been shown to be of use. Doctors have found that antidepressant medicines have shown positive results in controlling the Dhat syndrome's psychological causes."

== Epidemiology ==
Dhat syndrome has been reported throughout South Asia in several communities."

== History ==
Both in Asian and Western contexts, ethnomedical concerns for physical ailments tied to semen loss were gradually joined and moderated by ethnopsychiatric notions of semen loss anxiety. European proto-psychiatric interests in anxiety tied to spermatorrhea go back to the eighteenth century.

The term Dhat gets its origin from the Sanskrit word Dhatu (धातु), which, according to the Sushruta Samhita, means "elixir that constitutes the body". Indian doctor N. N. Wig coined the term Dhat syndrome in 1960, and described it as being characterized by vague psychosomatic symptoms of fatigue, weakness, anxiety, loss of appetite, guilt, and sexual dysfunction, attributed by the patient to loss of semen in nocturnal emission, through urine or masturbation. Literature describing semen as a vital constituent of the human body dates back to 1500 BC. The disorders of Dhatus have been elucidated in the Charaka Samhita, which describes a disorder called Shukrameha (शुक्रमेह) in which there is a passage of semen in the urine. In China, various names such as (Shen K'uei), Sri Lanka (Prameha) and other parts of South East Asia (Jiryan) symptoms and conditions are similar to dhatus. The International Classification of diseases ICD-10 classifies Dhat syndrome as both a neurotic disorder (code F48.8) and a culture-specific disorder (Annexe 2) caused by "undue concern about the debilitating effects of the passage of semen".

== Society and culture ==
Some doctors believe Dhat syndrome to be either a culture-bound presentation of clinical depression, as a somatized set of symptoms, or a result of Western doctors' misinterpretation of patients' descriptions of their condition.

Dhat syndrome is very common in Nepali culture as well. Most of them come with the complaints of "drops" and become extremely anxious about it and see it as loss of "male power". It is often related with obsessive ruminations and somatoform symptoms. According to Sumathipala et al., it is likely a distinct clinical entity which is less culture-bound than these critics assert. They describe it as one form of a syndrome of "semen-loss anxiety" which also occurs in other Eastern cultures as jiryan and shen-k'uei, as well as in Western cultures.

Chlamydia infection might also be related to it because of similar symptoms in case of infection of the urethra (urethritis), which is usually symptomatic, causing a white discharge from the penis with or without pain on urinating (dysuria).

== See also ==
- Cross-cultural psychiatry
- Koro
- Shenkui
- NoFap
