= Koro (disease) =

Genital-related neurosis

- Other names: Genital retraction syndrome, shrinking penis
- Specialty: Psychiatry

Koro is a culture-bound delusional disorder in which individuals have an overpowering belief that their sex organs are retracting and will disappear, despite the lack of any true longstanding changes to the genitals. Koro is also known as shrinking penis, and was listed in the Diagnostic and Statistical Manual of Mental Disorders.

The syndrome occurs worldwide, and mass hysteria of genital-shrinkage anxiety has a history in Africa, Asia and Europe. In the United States and Europe, the syndrome is commonly known as genital retraction syndrome.

The condition can be diagnosed through psychological assessment, along with physical examination to rule out genuine disorders of the genitalia that could be causing true retraction.

The word was borrowed from Malay and means the head of a turtle (or tortoise), referring to how it looks when they retract their heads into their shells.

== Signs and symptoms ==
Most patients report acute anxiety attacks due to perceived genital retraction and/or genital shrinkage, despite a lack of any objectively visible biological changes in the genitalia that are longstanding. "Longstanding" refers to changes that are sustained over a significant period of time and do not appear reversible, unlike the effect of cold temperatures on some genital regions that cause retraction. These changes may trigger a koro attack when observed, although the effects of cold temperatures are objectively reversible.

According to literature, episodes usually last several hours, though the duration may be as long as two days. There are cases in which koro symptoms persist for years in a chronic state, indicating a potential co-morbidity with body dysmorphic disorder. In addition to retraction, other symptoms include a perception of alteration of penis shape and loss of penile muscle tone. In cases when patients have no perception of retraction, some patients may complain of genital paraesthesia or genital shortening. Among females, the cardinal symptom is nipple retraction in the breast, generally into the breast as a whole.

Psychological components of koro anxiety include fear of impending death, penile dissolution and loss of sexual power. Feelings of impending death along with retraction and perceived spermatorrhea has a strong cultural link with Chinese traditional beliefs. This is demonstrated by the fact that Asians generally believe koro symptoms are fatal, unlike most patients in the West. Other ideational themes are intra-abdominal organ shrinkage, sex-change to female or eunuch, non-specific physical danger, urinary obstruction, sterility, impending madness, spirit possession and a feeling of being bewitched.

Individuals with extreme anxiety and their family members may resort to physical methods to prevent the believed retraction of the penis. A man may perform manual or mechanical penile traction, or "anchoring" by a loop of string or some clamping device. Similarly, a woman may be seen grabbing her own breast, pulling her nipple, or even having iron pins inserted into the nipple. Physical injury may occur from these attempts. These forceful attempts often lead to injuries, sometimes death.

== Causes ==
Psychosexual conflicts, personality factors, and cultural beliefs are considered as being of etiological significance to koro. Sexual adjustment histories of non-Chinese individuals are often significant, such as premorbid sex inadequacy, sexual promiscuity, guilt over masturbation, and impotence.

== Diagnosis ==
Several criteria are typically used to make a diagnosis of koro. The primary criterion is a patient's report of genital (typically penile or female nipple) retraction despite a lack of objective physical evidence demonstrating retraction. This is accompanied by severe anxiety related to the retraction, fear of death as a result of retraction, and use of mechanical means to prevent retraction. Cases that do not meet all the requirements are generally classified as koro-like symptoms or given a diagnosis of partial koro syndrome. It has been argued that the criteria are sufficient but not necessary to make a diagnosis of koro. Researchers have identified koro as a possible "cultural relative" of body dysmorphic disorder. DSM-IV explains the process of differential diagnosis between these two disorders.

=== History and physical examination ===
A medical, psychosexual and psychiatric history should be documented. The physician should explore the patient's concerns about appearance and body image (ruling out body dysmorphic disorder). Additionally, the physician should inquire about overall beliefs, personal values, and assumptions that the patient is making about his or her genitals. Given that koro is often an “attack” with a great deal of associated anxiety, the physician should ascertain the patient's emotional state along with the timeline from onset to the presentation at the examination.

A physical examination should involve an assessment of overall health along with a detailed genital examination. In men, genital examination should be performed immediately after penile exposure, to avoid changes due to external temperature. The primary intent of the male exam is to exclude genuine penile anomalies such as hypospadias, epispadias and Peyronie's disease. The presence of a significant suprapubic fat pad should be noted as well. Careful measurements of flaccid length, stretched length and flaccid girth will also be useful. If male patients insist that their penis is shrinking and disappearing, measurements after intracavernosal alprostadil may be used in the office to determine the true erect length and to diagnose any penile abnormalities in the erect state. A physical examination should note any injuries inflicted by the patient in an effort to "prevent" retraction as further confirmation of koro.

=== Classification ===
In DSM-IV-TR, koro is listed as one of the entries in the Glossary of Culture-Bound Syndromes of Appendix I. The manual gives koro's definition as "a term, probably of Malaysian origin, that refers to an episode of sudden and intense anxiety that the penis (or, in females, the vulva and nipples) will recede into the body and possibly cause death." Attempts have been made by numerous authors to place koro into different classes. For example, koro may fit into the group of "specific culture-imposed nosophobia" (classification with cardinal sign), "the genital retraction taxon" (classification with common factors between syndromes), and the group with "culture-related beliefs as causes for the occurrence" (classification according to how the syndromes might be affected by cultural factors).

Various authors have attempted to distinguish between complete and incomplete forms of koro, along with cultural and non-cultural forms. Cultural forms are said to involve a cultural belief or myth which plays a role in the genesis and spread of the disease in the community. These are regarded as complete forms of koro, matching all the symptoms required for diagnosis without significant co-morbidity. Differentiation into primary koro, a culture-bound expression, and secondary koro. Secondary koro is proposed to have co-morbidity with a CNS disorder, another psychiatric disorder, or possible drug use.

Traditional Chinese medicine recognises koro as a sexual disease and classifies it into two categories, namely "cold conglomeration in liver" and "depletion of kidney's yang".

=== Differential diagnosis ===
Men who present with this complaint may have koro, but they may also be misinformed about normal genital size. Additionally, they may have penile dysmorphophobia. Penile dysmorphophobia is related to body dysmorphic disorder (BDD), defined by the Diagnostic and Statistical Manual of Mental Disorders-Fourth Edition (Text Revision) (DSM-IV-TR) as a condition marked by excessive preoccupation with an imaginary or minor defect in a facial feature or localized part of the body. BDD is different from koro. In koro, a patient is overcome with the belief that his penis is actively shrinking, and it may be in imminent danger of disappearing. Clinical literature indicates that these two psychological conditions should be separated during differential diagnosis.

In addition to differentiating koro from body dysmorphic disorder, physicians also recommend that differential diagnosis separates koro from physical urological abnormalities. For example, one physical disorder that causes loss of penile size is Peyronie's disease, where the tunica albuginea develops scar tissue that prevents the full expansion of an erection and causes flaccid penis retraction. Additionally, a buried penis is a normally developed penis, partially covered by the suprapubic fat which can be surgically removed.

== Treatment ==
In historical culture-bound cases, reassurance and talks on sexual anatomy are given. Patients are treated with psychotherapy distributed according to symptoms and to etiologically significant points in the past. Prognosis appears to be better in cases with a previously functional personality, a short history and low frequency of attacks, and a relatively uncomplicated sexual life.

For sporadic Western cases, careful diagnostic workup including searching for underlying sexual conflict is common. The choice of psychotherapeutic treatment is based on the psychiatric pathology found.

=== Indigenous treatment ===
In China, traditional treatment based on the causes suggested by cultural beliefs are administered to the patient. Praying to gods and asking Taoist priests to perform exorcism is common. If a fox spirit is believed to be involved, people may hit gongs or beat the person to drive it out. The person will receive a yang- or yin-augmenting Chinese medicine to try to balance the internal conditions, usually including herbs, pilose antler (stag of deer) or deer tail, and tiger penis, deer penis, or fur seal penis. Other medicinal foods for therapy are pepper soup, ginger soup and liquor.

== Epidemiology ==
Among the Chinese, koro is confined to South China and the lower Yangtze Valley. A 1992 study of self-report questionnaires suggests that in the epidemic area of China, individuals with koro are mostly Han, male, young, single, poorly educated and fearful of supernatural forces and koro.

The phenomenon is also found among overseas Chinese in Southeast Asia, especially Malaysia and Indonesia, and less frequently among the Malay and Indonesian inhabitants of the countries. Though there are speculations that the occurrence of koro among people in Malaysia and Indonesia was the result of Chinese migrants, this cultural diffusion view is challenged since koro epidemics have been reported in Thailand and India, involving masses of non-Chinese people.

Sporadic cases of koro among people with non-Southeast-Asian ethnicity have been reported across the globe, for example, Nepali, Sudanese, Jordanian, Tanzanian, Nigerian, French, British, American and Canadian. In most of the non-Chinese cases in the Western Hemisphere, fear of genital shrinkage is reported but not all the other typical koro symptoms, such as fear of death, as in endemic countries. The incomplete forms of koro are regarded as the non-cultural forms, while the complete form with acute anxiety is the classical culture-bound type.

=== China ===
Local official records indicate genital retraction epidemics in Hainan Island and Leizhou Peninsula in Guangdong, China, as early as the late nineteenth century. There were a series of epidemic outbursts in 1948, 1955, 1966, and 1974, whenever there was social tension or impending disaster, followed by the last widespread episode in 1984–1985 and a much smaller outbreak in 1987. The 1984–1985 epidemics lasted for over a year and affected over 3,000 people in 16 cities and provinces. A mental health campaign was conducted for the epidemic and since then no further episodes of the epidemic has occurred in China. Improvement in local economic conditions, associated with a better quality of life, is suggested to contribute to the fading of the episodic occurrences of koro.

=== Southeast Asia ===
A koro epidemic struck Singapore in late October 1967 for about ten days. Newspapers initially reported that some people developed koro after eating the meat of pigs inoculated with a vaccine for swine influenza. Rumours relating eating pork and koro spread after a further report of an inoculated pig dying from penile retraction. The cases reported amounted to 97 in a single hospital unit within one day, at five days after the original news report. Government and medical officials alleviated the outbreak only by public announcements over television and in the newspapers.

An epidemic outbreak in November 1976 in Isan, Thailand caused at least 350 cases, most of them Thai and males. Popular opinion and news media echoed the affected individuals' projection of viewing the epidemic as caused by Vietnamese food and tobacco poisoning in a hideous assault against the Thai people. Another large-scale epidemic in Thailand occurred in 1982.

=== India ===
In 1982, a koro epidemic episode in Northeast India affected, in majority, poorly educated people from lower socio-economic strata. There was no evidence of significant premorbid or sexual psychopathology in most cases.

Mass Koro epidemic was reported in Labour Camps in Kochi, Kerala in South India during August and September 2010 among migrant labour population from North and North-east India. Reportedly, the epidemic spread to about 100 individuals in 3 labour Camps within 2 weeks.

Mass Koro epidemic was reported in the state of West Bengal, India from July to December 2010, in the districts near southern part of India-Bangladesh border, affecting hundreds of people. It is called Disco Rog (Bengali: ডিস্কো রোগ) meaning weird disease or Jhinjhinani Rog (Bengali: ঝিনঝিনানি রোগ) meaning tingling disease, in that region. Locals created some folk managements for this condition like partly submerging the patient in a pond and pulling and holding her nipples or his genital. It is reported and published in many newspapers like Anandabazar Patrika at that time.

=== Africa ===
In the 1970s and early 1980s, newspapers reported incidents of genital shrinking in Western Nigeria. Since late 1996, a small-scale epidemic of genital shrinking was reported in West African nations. Affected individuals in the African outbreaks often interpreted the experience as genital theft, accusing someone with whom they had contact of "stealing" the organ and the spiritual essence, causing impotence. The perceived motive for theft was associated with local occult belief, the witchcraft of juju, to feed the spiritual agency or to hold the genital for ransom. Social representations about juju constitute consensual realities that propose both a means and motivation for genital-shrinking experience.

The epidemic began in Nigeria and Cameroon, and spread to Ghana, Ivory Coast and Senegal by 1997. Cases were reported in Cotonou, Benin where mobs attacked individuals accused of the penis theft and authorities ordered security forces to curb the violence, following the deaths of five people by vigilantes. Later reports of outbreak suggest a spread beyond West Africa, including the coverage of episodes in Khartoum, Sudan in September 2003; Banjul, Gambia in October 2003; and Kinshasa, DR Congo in 2008.

Comparing West African genital-shrinking epidemics with koro in Southeast Asia, the latter has symptoms centered on genital retraction (instead of shrinkage) and fear of death (which is absent in African cases). A study analyzing the West African epidemics from 1997 to 2003 concluded that rather than psychopathology, the episodes were the product of normal psychological functioning in undisturbed individuals, who were influenced by the local cultural models or social representations.

In 2025, rumors spread in the Central African Republic and Mali that certain people were stealing the penises of men who shook hands with them. A Russian-linked disinformation website attempted to capitalize on these beliefs by claiming that French intelligence services were using handshakes to steal African penises, then shipping the organs to France by boat in order to combat decreasing fertility rates in Europe. This claim was part of an ongoing effort by Russia to supplant French and Western influence in Africa.

=== US and Europe ===
In the late Middle Ages in Europe, it was believed that men could lose their penises through magical attacks by witches. The Malleus Maleficarum, a fifteenth-century European manual for witchcraft investigations, relates stories of men claiming that their genitals had disappeared, being "hidden by the devil … so that they can be neither seen nor felt." They were said to have reappeared after the men had appeased the witches responsible. Witches were said to store the removed genitals in birds' nests or in boxes, where "they move themselves like living members and eat oats and corn".

At least three publications of the 1880s, from the US, Russia and England, reported genital retraction pathology, without using the Malay or Chinese term. Koro epidemics in China were first noticed in a French report in 1908 and descriptions of koro entered clinical books of western medicine in 1936. In the 1950s, koro is noted in nosological and diagnostic psychiatry.

== Society and culture ==
=== Chinese cultural beliefs ===
Most of the ancient literature concerning koro was related to Chinese ethnic groups. For example, koro (in its Chinese term of shuk yang, shook yong or suo yang (simplified Chinese: 缩阳; traditional Chinese: 縮陽)) is documented in the old medical book New Collection of remedies of value (simplified Chinese: 验方新篇; traditional Chinese: 驗方新篇) which was published in Qing Dynasty. The book described the condition as "yin type of cold qi invasion" (simplified Chinese: 阴症伤寒; traditional Chinese: 陰症傷寒) which involved a sudden seizure during sexual intercourse with the penis retracting into the abdomen. It asserts that the patient will die if not treated with "heaty" drugs in time.

Factors of cultural expectation in the genesis of koro can be built upon ideas of sex physiology in the traditional Chinese medicine, with free play of imagination which links fatality with genital retraction.

In the ancient Chinese medical book Zhong Zang Jing (simplified Chinese: 中藏经; traditional Chinese: 中藏經), retraction of the penis with distension of the abdomen was described as a certain sign of death. The yin and yang theory proposes that an unbalanced loss of the yang humour produces genital shrinkage.

In Taoism and traditional Chinese medicine, frequent ejaculation is regarded as detrimental to health, as semen is considered to be related to a man's vital energy, and hence excessive depletion of semen may lead to illness or death. Some authors believe that the idea of death caused by the semen depletion resembles the idea of death caused by genital disappearance, although such linkage between koro and Taoism, which influences Chinese medicine to some degree, is only speculative.

The popularity of Chinese folklore also plays a role. The classic anthology of supernatural tales, Strange Stories from a Chinese Studio, describes a fox spirit which can make people weak physically and sexually and shrink their tissues. Belief in koro being caused by the fox ghost among the southern Chinese has been reported.

=== Etymology and geographical background ===
The earliest Western reference to the term koro ("koro-koro") is found in a letter from Celebes (now Sulawesi) by Carl Wilhelm Maurus Schmidtmüller, published in 1849. The name could be derived from a river, its surrounding valley, and a local tribe of the same name which is located at northwestern sector of Sulawesi, Indonesia. The word is also used in Makassarese language, meaning "to shrink"; the full expression is garring koro. Koro may also be derived from Malay term Kura which means "head of turtle" or keruk which means "to shrink". The term shuk yang (缩阳), adapted from Chinese, means "the shrinkage of penis". The term koro is also known as rok loo (genital shrinkage disease) in Thailand, jinjinnia bemar in Assam, India, and lanuk e laso by the Bogoba tribe in Philippines.

== See also ==
- Body dysmorphic disorder
- Castration anxiety
- Culture-bound syndrome
- Diagnostic and Statistical Manual of Mental Disorders
- Hard flaccid syndrome, a dysfunction of the pelvic floor that causes constant "turtling"
- Mental health in China
- Penile dysmorphic disorder
- Shenkui, a similar Chinese culture-bound syndrome
- Traditional Chinese Medicine
- Dhat syndrome
- NoFap
