= Claude François Lallemand =

French physician (1790–1854)

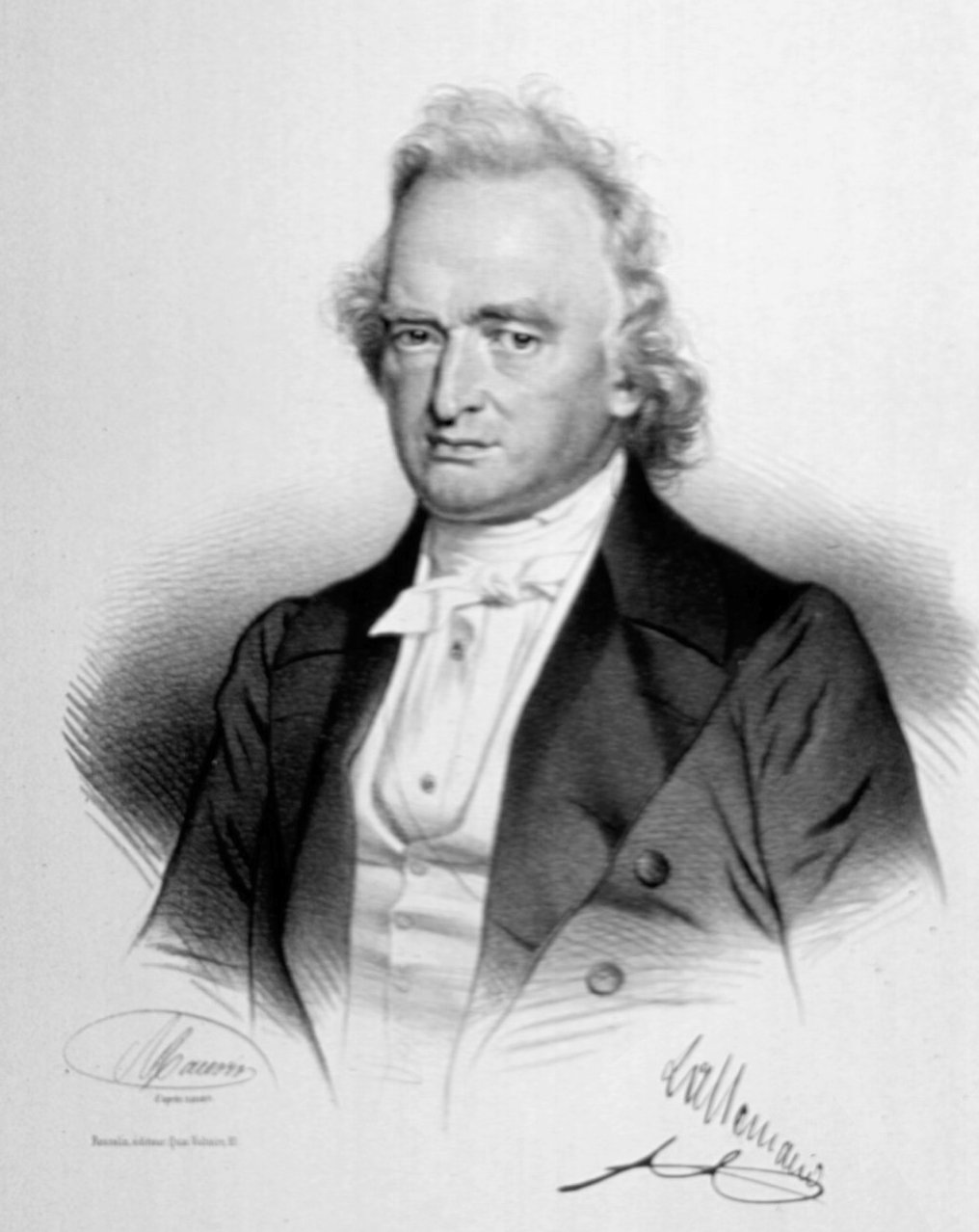
- Born: 26 January 1790; Metz, France
- Died: 25 August 1854 (aged 64); Marseille, France
- Education: Hôtel-Dieu, Paris,
- Known for: Recherches anatomico-pathologiques sur l'encéphale et ses dépendances, Spermatorrhea
- Awards: Elected to the French Academy of Sciences
- Scientific career
- Fields: Medicine
- Workplaces: University of Montpellier
- Academic advisors: Guillaume Dupuytren

Claude François Lallemand (26 January 1790, Metz – 25 August 1854, Marseille) was a French medical doctor.

== Career ==
After serving as assistant surgeon in the armies of the Empire, he studied in Paris at the Hotel Dieu under Guillaume Dupuytren, and, from 1819 to 1845, was Professor of Clinical Surgery at Montpellier, with the exception of three years, during which he was suspended for his liberal political expressions. In 1832 he succeeded Jacques Mathieu Delpech (1777–1832) as doyen (dean) of surgery in Montpellier.

His most important work, Recherches anatomico-pathologiques sur l'encéphale et ses dépendances (Paris, 1820–1836), established his reputation, and was translated into many languages.

He was a renowned authority on spermatorrhea. In 1845 he was elected to the French Academy of Sciences, removed to Paris, and was consulted by patients from every part of Europe. One of his famous patients in Montpellier was Ibrahim Pasha (1789–1848), who became viceroy of Egypt in 1848.

== Works ==
- Recherches anatomico-pathologiques sur l'encéphale et ses dépendances, Paris, 1820–1836
- Des Pertes séminales involontaires (On involuntary seminal losses), 3 vols, 1836–1842
