= Shenxu =

Shenxu may refer to:

- Shēnxū (申胥), an aristocratic title of Chinese general and statesman Wu Zixu (died 484 BC)
- Shènxū (腎虛), also known as Shenkui, a culture-bound psychiatric syndrome native to China
