= Shenkui =

- Pronunciation: shen-kʼuei
- Specialty: Psychiatry

Shenkui (simplified Chinese: 肾亏; traditional Chinese: 腎虧; pinyin: shènkuī) is a traditional Chinese medicinal term in which the individual suffers withdrawal-like symptoms, including chills, nausea, and even flu-like symptoms with anxiety, believed to be caused by an orgasm and loss of semen. The symptoms can last weeks to months after a single orgasm. In traditional Chinese medicine, the kidney (shen) is the reservoir of vital essence in semen (ching) and k’uei signifies deficiency.

Shenkui or shen-k'uei is one of several Chinese culture-bound syndromes locally ascribed to getting stuck in yang and the needing of yin to rebalance yang (Chinese: 陽). Semen is believed to be lost through sexual activity or masturbation, nocturnal emissions, "white urine" which is believed to contain semen, or other mechanisms. Symptoms within the Chinese diagnostic system include chills, dizziness, backache, tiredness, weakness, insomnia, frequent dreams, and complaints of sexual dysfunction (such as premature ejaculation or impotence). From an ethnopsychiatric perspective, additional symptoms are preoccupation with sexual performance, potential semen loss, and bodily complaints.

== Signs and symptoms ==
Symptoms include:

- Withdrawal symptoms
- Brain fog
- Chills
- Dizziness
- Backache
- Tiredness
- Weakness
- Insomnia
- Frequent dreams
- Sexual dysfunctions; premature ejaculation or impotence.

== Origin ==
Chinese folk beliefs hold that the yin (Chinese: 陰) represents femininity, slowness, coldness, wetness, passivity, water, the moon, and night-time; and that yang represents masculinity, speediness, dryness, heat, aggressivity, fire, the sun, and daytime.

It is believed that loss of yang would result in an abundance of yin, and severe shenkui can result in death. Informal or incomplete education about sexual health in China leaves a lot of room for folk beliefs to thrive. Often, advertisements support such beliefs to encourage use of traditional medicines. In Chinese folk beliefs, loss of semen leads to imbalance in the body, causing aches, soreness, and erectile dysfunction.

== Treatment ==
Many people who believe they suffer from shenkui seek out traditional medicinal cures thought to restore balance to yin and yang. An affected person may also go to a medical clinic that specializes in Western sexual health. If no medical problems are found, therapy may be used to help deal with stress, or anxiety medicines may be used.

== See also ==
- Postorgasmic illness syndrome
- Cross-cultural psychiatry
- Koro
- Dhat syndrome
- NoFap
