= Odynorgasmia =

Pain during or following ejaculation

- Other names: Painful ejaculation, dysejaculation, dysorgasmia, and orgasmalgia.
- Specialty: Urology

Odynorgasmia, or painful ejaculation, also referred to as dysejaculation, dysorgasmia, and orgasmalgia, is a physical syndrome described by pain or burning sensation of the urethra or perineum during or following ejaculation. Causes include: infections associated with urethritis, prostatitis, epididymitis; use of anti-depressants; cancer of the prostate or of other related structures; calculi or cysts obstructing related structures; trauma to the region.

== Signs and symptoms ==
Ejaculations that hurt can range in intensity from mild discomfort to unbearable agony. Everywhere in the pudendal territory, including the penis, scrotum, and perineal/perianal area, is susceptible to it. Usually starting right before or during ejaculation, the pain usually lasts for two to twenty-four hours. The person may have less sexual desire and self-worth as a result of this issue, which could lead to a lower quality of life.

== Causes ==
Ejaculation pain can be caused by a variety of medical conditions, but it can also be an idiopathic issue. Early reports suggested that painful ejaculation may be associated with herniorrhaphy, pelvic radiation, prostate surgery, benign prostatic hyperplasia, prostate cancer, inflammation of prostate, antidepressants, sexually transmitted diseases, sexual neurasthenia, and calculi in the seminal vesicles.

== Treatment ==
The cause of post-orgasmic pain determines the course of treatment. Antibiotics and non-steroidal anti-inflammatory medications are prescribed if infectious or inflammatory processes are thought to be the cause. Transurethral seminal vesiculoscopy is the preferred method for treating pain associated with seminal vesicles. Balloon dilatation or transurethral ejaculatory duct resection are two treatments for ejaculatory duct obstruction. In one study, tamsulosin-treated patients' symptoms significantly improved after four weeks of treatment. This is also helpful for painful ejaculation following radical prostatectomy.
