= Aftercare (BDSM) =

Sexual practice

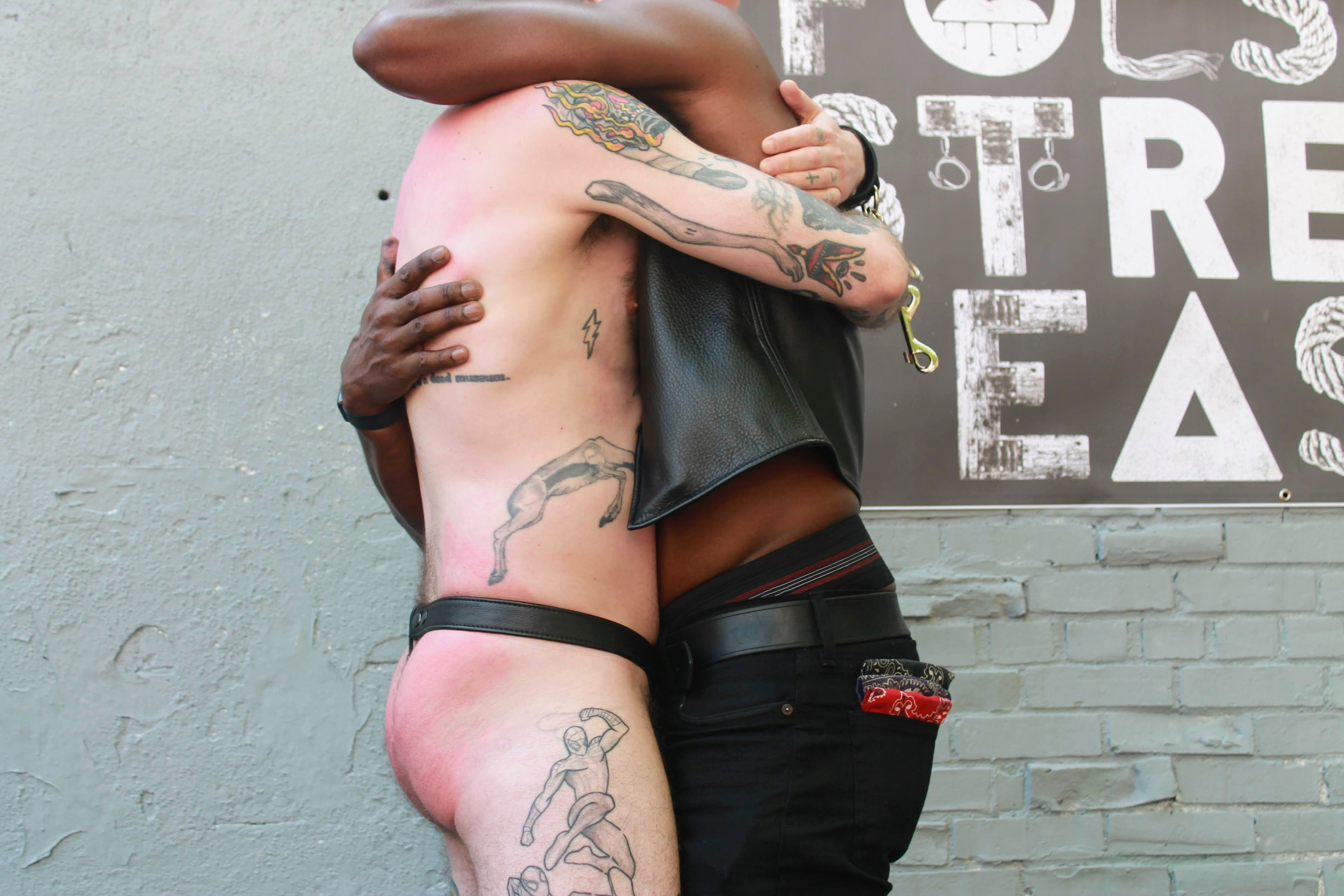
Post-flogging-demonstration embrace/aftercare at Folsom Street East Fair 2023

Aftercare refers to the process of providing emotional, psychological, or physical support to participants following BDSM activities. These activities can be mentally, emotionally, or physically intense, often leaving participants in need of comfort, reassurance, or physical tenderness. Aftercare may also involve a review or debriefing of the session to reflect on the experience and address any concerns or successes.

== Overview ==
Engaging in a scene with a partner can be emotionally taxing, with intense releases of hormones such as dopamine and oxytocin. During sex, these hormones and emotions can heighten pleasure and the experience, however the sudden drop-off of these hormones and exhilaration may lead to depressive moods after sex. This can cause post-coital dysphoria or strains on relationships with a sexual partner. Aftercare is meant to combat this sudden drop and allow the body and mind to adjust back to everyday living while those hormones fade. While aftercare often includes physical closeness, such as hugging, kissing, hair-stroking, or cuddling, it can also involve verbal affirmations, gratitude, or even "vanilla" sexual activities like fellatio. Some participants may prefer to be alone or process their experiences other ways, particularly if they feel unsafe or tired.

Aftercare is not limited only to submissive participants. Dominant participants may require equal or greater levels of support depending on the intensity of the scene, their experience, and personal needs. The need for aftercare is highly individual and unrelated to a participant's role as dominant or submissive.

In long-distance BDSM relationships, aftercare can include the exchange of emotionally significant items to provide reassurance and maintain a connection. The effectiveness of such practices depends on the emotional investment of both parties.

Despite originating in the BDSM community, aftercare is becoming more mainstream, including under different terms such as simply "cuddling" after sex.

== Emotional benefits ==
Emotional responses to BDSM activities vary significantly, ranging from euphoria to sadness or depression. Intense spurs of anxiety and depression after sex may be symptoms of post-coital dysphoria (PCD), informally known as post-sex blues and not to be confused with the clear-headedness of "post-nut clarity". A 2015 study published in the Journal of Sexual Medicine found that 46% of women and 41% of men – not just BDSM participants – reported feeling dysphoria after sex at least once in their lives. PCD and other forms of anxiety or irritability are caused by heightened emotional sensitivity from the rush of various hormones. Aftercare helps to combat PCD, as a way to regulate and enhance the security that an individual feels after intercourse. It acts to bring an individual from the intensity of intimacy back into normalcy.

== Relational benefits ==
Trust and communication are foundational to BDSM practices. Partners are encouraged to clearly express their desires, establish boundaries, and agree on a safeword or signal to stop activities if necessary. Aftercare, which often includes affectionate and caretaking behaviors, is essential for decompressing after a scene and strengthening intimacy between participants. These practices not only promote emotional recovery but also help reinforce trust through post-scene discussions, allowing partners to address what worked and what did not.

Aftercare also helps to generate more relational and sexual satisfaction after having intercourse. Given that the time following sexual activity is often more emotional, it is an excellent time to reinforce relations/connection with the other person. Research suggests things as simple as verbal communication occurring during this time is especially important, and early studies also show that the "afterplay" serves in sexual and relationship satisfaction just as much as, or even more than, other facets of intimacy such as foreplay or orgasm. The longer that these exchanges last post-sex, the greater benefit towards the relationship and greater sexual satisfaction.

== Common aftercare practices ==
Aftercare practices can vary widely depending on individual preferences and the intensity of the BDSM scene. Some common practices include cuddling, which is a low-energy activity that helps release oxytocin, a hormone known for reducing stress and increasing intimacy. Rehydration and snacks are also common, as drinking water and eating can replenish energy and provide comfort after an intense scene. Addressing minor injuries is another practice; for those engaging in more extreme forms of BDSM, such as blood or knife play, aftercare may involve disinfecting and patching up wounds to ensure safety and well-being. Sleeping together is a frequent practice, as taking a nap or sleeping together fosters intimacy and physical connection. Watching a movie is another option, and a lighthearted or funny movie offers a way to relax completely while sharing cuddles and snacks. Recounting the scene is a common practice where partners may discuss the scene, sharing what they liked, disliked, or wish to try in the future; this communication builds trust and ensures mutual understanding. Kissing or slow sex is practiced by some, as slow and sensual sexual activity can function as a form of aftercare, helping reconnect participants to themselves and their partner rather than their roles during the scene. Words of affirmation – such as telling one's partner that they are loved and safe, or praising their performance – can provide reassurance and emotional support. Gentle massages, soothing music, and dim lighting also allow partners to wind down while sharing physical affection.
