= Aftercare =

Aftercare is the care and treatment of a convalescent patient.

The term is often used in:

- Convalescence
- Patient
- Treatment
- Hospital
- Surgery
- BDSM (see: Aftercare (BDSM))

== See also ==
- Recidivism (for attention to psychological and addiction treatment options available to released convicts)
