= Ejaculation =

Semen discharge from the male reproductive tract

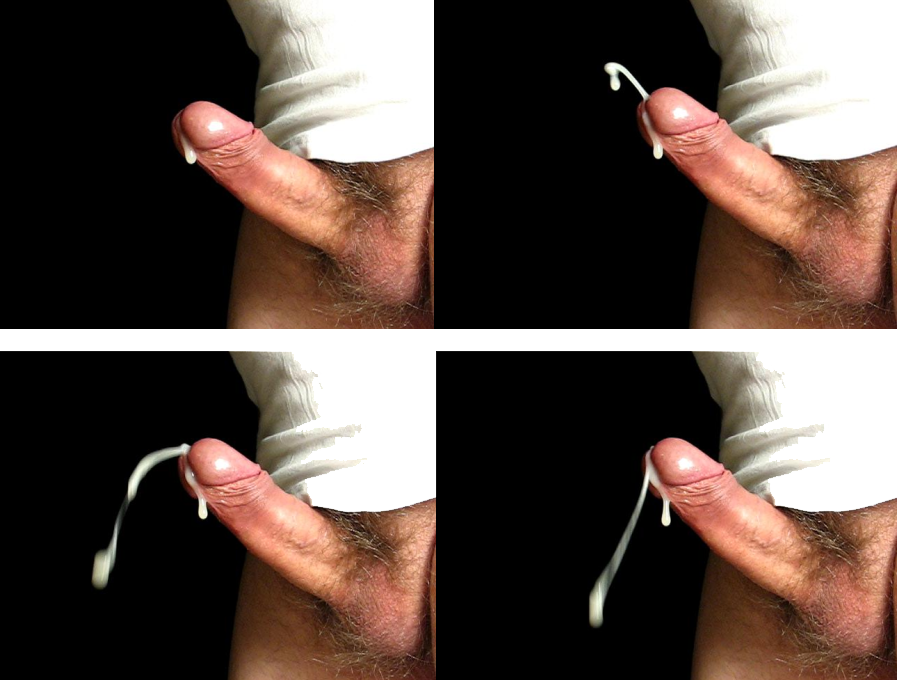
- A man ejaculating, following sexual stimulation

Identifiers
- MeSH: D004542
- TE: E1.0.0.0.0.0.10

Ejaculation is the discharge of semen (the ejaculate; normally containing sperm) from the penis through the urethra. It is the final stage and natural objective of male sexual stimulation, and an essential component of natural conception. After forming an erection, many men emit pre-ejaculatory fluid during stimulation prior to ejaculating. Ejaculation involves involuntary contractions of the pelvic floor and is normally linked with orgasm. Males become able to ejaculate during puberty.

Ejaculation can occur spontaneously during sleep (a nocturnal emission or "wet dream") or in rare cases because of prostatic disease. Anejaculation is the condition of being unable to ejaculate. Dysejaculation is an ejaculation that is painful or uncomfortable. Retrograde ejaculation is the backward flow of semen from the urethra into the bladder. Premature ejaculation happens shortly after initiating sexual activity, and hinders prolonged sexual intercourse. A vasectomy alters the composition of the ejaculate as a form of permanent birth control.

== Phases ==
=== Stimulation ===
The normal precursor to ejaculation is sexual arousal of the male, leading to the erection of the penis, though not all arousals or erections lead to ejaculation, and ejaculation does not require erection. Penile sexual stimulation during masturbation or vaginal, anal, oral, manual, or non-penetrative sexual activity may provide the necessary stimulus for a man to achieve orgasm and ejaculation.

Men typically reach orgasm and ejaculate about five to seven minutes after the start of penile-vaginal intercourse, taking into account their desire and that of their partners, but 10 minutes is also a common intravaginal ejaculation latency time. Sexual stimulation either through foreplay (kissing, petting and direct stimulation of erogenous zones before penetration during intercourse) or stroking (during masturbation) leads to arousal and production of pre-ejaculatory fluid. Infectious agents (including HIV) can be present in pre-ejaculate.

=== Emission phase ===
During the emission phase of ejaculation, sperm travels from the epididymis through the vas deferens mixing with fluids from the male accessory glands as it enters the urethra. During the expulsion phase, rhythmic contractions of the pelvic floor and bulbospongiosus muscles expel the semen from the penis through the urinary meatus in several spurts.

Video of a human male ejaculating

Once the penis has achieved sufficient stimulation for the man to reach orgasm, ejaculation begins. The initial stage of ejaculation, called emission, is controlled by a reflex in the sympathetic spinal cord. Sperm undergo their final developmental changes within the epididymis, where they are held until being ejaculated.

=== Expulsion phase ===
Ejaculation reaches its peak in the expulsion phase, which involves the discharge of semen from the urethral opening. This ejection is driven by coordinated contractions of the pelvic muscles, including the bulbospongiosus and pubococcygeus muscles, while the internal urethral sphincter stays shut and the external urethral sphincter is relaxed. These rhythmic contractions are part of the male orgasm under the control of a spinal reflex at the level of the spinal nerves S2–4 via the pudendal nerve. Although the external sphincter and pelvic muscles can be voluntarily controlled, any voluntary control during semen expulsion is not evident. The expulsion phase is considered an extension of the emission phase, triggered by reaching a certain level of spinal nerve activation. The typical male orgasm lasts several seconds.

Premature ejaculation is when ejaculation occurs before it is desired. Otherwise, if a man is unable to ejaculate after prolonged sexual stimulation in spite of his desire, it is called delayed ejaculation or anorgasmia. An orgasm that is not accompanied by ejaculation is known as a dry orgasm.

At start of orgasm, pulses of semen begin to flow from the urethra, reach a peak of discharge and then diminish in flow. The typical orgasm consists of 10 to 15 contractions, although the man may not be consciously aware of so many. After the first contraction, ejaculation continues to completion involuntarily. During this stage, ejaculation cannot be stopped. The rate of contractions gradually slows throughout the orgasm. Initial contractions occur on average every 0.6 seconds with an increasing increment of 0.1 seconds per contraction. Contractions of most men proceed at regular rhythmic intervals through their duration. Many men also experience irregular contractions at the end of the orgasm.

Ejaculation usually begins during the first or second contraction of orgasm. For most men, the first ejection occurs during the second contraction, which is typically the largest, expelling 40% or more of total semen discharge. After this peak, the quantity of semen emitted by the penis diminishes as the contractions lessen in intensity. The muscle contractions of the orgasm can continue after ejaculation with no additional semen discharge. A small sample study of seven men showed an average of seven spurts of semen followed by an average of 10 more contractions with no semen expelled. This study also found a high correlation between number of spurts of semen and total ejaculate volume, i.e., larger semen volumes resulted from additional pulses of semen rather than larger individual spurts.

Alfred Kinsey measured the distance of ejaculation, in "some hundreds" of men. In three-quarters of men tested, ejaculate "is propelled with so little force that the liquid is not carried more than a minute distance beyond the tip of the penis." In contrast to those test subjects, Kinsey noted "In other males the semen may be propelled from a matter of some inches to a foot or two, or even as far as five or six and (rarely) eight feet". Masters and Johnson report ejaculation distance to be no greater than 30–60 cm (12–24 in). During the series of contractions that accompany ejaculation, semen is propelled from the urethra at 500 cm/s (200 in/s), close to 18 km/h (11 mph).

=== Refractory period ===
Most men experience a refractory period immediately following an orgasm, during which they are unable to achieve another erection, and a longer period before they are capable of achieving another ejaculation. During this time, a male feels a deep and often pleasurable sense of relaxation, usually in the groin and thighs. The length of the refractory period varies considerably, even for a given individual. Age affects the recovery time, with younger men recovering faster than older men, though not always.

Whereas some men have refractory periods of 15 minutes or more, others are able to experience sexual arousal immediately after ejaculation. A short recovery period may allow partners to continue sexual play relatively uninterrupted by ejaculation. Some men may experience their penis becoming hypersensitive to stimulation after ejaculation, which can make sexual stimulation unpleasant even while they may be sexually aroused.

Some men are able to achieve multiple orgasms, with or without the typical sequence of ejaculation and refractory period. Some of those men report not noticing refractory periods, or are able to maintain erection by "sustaining sexual activity with a full erection until they passed their refractory time for orgasm when they proceeded to have a second or third orgasm".

=== Volume ===
The force and amount of semen that is ejected during ejaculation varies widely among men, on average 3.2ml but in a study of 1300 men it was between 0.1 and 10 milliliters (for comparison, a teaspoon holds 5 ml and a tablespoon, 15 ml). Adult semen volume is affected by the time that has passed since his previous ejaculation; larger semen volumes develop with longer abstinence. The duration of the stimulation leading to ejaculation is uncorrelated with the volume. Abnormally low semen volume is known as hypospermia and abnormally high semen volume is called hyperspermia. One possible underlying cause of low volume or complete lack of semen is ejaculatory duct obstruction. It is normal for the amount of semen to diminish with age.

=== Quality ===
The number of sperm in an ejaculation varies widely, depending on many factors including the time since the previous ejaculation, age, stress levels, and testosterone. Longer time of sexual stimulation immediately preceding ejaculation can result in higher concentration of sperm. An unusually low sperm count, distinguished from low semen volume, is known as oligospermia, and the absence of any sperm from the semen is termed azoospermia.

== Development ==
=== During puberty ===
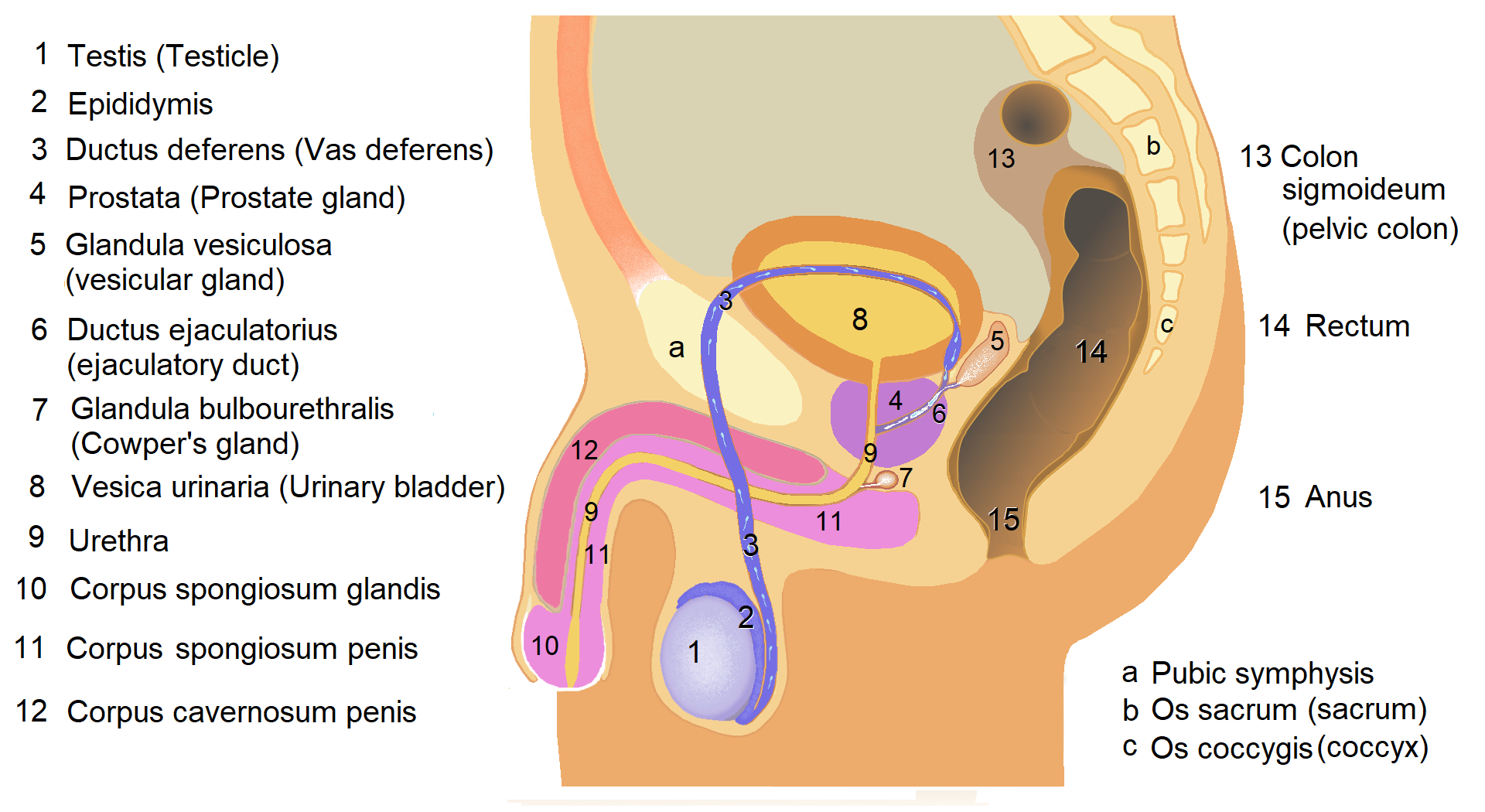
Diagram of the male pelvic and reproductive organs

The first ejaculation in males often occurs about 12 months after the onset of puberty, generally through masturbation or nocturnal emission (wet dreams). This first semen volume is small. The typical ejaculation over the following three months produces less than 1 ml of semen. The semen produced during early puberty is also typically clear. After ejaculation this early semen remains jellylike and, unlike semen from mature males, fails to liquefy. A summary of semen development is shown in Table 1.

Most first ejaculations (90%) lack sperm. Of the few early ejaculations that do contain sperm, the majority of sperm (97%) lack motion. The remaining sperm (3%) have abnormal motion.

As the male proceeds through puberty, the semen develops mature characteristics with increasing quantities of normal sperm. Semen produced 12 to 14 months after the first ejaculation liquefies after a short period of time. Within 24 months of the first ejaculation, the semen volume and the quantity and characteristics of the sperm match that of adult male semen.

Semen development during puberty
Time after first ejaculation (months)	Average volume (milliliter)	Liquefaction	Average sperm concentration (million sperm/milliliter)
0	0.5	No^{a}	0
6	1.0	No^{a}	20
12	2.5	No/Yes^{b}	50
18	3.0	Yes^{c}	70
24	3.5	Yes^{c}	300

- ^a Ejaculate is jellylike and fails to liquefy.
- ^b Most samples liquefy. Some remain jellylike.
- ^c Ejaculate liquefies within an hour.

=== Control from the central nervous system ===
There is a central pattern generator in the spinal cord, made up of groups of spinal interneurons, that is involved in the rhythmic response of ejaculation. This is known as the spinal generator for ejaculation.

To map the neuronal activation of the brain during the ejaculatory response, researchers have studied the expression of c-Fos, a proto-oncogene expressed in neurons in response to stimulation by hormones and neurotransmitters. Expression of c-Fos in the following areas has been observed:

- medial preoptic area (MPOA)
- lateral septum, bed nucleus of the stria terminalis
- paraventricular nucleus of hypothalamus (PVN)
- ventromedial nucleus of the hypothalamus, medial amygdala
- ventral premammillary nuclei
- ventral tegmental area
- central tegmental field
- mesencephalic central gray
- peripeduncular nuclei
- parvocellular subparafascicular nucleus (SPF) within the posterior thalamus

=== Hands-free ejaculation ===
Although uncommon, some men can achieve ejaculations during masturbation without any manual stimulation. Such men usually do it by tensing and flexing their abdominal and buttocks muscles along with vigorous fantasizing. Others may do it by relaxing the area around the penis, which may result in harder erections especially when extremely aroused. Hands-free ejaculation can also be achieved by prostate stimulation alone, either internally (with the use of sex toys, fingers or performing anal sex or pegging) or externally (such as perineum massages), although prostate orgasms without ejaculation (dry orgasms) are also possible.

=== Perineum pressing and retrograde ejaculation ===
Perineum pressing results in an ejaculation which is purposefully held back by pressing on either the perineum or the urethra to force the seminal fluid to remain inside. In such a scenario, the seminal fluid stays inside the body and goes to the bladder. Some people do this to avoid making a mess by keeping all the semen inside. As a medical condition, it is called retrograde ejaculation.

== Health issues ==
For most men, no detrimental health effects have been determined from ejaculation itself or from frequent ejaculations, though sexual activity in general can have health or psychological consequences. A small fraction of men have a disease called postorgasmic illness syndrome (POIS), which causes severe muscle pain throughout the body and other symptoms immediately following ejaculation. The symptoms last for up to a week. Some doctors speculate that the frequency of POIS "in the population may be greater than has been reported in the academic literature", and that many POIS sufferers are undiagnosed.

It is not clear whether frequent ejaculation has any effect on the risk of prostate cancer. Two large studies examining the issue were "Ejaculation Frequency and Subsequent Risk of Prostate Cancer" and "Sexual Factors and Prostate Cancer". These suggest that frequent ejaculation after puberty offers some reduction of the risk of prostate cancer. The US study involving 29,342 US men aged 46 to 81 years suggested that "high ejaculation frequency was related to decreased risk of total prostate cancer". An Australian study involving 1,079 men with prostate cancer and 1,259 healthy men found that "there is evidence that the more frequently men ejaculate between the ages of 20 and 50, the less likely they are to develop prostate cancer":

[T]he protective effect of ejaculation is greatest when men in their twenties ejaculated on average seven or more times a week. This group were one-third less likely to develop aggressive prostate cancer when compared with men who ejaculated less than three times a week at this age.

== Other animals ==
In many mammalian and avian species, males often ejaculate multiple times during a single mating event or repeatedly over a breeding season. During copulation, the two sides of a short-beaked echidna's penis are used sequentially. Alternating between the two sides allows for persistent stimulation to induce ejaculation without impeding the refractory period.

In stallions, ejaculation is accompanied by a motion of the tail known as "tail flagging". When a male wolf ejaculates, his final pelvic thrust may be slightly prolonged. A male rhesus monkey usually ejaculates less than 15 seconds after sexual penetration. The first report and footage of spontaneous ejaculation in an aquatic mammal was recorded in a wild Indo-Pacific bottlenose dolphin near Mikura Island, Japan, in 2012.

In horses, sheep, and cattle, ejaculation occurs within a few seconds, but in boars, it can last for five to thirty minutes. Ejaculation in boars is stimulated when the spiral-shaped penis interlocks with the female's cervix. A mature boar can produce 250–300 ml (8.8–10.6 imp fl oz; 8.5–10.1 US fl oz) of semen during one ejaculation. In llamas and alpacas, ejaculation occurs continuously during copulation.

The semen of male dogs is ejaculated in three separate phases. The last phase of a male canine's ejaculation occurs during the copulatory tie, and contains mostly prostatic fluid.

== See also ==
- Aspermia
- Coitus interruptus
- Coitus reservatus
- Cum shot
- Facial (sexual act)
- Female ejaculation
- Fertilisation
- Hematospermia
- Insemination
- Sperm donation
- Spermatorrhea
