= Refractory period (sex) =

Recovery period after orgasm before another is possible

In human sexuality, the refractory period is usually the recovery phase after orgasm during which it is physiologically impossible to have additional orgasms. In males, this phase begins immediately after ejaculation and lasts until the excitement phase of the human sexual response cycle begins anew with low-level response. Some sources report that females do not experience a refractory period and can thus experience an additional orgasm (or multiple orgasms) soon after the first one. However, other sources indicate that many if not most females experience a refractory period after orgasm during which further sexual stimulation causes discomfort and does not produce excitement.

== Factors and theories ==
Although the refractory period varies widely among individuals, ranging from minutes to days, most men cannot achieve or maintain an erection during this time, and many perceive a psychological feeling of satisfaction and are temporarily uninterested in further sexual activity; the penis may be hypersensitive, and further sexual stimulation may feel painful during this time frame.

An increase in the infusion of the hormone oxytocin during ejaculation is believed to be chiefly responsible for the male refractory period, and the amount by which oxytocin is increased may affect the length of each refractory period. Another chemical which some consider to be responsible for the male refractory period is prolactin, which is repressed by dopamine and is responsible for sexual arousal. However, there is no consensus for such a causative relationship; some studies suggest that prolactin has no effect on the refractory period. It is additionally proposed that the gonadotropin-inhibitory hormone (GnIH), which is considered to inhibit the hypothalamic-pituitary-gonadal axis and sexual functions, causes refractoriness of the post-ejaculatory refractory period. This hypothesis also supports the increase of oxytocin and prolactin after orgasm in accordance with the previous studies.

An alternative theory explains the male refractory period in terms of a peripheral autonomic feedback mechanism, rather than through central chemicals like oxytocin, serotonin, and prolactin. Autonomic feedback is already known to regulate other physiologic systems, such as breathing, blood pressure, and gut motility. This theory suggests that after ejaculation, decreased wall tension in structures such as the seminal vesicles leads to a change in the fine autonomic signals sent from these organs, effectively creating a negative feedback loop. Such a mechanism is similar to decreased gastric and bowel motility once gastric contents have passed through. Once the feedback loop has been created, the refractory period remains until the loop is broken through restoration of the wall tension in the seminal vesicles. As men age, the time to restore tension in the seminal vesicles increases.

The female sexual response is thought to be significantly more varied than that of men, and women are thought to be more capable than men of attaining multiple orgasms through further sexual stimulation, suggesting a shorter or absent refractory period in some women. A study has shown that the vast majority of women experience clitoral hypersensitivity after orgasm at similar rates to the refractory period in men, which is characterised by penile sensitivity. The findings of that same study also suggest a reconsideration of the refractory period in women and highlight the need for further research on post-orgasmic experiences that includes the female perspective. In addition, both men and women experience increased prolactin levels following orgasm for approximately 60 minutes, which is a neurobiological marker of the refractory period in males. Like men, it may be that only a minority of women are capable of multiple orgasms or lack a refractory period, but there are insufficient data to make a conclusion.

== Other studies ==
Men may have a reduced refractory period and may be capable of multiple orgasms. According to some studies, 18-year-old males have a refractory period of about 15 minutes, while those in their 70s take about 20 hours. Although rarer, some males exhibit no refractory period or a refractory period lasting less than 10 seconds. A scientific study attempting to document natural, fully ejaculatory, multiple orgasms in an adult man was conducted at Rutgers University in 1995. During the study, six fully ejaculatory orgasms occurred in 36 minutes, with no apparent refractory period.

Research on orgasm function after gender-affirming hormone therapy has also included the post-orgasm refractory period. A 2023 study of 130 transgender women and 33 transgender men who had received gender-affirming hormone therapy for at least one year assessed orgasm function during masturbation, including the duration of the post-orgasm refractory period. The study reported that transgender women had increases in time to orgasm, orgasm duration, and overall orgasm satisfaction after beginning hormone therapy, and that many participants reported a shift from short, single-peak orgasms to longer, multiple-peak orgasms.

== See also ==
- Coolidge effect
- Post-coital tristesse
- Post-nut clarity
