= Bellergal =

Combination drug

Combination of
- Atropa belladonna: Anticholinergic
- Ergotamine: Vasoconstrictor
- Phenobarbital: Barbiturate

Identifiers
- CAS Number: 57657-51-9
- PubChem CID: 56841786

Bellergal is a combination of levorotatory alkaloids of belladonna, ergotamine tartrate, and phenobarbital, used for the treatment of functional menopause, such as hot flashes and night sweat. Bellataminal is a trade name produced by Vilar.

Belladonna, including atropine, hyoscyamine and scopolamine, are antimuscarinic agents. They block acetylcholine from binding to its receptors. It generally reduces the secretion of the body, including mouth, nose, and skin, causes drowsiness and other anticholinergic effects. Phenobarbital provides sedative and anesthetic effects through depressing the central nervous system. 24 Ergotamine constricts blood vessels in the brain and alleviates headache through stimulating alpha-1, dopamine and serotonin receptors.

Common side effects of bellergal include drowsiness, flushing, nausea, vomiting, diarrhea, constipation, decreased sweating, visual disturbances, unusual fatigue or weakness and dry mouth. Bellergal has a high potential for potentially serious drug interactions due to strong CYP3A4 inhibition by ergotamine. Ergotamine is a vasoconstrictive CYP3A4 substrate.

Bellergal was widely used during the 1970s and 1980s. Its limited efficacy on decreasing hot flashes frequency and severity were demonstrated by several randomized controlled trials. On 6 June 2018, Bellergal was discontinued by Paladin Labs due to its raw material availability and limited efficacy. There are no bellergal tablets available in the markets now.

== Medical uses ==
The primary use of bellergal is for the treatment of alleviating menopause associated symptoms, include hot flashes, perspiration, palpitations, dizzy spells, restlessness, apprehension, fatigue, insomnia, and headache.

== Contraindications ==
This combination is contraindicated in those with hypersensitivity to the three active ingredients, and in those with narrow-angle glaucoma, hypertension, cardiovascular, liver, kidney, or circulation problems. People with high temperature, pregnant women, nursing mothers should also avoid this medication.

Prolong use of bellergal is not recommended due to the risk of ergotism and rare fibrotic complications. Patients should be informed of the maximum doses allowed and of the first symptoms of overdosage: hypoesthesia, paresthesia in the fingers and toes, nausea and vomiting, symptoms of myocardial ischemia and symptoms of ergotism including cerebral ischemia.

== Interactions ==
=== CYP3A4 inhibition ===
Ergotamine is a vasoconstrictive CYP3A4 substrate. The concurrent use of vasoconstricting ergot derivatives and strong CYP3A4 inhibitors, such as HIV protease or reverse transcriptase inhibitors, azole antifungals, or macrolide antibiotics, was associated with ergot toxicity. The inhibition of CYP3A4 leads to an increased level in serum concentration of Ergot derivatives. Extreme ischemia, coma or even death is the result. For this reason, the use with potent CYP3A4 inhibitors should be avoided when prescribing. Moderate CYP3A4 inhibitors such as berotralstat, conivaptan, crizotinib, diltiazem, dronedarone, duvelisib, fedratinib, fluconazole, fosnetupitant, grapefruit juice, imatinib, isavuconazonium sulfate, and lefamulin, should also be monitored closely. Cramping, pain and angina were reported. Patient should be monitored closely for ergot toxicity and the use with this treatment should be done with cautions.

== Pharmacology ==
=== Mechanism of action ===
Belladonna alkaloids, ergotamine tartrate, and phenobarbital are the three main components of Bellergal. The belladonna plant, which has numerous alkaloids with anticholinergic properties, yields the belladonna alkaloids. A fungus that lives on specific grains produces ergot alkaloids, of which ergotamine tartrate is a synthetic derivative. Barbiturate phenobarbital is an anticonvulsive and sedative drugs.

Three active components cooperate to alleviate menopausal symptoms. The belladonna alkaloids which is an anticholinergic drug acting on the autonomic nervous system. It could inhibit the parasympathetic nerve system by blocking the neurotransmitter, acetylcholine, from binding to chlolinergic receptor to lessen sweating and assist in body temperature regulation. Ergotamine tartrate could act as a vasoconstrictor that reduce the blood flow to the area of hot flash and hence lessens its intensity and frequency. The effects of the other two components are strengthened by the sedative phenobarbital.

== History ==
Bellergal was widely used during the 1970s and 1980s. Its limited efficacy on decreasing hot flashes frequency and severity were demonstrated by several randomized controlled trials. After 2 weeks of therapy, bellergal significantly reduced hot flashes, according to a randomized controlled experiment from the 1980s. The difference between the therapy and placebo, however, vanished after 8 weeks with decreases of 68% and 75%, respectively. Although Bellergal reduced hot flashes compared to placebo, there was a considerable amount of toxicity, with more than 30% of users discontinuing the medication owing to side effects as dry mouth, drowsiness, dizziness, and rash.

There were shortage reports related to phenobarbital from 18 July 2017 to 1 March 2018, disrupting the flow of the production process with quality, time and cost control. With all the factors considered, on 6 June 2018, Bellergal was discontinued by Paladin Labs due to its raw material availability and limited efficacy; while the remaining supply date was on 1 October 2017.

There are no bellergal tablets available in the markets now. Sandoz in Spain, France and Germany, Novartis in Switzerland, Thailand, Turkey and South Africa and Paladin in Canada discontinued the preparations. Instead, it is replaced by a new and similar formulation named as Bellegal-S, manufactured by Novartis in the United States of America. One of the active ingredients is changed to bellafoline (levorotatory alkaloids of belladonna).
