= N. N. Wig =

Indian psychiatrist (1930–2018)

- Born: Narendra Nath Wig; October 1, 1930; Gujranwala District, Punjab
- Died: July 12, 2018 (aged 87)
- Occupations: Academic, reaercher
- Known for: Dhat syndrome (1960)
- Awards: Rockefeller Foundation Fellowship

Academic background
- Education: King George's Medical University; University of Lucknow

Academic work
- Discipline: Psychiatrist, sociologist
- Sub-discipline: 20th-century psychiatrist, psychiatry research, Indian specialist
- Institutions: National Institute of Mental Health and Neurosciences
- Doctoral students: Salman Akhtar

N. N. Wig (born Narendra Nath Wig; 1 October 1930 – 12 July 2018) was an Indian scholar known for his contribution to modern psychiatry. He founded the psychiatry department of the Postgraduate Institute of Medical Education and Research in 1963, and was the originator of the Dhat syndrome which was coined in 1960.

== Early life and education ==
He was born in 1930, in the district of Gujranwala, Punjab. In 1953, he completed his MBBS from King George's Medical College, Lucknow. He then went to Lucknow University for his MD in Medicine in 1957. His interest in psychiatry led him to train at the National Institute of Mental Health and Neurosciences in Bangalore. He was Awarded a Rockefeller Foundation Fellowship, and went to the UK and US before returning to India in 1962 to establish the Department of Neuropsychiatry at KGMC Lucknow.

== Career ==
In 1963, Wig established the Department of Psychiatry at the Postgraduate Institute of Medical Education and Research in Chandigarh. Under his leadership, the department gained international recognition and became a World Health Organization collaborating center for mental health training and research in 1976.

Wig was known for his work in Community Mental Health. His studies in the villages of Raipur Rani, Haryana have reportedly become a model for Mental health in India and diaspora.

=== Contributions to psychiatry ===
He has authored over 300 scientific papers in journals and books, contributing significantly to psychiatric literature. He has also served on the World Psychiatric Association's Steering Committee, working to mitigate stigma and discrimination associated with mental illness.

=== Death ===
Since November 2017, he was unwell, and on July 12, 2018 he suffered a mild cardiac arrest and died at the age of 88.

== Selected publications ==
- Balgir, R. S.; Murthy, R. S.; Wig, N. N. (1980-06-01). "Manic-depressive psychosis and schizophrenia: a dermatoglyphic study". British Journal of Psychiatry. 136: 558–561. doi:10.1192/BJP.136.6.558. PMID 7388263.
- NN, Wig (2004-01-01). "Hanuman Complex And its Resolution : An Illustration of Psychotherapy from Indian mythology". Indian Journal of Psychiatry. 46 (1): 25–28. PMC 2912672. PMID 21206772.
- Wig, Nn; Sharma, Sheetal (2015). "Emperor Ashoka: Did he suffer from von Recklinghausen′s diseases?". Indian Journal of Psychiatry. 57 (1): 95. doi:10.4103/0019-5545.148536. ISSN 0019-5545. PMC 4314928. PMID 25657467.
- NN, Wig (2001-05-01). "Development of national mental health programmes in the countries of the eastern Mediterranean region". Eastern Mediterranean Health Journal. 7 (3): 348–352. PMID 12690752.
- NN, Wig; VK, Varma; SK, Mattoo; PB, Behere; HR, Phookan; AK, Misra; RS, Murthy; BM, Tripathi; DK, Menon; SK, Khandelawal; H, Bedi (1993-01-01). "An incidence study of schizophrenia in India". Indian Journal of Psychiatry. 35 (1): 11–17. PMC 2972559. PMID 21776160.
