= Postorgasmic illness syndrome =

Ejaculation-induced chronic symptoms

- Other names: POIS
- Specialty: Andrology, allergy, endocrinology neurology

Postorgasmic illness syndrome (POIS) is a syndrome involving chronic physical and cognitive symptoms following orgasm. The symptoms usually onset within seconds, minutes, or hours, and last for up to a week. The cause and prevalence are unknown; it is considered a rare disease. It typically affects men but in rare instances can affect women.

== Signs and symptoms ==
The distinguishing characteristics of POIS are:

1. the rapid onset of symptoms after orgasm;
2. the presence of an overwhelming systemic reaction.

POIS symptoms, which are called a "POIS attack", can include some combination of the following: cognitive dysfunction, aphasia, severe muscle pain throughout the body, severe fatigue, weakness, and flu-like or allergy-like symptoms, such as sneezing, itchy eyes, and nasal irritation. Additional symptoms include headache, dizziness, untimely sleepiness, lightheadedness, extreme hunger, sensory and motor problems, intense discomfort, irritability, anxiety, gastrointestinal disturbances, urinary tract disturbances, craving for relief, susceptibility to nervous system stresses, depressed mood, and difficulty communicating, remembering words, reading and retaining information, concentrating, and socializing. Affected individuals may also experience intense warmth or cold. An online anonymous self-report study found that 80% of respondents always experienced the symptom cluster involving fatigue, insomnia, irritation, and concentration difficulties.

The symptoms usually begin within 30 minutes of orgasm, and can last for several days, sometimes up to a week. In some cases, symptoms may be delayed by 2 to 3 days or may last up to 2 weeks.

In some men, the onset of POIS is in puberty, while in others, the onset is later in life. POIS that is manifested from the first ejaculations in adolescence is called primary type; POIS that starts later in life is called secondary type.

Many individuals with POIS report lifelong premature ejaculation, with intravaginal ejaculation latency time (IELT) of less than one minute.

The 7 clusters of symptoms of criterion 1:

1. General: Extreme fatigue, exhaustion, palpitations, problems finding words, incoherent speech, dysarthria, concentration difficulties, quickly irritated, cannot stand noise, photophobia, depressed mood
2. Flu-like: Feverish, extreme warmth, perspiration, shivery, ill with flu, feeling sick, feeling cold
3. Head: Headache, foggy feeling in the head, heavy feeling in the head
4. Eyes: Burning, red injected eyes, blurred vision, watery, irritating, itching eyes, painful eyes
5. Nose: Congested nose, watery/runny nose, sneezing
6. Throat: Dirty taste in mouth, dry mouth, sore throat, tickling cough, hoarse voice
7. Muscle: Muscle tension behind neck, muscle weakness, pain in muscles, heavy legs, stiff muscles
8. Skin: Some are becomes itchy, and sweaty for few days which is moderately noticeable.

=== Synonyms and related conditions ===
POIS has been called by a number of other names, including "postejaculatory syndrome", "postorgasm illness syndrome", "post ejaculation sickness", and "post orgasmic sick syndrome".

Dhat syndrome is a condition, N. N. Wig first coined the term and described in 1960 in India, with symptoms similar to POIS. Dhat syndrome is thought to be a culture-bound psychiatric condition and is treated with cognitive behavioral therapy along with anti-anxiety and antidepressant drugs.

Post-coital tristesse (PCT) is a feeling of melancholy and anxiety after sexual intercourse that lasts anywhere from five minutes to two hours. PCT, which affects both men and women, occurs only after sexual intercourse and does not require an orgasm to occur, and in that its effects are primarily emotional rather than physiological. POIS affects both men and women but more frequently affects men, consists primarily of physiological symptoms that are triggered by orgasm and that can last, in some people, for up to a week. While PCT and POIS are distinct conditions, some doctors speculate that they could be related.

An array of more subtle and lingering symptoms after orgasm, which do not constitute POIS, may contribute to habituation between mates. They may show up as restlessness, irritability, increased sexual frustration, apathy, sluggishness, neediness, dissatisfaction with a mate, or weepiness over the days or weeks after intense sexual stimulation. Such phenomena may be part of human mating physiology itself.

Sexual headache is a distinct condition characterized by headaches that usually begin before or during orgasm.

== Mechanism ==
The cause of POIS is unknown. Some doctors hypothesize that POIS is caused by an auto-immune reaction. Other doctors suspect a hormone imbalance as the cause. Different causes have also been proposed. None of the proposed causes can fully explain the disease.

=== Allergy hypothesis ===
According to one hypothesis, "POIS is caused by Type-I and Type-IV allergy to the males' own semen". This was conditioned by another study stating "IgE-mediated semen allergy in men may not be the potential mechanism of POIS".

Alternatively, POIS could be caused by an auto-immune reaction not to semen, but to a different substance released during ejaculation, such as cytokines.

=== Hormone hypothesis ===
According to another hypothesis, POIS is caused by a hormone imbalance, such as low progesterone, low cortisol, low testosterone, elevated prolactin, hypothyroidism, or low DHEA.

POIS could be caused by a defect in neurosteroid precursor synthesis. If so, the same treatment may not be effective for all individuals. Different individuals could have different missing precursors leading to a deficiency of the same neurosteroid, causing similar symptoms.

=== Withdrawal hypothesis ===
The majority of POIS symptoms like fatigue, muscle pains, sweating, mood disturbances, irritability, and poor concentration are also caused by withdrawal from different drug classes and natural reinforcers. It is unknown whether there is a relationship between hypersexuality, pornography addiction, compulsive sexual behavior and POIS. Some evidence indicates that POIS patients have a history of excessive masturbation, suggesting that POIS could be a consequence of sex addiction. There is anecdotal evidence on porn addiction internet forums, that many men experience POIS like symptoms after ejaculation.

=== Other possibilities ===
POIS could be caused by hyperglycemia or by chemical imbalances in the brain.

Sexual activity for the first time may set the stage for an associated asthma attack or may aggravate pre-existing asthma. Intense emotional stimuli during sexual intercourse can lead to autonomic imbalance with parasympathetic over-reactivity, releasing mast cell mediators that can provoke postcoital asthma and/or rhinitis in these patients.

It is also possible that the causes of POIS are different in different individuals. POIS could represent "a spectrum of syndromes of differing" causes.

None of the proposed causes for POIS can fully explain the connection between POIS and lifelong premature ejaculation.

== Diagnosis ==
There is no generally agreed upon diagnostic criteria for POIS. One group has developed five preliminary criteria for diagnosing POIS. These are:

1. one or more of the following symptoms: sensation of a flu-like state, extreme fatigue or exhaustion, weakness of musculature, experiences of feverishness or perspiration, mood disturbances and/or irritability, memory difficulties, concentration problems, incoherent speech, congestion of nose or watery nose, itching eyes;
2. all symptoms occur immediately (e.g., seconds), soon (e.g., minutes), or within a few hours after ejaculation that is initiated by coitus, and/or masturbation, and/or spontaneously (e.g., during sleep);
3. symptoms occur always or nearly always, e.g., in more than 90% of ejaculation events;
4. most of these symptoms last for about 2–7 days; and
5. disappear spontaneously.

POIS is prone to being erroneously ascribed to psychological factors such as hypochondriasis or somatic symptom disorder.

An online survey study suggested that only a small number of self-reported POIS fulfill entirely the five criteria. This study proposed to change the Criterion 3 with "In at least one ejaculatory setting (sex, masturbation, or nocturnal emission), symptoms occur after all or almost all ejaculations."

== Management ==
There is no standard method of treating or managing POIS. Patients need to be thoroughly examined in an attempt to find the causes of their POIS symptoms, which are often difficult to determine, and which vary across patients. Once a cause is hypothesized, an appropriate treatment can be attempted. At times, more than one treatment is attempted, until one that works is found.

Affected individuals typically avoid sexual activity, especially ejaculation, or schedule it for times when they can rest and recover for several days afterwards. In case post-coital tristesse (PCT) is suspected, patients could be treated with selective serotonin reuptake inhibitors.

Another patient, in whom POIS was suspected to be caused by cytokine release, was successfully treated with nonsteroidal anti-inflammatory drugs (NSAIDs) just prior to and for a day or two after ejaculation. The patient took diclofenac 75 mg 1 to 2 hours prior to sexual activity with orgasm, and continued twice daily for 24 to 48 hours.

One POIS patient with erectile dysfunction and premature ejaculation had much lower severity of symptoms on those occasions when he was able to maintain penile erection long enough to achieve vaginal penetration and ejaculate inside his partner. The patient took tadalafil to treat his erectile dysfunction and premature ejaculation. This increased the number of occasions on which he was able to ejaculate inside his partner, and decreased the number of occasions on which he experienced POIS symptoms. This patient is thought to have Dhat syndrome rather than true POIS.

Two patients, in whom POIS was suspected to be caused by auto-immune reaction to their own semen, were successfully treated by allergen immunotherapy with their own autologous semen. They were given multiple subcutaneous injections of their own semen for three years. Treatment with autologous semen "might take 3 to 5 years before any clinically relevant symptom reduction would become manifest".

Treatments are not always successful, especially when the cause of POIS in a particular patient has not been determined. In one patient, all of whose routine laboratory tests were normal, the following were attempted, all without success: ibuprofen, 400 mg on demand; tramadol 50 mg one hour pre-coitally; and escitalopram 10 mg daily at bedtime for 3 months.

In one case, after unsuccessful trials of other conventional treatments of antihistamines, NSAIDs and corticosteroids, the condition was entirely resolved by application of 300mg omalizumab. Notably, the initial intended dose of 150mg did not lead to resolution of symptoms. The patient was subsequently advised to take the medication for life at the dosage of 300mg.

== Epidemiology ==
The prevalence of POIS is unknown. POIS is listed as a rare disease by the American National Institutes of Health and the European Orphanet. It is thought to be underdiagnosed and underreported. POIS seems to affect mostly men from around the world, of various ages and relationship statuses.

=== Women ===
It is possible that a similar disease exists in women, though, as of 2016, there is only one documented female patient.

== Dealing with the condition ==
For most people affected, symptoms occur regularly after ejaculation. Many therefore minimize the frequency of sexual intercourse and masturbation, or even avoid them altogether. Most affected individuals plan the timing of sexual intercourse so that the subsequent symptoms have as little impact as possible on their work, studies, or social life. Many men who suffer from POIS worry about their relationship with their sexual partners and report feelings of guilt.
