= Sexual headache =

Headache that occurs during sexual activity

- Other names: Coital cephalalgia
- Specialty: Neurology

Sexual headache occurs in the skull and neck during sexual activity, including masturbation or orgasm. These headaches are usually benign, but occasionally are caused by intracranial hemorrhage and cerebral infarction, especially if the pain is sudden and severe. They may be caused by general exertion, sexual excitement, or contraction of the neck and facial muscles. Most cases can be successfully treated with medication.

== Signs and symptoms ==
According to the third edition of the International Classification of Headache Disorders (ICHD), which terms this condition primary headache associated with sexual activity, it normally begins as a dull headache that increases with sexual excitement, and becomes intense at orgasm, which is called sexual benign headache. For some patients, the headache begins suddenly, often at orgasm, which is called orgasm headache. In two-thirds of cases, it is bilateral, and unilateral in the rest. The pain lasts from one minute to 24 hours with severe intensity, or as long as 72 hours with mild intensity. Its occurrence is unpredictable, and may not follow every sexual act.

Previous editions of the ICHD divided the condition into two subforms: preorgasmic headache and orgasmic headache. These subforms were merged into one entity with varying presentation because clinical studies could not distinguish them. Postorgasmic headaches associated with posture may be better attributed to a spontaneous cerebrospinal fluid leak. Sudden, severe headaches during sexual activity may also be caused by intracerebral hemorrhage, subarachnoid hemorrhage, or cerebral infarction, which require immediate medical attention.

== Causes ==
For some patients, the headaches may be related to general exertion. About 40% of patients with sexual headaches in one study also experienced headaches from non-sexual exertion. A pressor response to exercise has been suggested as a mechanism. For other patients, the pain appears to be specifically activated by sexual excitement and contraction of facial and neck muscles.

Sporadic case studies have linked sexual headaches to the use of certain drugs, including amiodarone, pseudoephedrine, birth control pills, and cannabis. It may be secondary to another condition, such as reversible cerebral vasoconstriction syndrome. It is associated with migraines.

== Treatment ==
A physician may recommend engaging in sexual activity less strenuously. Case series have found indomethacin and beta blockers to be successful in treating these headaches. Propranolol, Bellergal, and triptans have also been used with success. Anecdotal and indirect evidence suggests a trial of magnesium supplementation may improve symptoms (in subjects with known or suspected low Mg levels).

== Epidemiology ==
These headaches are estimated to appear in roughly 1% of the population. They can occur with sexual activity at any age. It is more common in men than women, with studies putting the gender ratio between 1.2:1 and 3:1.

== See also ==
- Postorgasmic illness syndrome (POIS)
- Intracerebral hemorrhage
- Thunderclap headache
