= Post-nut clarity =

Mental clarity after orgasm

Post-nut clarity is a term describing the feeling of being clear-headed or mentally "reset" after orgasm in sexual intercourse or masturbation. Feelings of shame and disgust with oneself, as well as guilt, have also been associated with the term. Disgust and regret with the act of intercourse or with one's sexual partner has also been documented. The term "pre-nut delusion" is used to describe the opposite.

== Etymology and usage ==
The word "nut" is found in the slang phrase busting a nut, which refers to a male orgasm. The term post-nut clarity has been noted to be particularly used in online discussions. GQ cited one Twitter user who posted about the term in 2012. Similar terms have been documented even earlier: on the Japanese textboard 2channel, the term kenjataimu or "sage time", referring to the same concept, appeared as early as October 2007. The similar term post cum clarity can be traced back to a 2006 entry on Urban Dictionary.

The phrase has been referenced in songs by Dr. Dre, Drake, Juice WRLD, and Alemeda.

== Coverage and research ==
Various Internet media writers have described "post-nut clarity" as akin to an "aha" moment for men following intercourse. Media coverage of post-nut clarity often associates men with being able to anecdotally relate to having experienced it, though very often women also relate to experiencing the phenomenon.

While noted as similar to post-coital dysphoria (or post-coital tristesse), post-nut clarity has been discussed as a distinct phenomenon.

== In popular culture ==
This feeling was heavily referenced in the song Post Sex Clarity by Lola Young, from her album I'm Only F**king Myself (2025).

== See also ==
- Anagnorisis — moment in a play or other work when a character makes a critical discovery
- Eureka effect — suddenly understanding a previously incomprehensible problem or concept.
- Post-coital tristesse — feeling of sadness, anxiety, agitation or aggression after orgasm
- Refractory period (sex) — the recovery phase after orgasm during which it is physiologically impossible for males to have additional orgasms
