= Orgasmalgia =

Pain at the time of orgasm

Orgasmalgia refers to any pain that occurs at the time of an orgasm.
