= Spermatorrhea =

Excessive, involuntary ejaculation

Spermatorrhea, or spermatorrhoea, is a condition of excessive, involuntary seminal discharge. In several cultures, spermatorrhea referred to ejaculation outside of certain approved sexual practices and was thus a subjective term. A more modern medical definition is the excessive release of semen with no accompanying erection or orgasm.

In Western medicine during the 19th century, spermatorrhea was regarded as a medical disorder with corrupting and devastating effects on the mind and body. The cure for spermatorrhea was regarded as enforced chastity and avoidance of masturbation, with circumcision sometimes being used as a treatment.

Traditional Chinese medicine counts the production of semen as one of the biggest strains on jing (kidney essence). It is a recognized disorder in traditional Chinese medicine, in which certain patterns of involuntary ejaculation reflect problems with kidney qi.

In ayurvedic medicine, ashwagandha and bala are used to treat this vata ailment. The Indian Traditional Knowledge Digital Library also has medicinal prescription using the herb.

In the 18th and 19th centuries, if a patient had ejaculations outside marital intercourse, or released more semen than is typical, then he was diagnosed with a disease called spermatorrhea or "seminal weakness". A variety of drugs and other treatments, including circumcision and castration, were advised as treatment. Some alternative practitioners, especially herb healers, continue to diagnose and advise treatments for cases of spermatorrhea.

Spermatorrhea also occurs in seasonally breeding species of marsupials and monotremes.

== See also ==
- Jing (Chinese medicine)
- Kidney (Chinese medicine)
- Nocturnal emission
- Spermaturia, a condition characterized by the presence of sperm in the urine
