= Spermaturia =

Disease

- Specialty: Andrology, urology

Spermaturia is condition characterized by the presence of sperm in the urine.

It can be observed in males of other species and then sometimes diagnosed in veterinary medicine. The cause is most often a retrograde ejaculation. It may be physiological during urination after coitus (postcoital urination).

An irrational belief that one is experiencing spermaturia is a common symptom of Dhat syndrome.

== See also ==
- Urination and sexual activity
