= Post-coital tristesse =

Feeling of sadness, anxiety, agitation or aggression after sexual intercourse

- Other names: Post-coital dysphoria (PCD)
- Symptoms: Feeling of sadness, anxiety, agitation or aggression
- Duration: 5 minutes to 2 hours
- Causes: Sexual intercourse or masturbation
- Diagnostic method: Self-diagnosed

Post-coital tristesse (/triˈstɛs/; PCT), also known as post-coital dysphoria (PCD), is the feeling of sadness, anxiety, agitation or aggression, after orgasm in sexual intercourse or masturbation. Its name comes from Neo-Latin postcoitalis and French tristesse, meaning "sadness". Many people with PCT may exhibit strong feelings of anxiety lasting from five minutes to two hours after coitus.

== Historical and literary references ==
The phenomenon is attributed to the Greek medical writer Galen, who is supposed to have written that "Every animal is sad after coitus except the human female and the rooster." However, this quotation is not found in Galen's surviving writings, so it may be a later fabrication. Sigmund Freud and Havelock Ellis were familiar with the proverb, which they both attributed to an anonymous author, and it was not until decades later that the maxim became connected with Galen among sexologists.

The philosopher Baruch Spinoza, in his Tractatus de Intellectus Emendatione, wrote: "For as far as sensual pleasure is concerned, the mind is so caught up in it, as if at peace in a [true] good, that it is quite prevented from thinking of anything else. But after the enjoyment of sensual pleasure is passed, the greatest sadness follows. If this does not completely engross, still it thoroughly confuses and dulls the mind." Arthur Schopenhauer, writing later on the phenomenon, observed that "directly after copulation the devil's laughter is heard."

== General prevalence and factors ==
A study found the experience of postcoital symptoms was highly prevalent across both men and women, with 94.3% of all participants having experienced at least one symptom over their lifetime. Symptoms were reported experienced by 73.5% of participants after consensual sexual intercourse, 46.6% after masturbation, and 33.9% reporting the symptoms only following orgasm. The likelihood of this experience is heightened by conditions such as anxiety, depression, and a history of childhood or adult trauma.

== Prevalence and symptoms in men and women ==
One study reported that among a sample of 1208 male participants, 40% of them had experienced PCT at least once in their lifetime and 20% reported experiencing PCT in the four weeks preceding the study. This study also reports that 3–4% of the sample experienced PCT symptoms on a regular basis. According to the same study, PCT among males is associated with current psychological distress, sexual abuse during childhood, and with several sexual dysfunctions. The most common postcoital symptoms for men are unhappiness and low energy.

A study specifically on women reported that about 46% of participants had experienced PCD symptoms at least once in their lifetime, with 5.1% reporting occurrences a few times in the past four weeks. The study also reported that there appeared to be no correlation between PCT and intimacy in close relationships. Women experiencing postnatal depression are considered more likely to have PCD, potentially due to heightened sensitivity to hormonal fluctuations.

The most common postcoital symptoms reported for women were mood swings and sadness. Compared to men, women also reported experiencing higher rates of negative emotions, such as sadness, mood swings, frustration, and worthlessness.

== Prevalence and factors in sexual minority populations ==
Another study, found that 81% of participants identifying as bisexual or sexually fluid and 42% of males attracted to other males had experienced PCD at least once. Lower satisfaction with their sex life was found to be a factor to experiencing PCD for those identifying as bisexual or sexually fluid, with internalized sexual prejudice not significantly being a factor. For males attracted to other males, PCD was associated with both lower satisfaction with their sex life and perceived discrimination, but similarly, internalized sexual prejudice was not found to be a significant factor.

== See also ==
- After Sex (Post Coïtum, Animal Triste), 1997 film
- La petite mort
- Post-nut clarity
- Prolactin
- Refractory period (sex)
