= NoFap =

Internet community forum

- Website type: Private
- Available in: English
- Website: www.nofap.com; www.reddit.com/r/NoFap/
- Registration: Optional
- Users: ~1.2 million (as of August 2025)
- Launched: June 20, 2011; 15 years ago (subreddit)
- Current status: Active

NoFap is a website and community forum that serves as a support group for those who wish to give up pornography and masturbation. Its name comes from the slang term fap, referring to male masturbation. While reasons for this abstinence vary by individual, the main motivation cited is attempting to overcome addiction to pornography, (Note: Though the term 'addiction' is frequently used, a pornography addiction is not an addiction in the true sense of a brain disorder, and is instead more congruent with a behavioral addiction. Addiction to pornography, behavioral or not, is not recognised as a legitimate medical diagnosis.) or other compulsive sexual behaviours. Other reasons for abstinence include religious and moral reasons, self-improvement, and physical beliefs.

Many views within the group are not supported by medical science. The views within the group and efforts to combat pornography addiction have been criticized as simplistic, outdated, and incorrect by neuroscientists, psychologists, and other medical professionals. The purported science behind the group's activities is said to come from anti-porn activist Gary Wilson. Historian Brian M. Watson observed that Wilson lacked scientific credential and "made a career peddling pseudoscience".

As of January 6, 2024, the NoFap online community had more than 350,000 registered members.

== Founding ==
NoFap was founded in June 2011 by Pittsburgh web developer Alexander Rhodes after reading a thread on Reddit about a 2003 study, (which was retracted in 2021 due to overlap with another published article in Chinese), which claimed that men who refrain from masturbation for seven days experience a 145.7% spike in testosterone levels on the seventh day. This was featured on the front page of Reddit. The website states that some NoFap participants aim to "improve their interpersonal relationships", do a "challenge of willpower – to seize control of your sexuality and turn it into superpowers", but always with the goal of being able to "abstain from PMO (porn/masturbation/orgasm)". The expression fap is an onomatopoeic Internet slang term for male masturbation that first appeared in the 1999 webcomic Sexy Losers, used to indicate the sound of a male character masturbating.

While the website is most commonly associated with men seeking to quit porn and reduce masturbation, there are a minority of females who are users of the website as well, who are nicknamed "Femstronauts"; Alexander Rhodes has estimated that five percent of participants are women. Rhodes appears in the documentary written and directed by Nicholas Tana called Sticky: A (Self) Love Story, in which he discusses his findings and his opinions about masturbation. After this, Rhodes created NoFap as a subreddit forum community on Reddit. The endeavour is sometimes referred to as "fapstinence".

NoFap was a term from bodybuilding, and originally Alexander Rhodes used it as a joke. "In April 2015, Alexander Rhodes left a good job with Google" in order to develop NoFap.

=== NoFap.com ===
Users on NoFap's subreddit more than tripled in number in two years, leading Rhodes to build an off-Reddit forum at NoFap.com. NoFap.com is the sister website of the Reddit-hosted NoFap community.

== Membership ==
=== Demographics ===
A 2014 internet survey found that 99% of NoFap followers are male, although Rhodes said that women are also a part of NoFap. The membership of NoFap ranges from atheists, like founder Rhodes, to fundamentalist Christians. However, Rhodes has publicly solicited and received funding from religious groups. The users of the website call themselves "Fapstronauts". Some correspondents have nicknamed NoFap's community members "NoFappers", "fapstinent", or "no-fappers". Some self-described porn addicts seek out NoFap for help, while others join the website for the challenge or to improve their lives and interpersonal relationships.

=== Beliefs ===
The advocacy of NoFap has been summarized as "90 days of abstinence from porn, masturbation, and orgasms". A study of anti-porn attitudes among Polish Internet users found that "Despite the suggestive name, the official goal of the NoFap movement is not to encourage complete abstinence from masturbation, but to support internet users in the process of refraining from accessing pornographic materials and achieving various wellbeing goals related to sexual health", and this understanding of NoFap's mission is also acknowledged by other critical sources. After abstaining from porn and masturbation for a period of time, some of NoFap's users reported to experience various improvements in physical and mental health. Some NoFap users have commented that pornography can "warp" their psyche through exposure, at the expense of real relationships.

NoFap hosts a wide variety of different opinions on sexual health, and supports users with various goals as long as they are trying to improve their sexual health.

Some of the group's beliefs cite the work of Gary Wilson, an anti-pornography activist who has no medical or scientific training. Wilson's work is pseudoscientific.

The NoFap forums have had some antisemitic posts and posts suggesting conspiracy theories. These posts accused Jews and the Illuminati of having created and weaponized porn in order "to undermine white men". Jonny Hunt (2021 and 2024) also notes conspiracy theories and antisemitism: "that porn industry is orchestrated by Jews to bring down society."

=== Motivations ===
According to various sources, the majority of websites and YouTube channels devoted to anti-masturbation and anti-porn addiction propaganda, channels, and websites supporting NoFap are owned by far-right, religious fundamentalists, and conservatives who are biblical inerrantists, and also are entirely political in nature. The NoFap community has been perceived by some to be a part of the manosphere – online groups credited with propagating misogyny.

Psychologists, MDs, and social scientists stated that the traditional Christian focus on combating sexual activities, including masturbation, is unhealthy and unwholesome. This also applies to secular advocacy of anti-pornography and anti-masturbation, including 16 US states' legislatures which have declared that pornography is a "public health crisis".

The American Psychiatric Association had by then already dismissed such moral panic ("political stunt") in DSM-5 (published in 2013), and DSM-5-TR, published in March 2022, does not recognize a diagnosis of sexual addiction (which would include internet pornography viewing). Neither ICD-10, nor ICD-11 recognize sex addiction or porn addiction as a valid diagnosis.

Hamza Ahmed (nicknamed "the Adonis") appears in The Grift Economy (a report about the manosphere as a for-profit industry) as selling a discourse including NoFap. Panos Kompatsiaris analyzed in 2025 how NoFap discourses become "monetizable through online micro-celebrities and expert figures" (among them, Hamza Ahmed).

== Reception ==
Therapist Paula Hall for The Huffington Post was asked about NoFap claims of "physical health benefits mentioned including renewed energy, greater focus, concentration, and better sleep" and responded "there is little medical evidence for any of these changes". Therapist Robert Weiss for The Huffington Post sees NoFap as part of a tech backlash. The endeavor has also been criticized as generating embarrassing side effects such as prolonged or unwanted erections in men or an excessive libido. Psychologist David J. Ley wrote: "I'm not in opposition to them, but I do think their ideas are simplistic, naive and promote a sad, reductionistic and distorted view of male sexuality and masculinity". Ley criticizes NoFap supporters as amateurs who are using "bad data" and "extrapolations on weak science to argue that porn has a disproportionate effect on the brain" and claim that porn use causes erectile dysfunction. Ley has stated that the website is a continuation of the anti-masturbation movements from the past, such as Swiss doctor Samuel Tissot's 18th-century claims that masturbation was an illness that "weakened the male spirit" and led to immorality; American doctor Benjamin Rush, who claimed that masturbation caused blindness; and W.K. Kellogg, who developed corn flakes as part of his anti-masturbation efforts.

=== Research concerning NoFap forums and followers ===
NoFap has opposed the use of their data in mainstream scientific studies: their website includes legal warnings that scientists are prohibited from conducting research on them, and they have threatened to sue scientists who do.

A 2021 qualitative study found that NoFap's approach to pornography appeared to be harmful. Specifically, the scientists studied "members of the online NoFap/PornFree self-help communities" and concluded "commitment to abstinence, framed by the notions of recovery and relapse, was found to be a major factor for maintaining distress".

A 2020 study found that while NoFap claimed to be science-based, the more that NoFap followers believed that they should abstain from masturbation, the more they also reported "lower trust in science". Social psychologists Taylor and Jackson, who analyzed the content of NoFap forums, concluded in their study that some NoFap participants not only rejected pornography, but also radical feminist critiques of pornography. They also stated that some members of NoFap utilized and redeployed familiar hegemonic masculine views (e.g. men as dominant seekers of pleasure and women as the 'natural' suppliers of this pleasure), in turn reproducing societal expectations of gendered sexual dominance and submission. Another 2020 study stated that the forum represents itself as a source of medical information, which seems to discourage members from seeking actual medical advice and instead encourages self-diagnosis.

A 2020 study analysing discourse on pornography, published in the journal Social Forces, stated regarding NoFap: "These claims do not necessarily come from scientific experts. Instead, we find that newspaper articles draw from a variety of professionals who are not scientists" and that "Rhodes is quoted repeatedly reflecting that he was 'addicted to internet porn' and shares the personal consequences." They conclude "journalists and political actors are overextending scientific findings to advance their media markets and political agendas" in support of gender and sexual norms.

A 2020 paper stated that NoFap appears to have been specifically targeted by far-right groups, writing, "the struggle for the 'remasculinization' of white men by overcoming porn (addiction) had to be an antisemitic one: a fight against 'Jewish pornography' and 'Jewish filth,' in which other current anti-porn actors such as NoFap should join". Cultural studies scholar Simon Strick stated regarding NoFap that a "racist culture war...was already implied in the call to join the 'movement' by becoming abstinent". The chapter continues, "NoFap present themselves as a search for non-toxic and progressive gender roles, even as they partake in gendered and racialized narratives that are no less violent".

NoFap supporters have said been "known for vitriolically attacking female scholars not sharing their view". Sociologist Kelsy Burke stated that "Rhodes and a small staff manage NoFap.com and its brand full time". She states, "There is no scientific evidence that supports the idea of these superpowers. Yet hundreds of thousands of NoFap users insist they experience them." She critiques similar gender problems in groups including NoFap, stating, "The scientific and spiritual gets muddled together as participants reinforce damaging gender stereotypes—those of hypersexual, biologically ravenous men who are simply 'wired differently' than women. Women whose sexuality exists only in relation to male desire...porn addiction recovery reproduces the worst lessons of porn itself." NoFap forums were described, by a 2020 paper, as a place where "men's sexual entitlement to women was left unquestioned".

Claims of the semen retention community as well as those of the NoFap community are among the least accurate in respect to men's health. The medical orthodoxy attributes the sufferance of NoFap users to various mental disorders, rather than caused by PMO (porn, masturbation, orgasm). Prause and Binnie note that NoFap forums have included conspiracy theories seeking to explain this away. Jonny Hunt stated "NB: To be absolutely clear there is no scientific evidence to support #Nofap or their views are anyway beneficial to health." Alexander Monea stated "The proponents of NoFap often ground their claims on bad interpretations of science or pseudoscience." According to two Italian researchers, "many r/NoFap members have expressed concerns that the group is becoming more radicalized, aligning with Red Pill and Incel ideologies." The most prominent of the NoFap claims of benefits due to abstinence are not backed by evidence, and prolonged abstinence might exacerbate mental problems.

=== Criticism from journalists ===
Journalists have criticized NoFap. Some stating that the forums included misogynistic posts, stating that "there is a darker side to NoFap. Among the reams of Reddit discussions and YouTube videos, a fundamentally misogynistic rhetoric regularly emerges", and that "the NoFap community has become linked to wider sexism and misogyny, reducing women to sexual objects to be attained or abstained from and shaming sexually active women." Some NoFap followers have posted videos on YouTube that feature anti-homosexual and anti-woman values, such as "stop being a little bitch" demands. A New York Times story by Rob Kuznia expressed concern about white supremacists promoting the belief that pornography is a conspiracy of Judaism. Scientist Shane Kraus, PhD, speaking to CNET describes there is "no scholarship" supporting the Reboot claims of NoFap.

Der Spiegel stated that some NoFap adherents also belong to groups with members who have been connected to hate crimes and terrorist murders, arguing that there is a general potential for radicalization within the manosphere. NPR published an article that states that the NoFap forum had racist, misogynistic and violent posts. According to a journal from Utah, NoFap has difficulties in distancing itself from Christian nationalism and antisemitism. It also says that the "reboot" therapy is not supported by evidence. Aya Labanieh wrote "The older and more toxic vision, which inflects the fear of masturbation with nationalist paranoia and fascist notions of degeneracy, continues to haunt modern masculinity."

== Litigation ==
NoFap has been involved in legal actions filed or threatened by its founder, Alexander Rhodes. After threatening two scientists with litigation, the scientists published a letter defending the need to be allowed to criticize NoFap: "As [NoFap] operate in the public sphere, however, we deem it not only as legitimate but necessary to acknowledge and cite them as one prominent voice in the debate around masturbation abstinence—everything else would be an unjustifiable muting of their stand." NoFap threatened to sue The Spectator for writing about their association with far-right groups. Alexander Rhodes sued his own mother because she accused NoFap of getting involved with extremist organizations.

According to Prause's own paper, she "was awarded damages from Andrew Stebbins, the legal counsel of NoFap LLC founder" for defamation and revealing of her address. This is a mandatory disclosure she had to make under academic conflict of interest rules. In 2026, Rhodes filed a suit against Aylo, UCLA, the academic publisher Taylor and Francis, and two scientists (Prause and Ley) claiming RICO-style conspiracy. The lawsuit has been filed in a federal court. Prause has invoked the Federal Rule of Civil Procedure 11 against fake allegations. Her motion was denied, without prejudice.

== Similar sites ==
In 2017, an Independent article called "Inside the Community of Men Who Have Given Up Porn" noted that an alternative subreddit, /r/pornfree, is different from 'NoFap' as members abstain from pornography but not necessarily masturbation. Another Independent article, from 2018, described /r/pornfree as less 'extreme' compared to /r/nofap.

A study of NoFap reddit users found that NoFap members were most likely to also be members of TheRedPill, seduction, and similar men's rights and pick up artist Reddit groups. Another study reported a similar pattern that NoFap Reddit members also were likely to be supporters of U.S. President Donald Trump.

== See also ==
- Contraception Begins at Erection Act
- Controversial Reddit communities
- Effects of pornography
- No Nut November
- Opposition to pornography
- Postorgasmic illness syndrome
- Sex Addicts Anonymous
- Sex and Love Addicts Anonymous
- Sexaholics Anonymous
- Sexual abstinence
- Coitus reservatus
- Huanjing bunao
