= Hypersexuality =

Excessive arousal and interest in sex

- Specialty: Psychiatry

Hypersexuality is a proposed medical condition said to cause unwanted or excessive sexual arousal, causing people to engage in or think about sexual activity to a point of distress or impairment. Whether it should be a clinical diagnosis used by mental healthcare professionals is controversial. The terms nymphomania and satyriasis have historically been used to describe this condition in women and men, respectively.

Hypersexuality may be a primary condition, or the symptom of other medical conditions, such as Klüver–Bucy syndrome, post-traumatic stress disorder, bipolar disorder, brain injury, and dementia. Hypersexuality may also be a side effect of medication, such as dopaminergic drugs used to treat Parkinson's disease. Frontal lesions caused by brain injury, strokes, and frontal lobotomy are thought to cause hypersexuality in individuals who have suffered these events. Clinicians have yet to reach a consensus over how best to describe hypersexuality as a primary condition, or the suitability of describing such behaviors and impulses as a separate pathology.

Hypersexual behaviors are viewed by clinicians and therapists as a type of obsessive–compulsive disorder (OCD) or obsessive–compulsive spectrum disorder, an addiction, or an impulse-control disorder. A number of authors do not acknowledge such a pathology, and instead assert that the condition merely reflects a cultural dislike of exceptional sexual behavior.

Consistent with having no consensus over what causes hypersexuality, authors have used many different labels to refer to it, sometimes interchangeably, but often depending on which theory they favor or which specific behavior they have studied or researched; related or obsolete terms include compulsive masturbation, compulsive sexual behavior, cybersex addiction, erotomania, excessive sexual drive, hyperphilia, hypersexual disorder, problematic hypersexuality, sexual addiction, sexual compulsivity, sexual dependency, sexual impulsivity, and paraphilia-related disorder.

Due to the controversy surrounding the diagnosis of hypersexuality, there is no generally accepted definition and measurement for hypersexuality, making it difficult to determine its prevalence. Thus, prevalence can vary depending on how it is defined and measured. Overall, hypersexuality is estimated to affect 2–6% of the population, and may be higher in certain populations, like men, those who have been traumatized, and sex offenders.

== Causes ==
There is little consensus among experts as to the causes of hypersexuality. Some research suggests that some cases can be linked to biochemical or physiological changes that accompany dementia, as dementia can lead to disinhibition. Psychological needs also complicate the biological explanation, which identifies the temporal and frontal lobes of the brain as the areas for regulating libido. Injuries to this part of the brain increase the risk of aggressive behavior and other behavioral problems, including personality changes and sexual behavior, such as hypersexuality or pedophilia. The same symptom can occur after unilateral temporal lobotomy. There are other biological factors that are associated with hypersexuality, such as premenstrual changes, and the exposure to virilizing hormones in childhood or in utero.

=== Physiology ===
In research involving the use of antiandrogens to reduce undesirable sexual behavior such as hypersexuality, testosterone has been found to be necessary, but not sufficient, for sexual drive. A lack of physical closeness and forgetfulness of the recent past were proposed as other potential factors (specifically in the context of hypersexual behavior exhibited by people suffering from dementia).

Pathogenic overactivity of the dopaminergic mesolimbic pathway in the brain—forming either psychiatrically, during mania, or pharmacologically, as a side effect of dopamine agonists, specifically D_{3}-preferring agonists—is associated with various addictions and has been shown to result among some in overindulgent, sometimes hypersexual, behavior. HPA axis dysregulation has been associated with hypersexual disorder.

The American Association for Sex Addiction Therapy acknowledges biological factors as contributing causes of sex addiction. Other associated factors include psychological components (which affect mood and motivation as well as psychomotor and cognitive functions), spiritual control, mood disorders, sexual trauma, and sexual anorexia as causes or types of sex addiction.

Multiple studies link hypersexuality and ADHD. Like other related conditions, ADHD is heavily related to dopamine levels and pathways.

== As a symptom ==
Hypersexuality is known to present itself as a symptom in connection to a number of mental and neurological disorders. Some people with borderline personality disorder (sometimes referred to as BPD) can be markedly impulsive, seductive, and extremely sexual. Sexual promiscuity, sexual obsessions, and hypersexuality are very common symptoms for both men and women with BPD. On occasion for some there can be extreme forms of paraphilic drives and desires. "Borderline" patients, due in the opinion of some to the use of splitting, experience love and sexuality in unstable ways.

People with bipolar disorder may often display tremendous swings in sex drive depending on their mood. As defined in the DSM-IV-TR, hypersexuality can be a symptom of hypomania or mania in bipolar disorder or schizoaffective disorder. Pick's disease causes damage to the temporal/frontal lobe of the brain; people with Pick's disease show a range of socially inappropriate behaviors.

Several neurological conditions such as Alzheimer's disease, autism, various types of brain injury, Klüver–Bucy syndrome, Kleine–Levin syndrome, epilepsy and many neurodegenerative diseases can cause hypersexual behavior. Sexually inappropriate behavior has been shown to occur in 7–8% of Alzheimer's patients living at home, at a care facility or in a hospital setting. Hypersexuality has also been reported to result as a side-effect of some medications used to treat Parkinson's disease. Some recreationally used drugs, such as methamphetamine, may also contribute to hypersexual behavior.

A positive link between the severity of dementia and occurrence of hypersexual behavior has also been found. Hypersexuality can be caused by dementia in a number of ways, including disinhibition due to organic disease, misreading of social cues, understimulation, the persistence of learned sexual behavior after other behaviours have been lost, and the side-effects of the drugs used to treat dementia. Other possible causes of dementia-related hypersexuality include an inappropriately expressed psychological need for intimacy and forgetfulness of the recent past. As this illness progresses, increasing hypersexuality has been theorized to sometimes compensate for declining self-esteem and cognitive function.

Symptoms of hypersexuality are also similar to those of sexual addiction in that they embody similar traits. These symptoms include the inability to be intimate (intimacy anorexia), depression and bipolar disorders. The resulting hypersexuality may have an impact in the person's social and occupational domains if the underlying symptoms have a large enough systemic influence.

== As a disorder ==
In 2010, a proposal to add Sexual Addiction to the Diagnostic and Statistical Manual of Mental Disorders (DSM) system failed to get support from the American Psychiatric Association (APA). The DSM does include an entry called Sexual Disorder Not Otherwise Specified (Sexual Disorder NOS) to apply to, among other conditions, "distress about a pattern of repeated sexual relationships involving a succession of lovers who are experienced by the individual only as things to be used". As of December 2024, the DSM-5-TR does not recognize a diagnosis of sexual addiction.

The International Statistical Classification of Diseases and Related Health Problems (ICD-10) of the World Health Organization (WHO), included two relevant entries. One is "Excessive Sexual Drive" (coded F52.7), which is divided into satyriasis for males and nymphomania for females. The other is "Excessive Masturbation" or "Onanism (excessive)" (coded F98.8).

In 1988, Levine and Troiden questioned whether it makes sense to discuss hypersexuality at all, arguing that labeling sexual urges "extreme" merely stigmatizes people "who do not conform to the norms of their culture or peer group", and that sexual compulsivity was a myth. However, and in contrast to this view, 30 years later in 2018, the ICD-11 created a new classification, compulsive sexual behavior disorder, to cover a persistent pattern of failure to control intense, repetitive sexual impulses or urges resulting in repetitive sexual behaviour. It classifies failure to control as an abnormal mental health condition.

== Risks ==
Individuals with hypersexuality are at a higher risk for various negative consequences, such as contracting STIs, committing sexual abuse, damaging relationships, and developing other addictions. 27.5% of affected individuals contracted an STI on at least one occasion as a result of their hypersexual behavior, and 12% of affected individuals engage in excessive, unprotected sex with multiple anonymous partners. Additionally, an overwhelming 89% affected individuals admit to engaging in sexual activities outside of their primary relationship. This can negatively affect one's interpersonal and sexual relationships. In fact, 22.8% of sex addicts have had a relationship end due to their behaviors.

Furthermore, those with hypersexuality are more likely to have had or acquire another addiction. Multiple addictions are also prevalent amongst affected individuals. Common co-occurring disorders and addictions hypersexual individuals include eating disorders, compulsive spending, chemical dependency, and uncontrollable gambling.

== Assessment ==
Those seeking treatment for hypersexual behavior are a heterogeneous group, thus a thorough assessment is required to evaluate what kinds of behaviors and conditions need to be addressed and treated. It is essential for clinicians to conduct a comprehensive clinical interview with the patient, in which they address the history of their presenting problems, psychological history, sexual history, psychiatric history, mental health history, substance use history, and medical history. Understanding these facets of an individual exhibiting hypersexual behavior is crucial due to the diverse array of comorbid conditions potentially linked to hypersexuality. The presence of ongoing treatment for any coexisting conditions in the individual can also have an impact on their symptoms and subsequent therapeutic interventions. Supplemental information from a spouse or family member could also be used during assessments.

In addition to this, various questionnaires and instruments may be used to further assess various aspects of an individual's behaviors and symptoms. Some common questionnaires that are used in assessments are the Sexual Inhibition/Sexual Excitation Scale, Intensity of Sexual Desire and Symptoms Scale, Compulsive Sexual Behavior Inventory, Sexual Compulsivity Scale, and the Sexual Addiction Screening Test amongst others. Different instruments can also be used in assessments, including but not limited to the Clinical Global Impression Scale, Timeline Followback, Minnesota Multiphase Personality Inventory II, and the Millon Inventory.

== Treatment ==
The first step to treat hypersexual behavior is to help the individual stop or control their urges. There are a multitude of different treatment options for those experiencing hypersexual behaviors, and many clinicians recommend a multifaceted approach. Treatment plans are created after assessing the individual, so treatment methods can vary depending on an individual's history, current symptoms, and any comorbid conditions they may have. Common treatment methods include cognitive-behavioral therapy, relapse-prevention therapy, psychodynamic psychosocial therapy, and psychopharmacological treatment, which can be implemented through individual therapy, couple's therapy, and/or group therapy.

The concept of hypersexuality as an addiction was started in the 1970s by former members of Alcoholics Anonymous who felt they experienced a similar lack of control and compulsivity with sexual behaviors as with alcohol. Multiple 12-step style self-help groups now exist for people who identify as sex addicts, including Sex Addicts Anonymous, Sexaholics Anonymous, Sex and Love Addicts Anonymous, and Sexual Compulsives Anonymous. Some hypersexual men may treat their condition with the usage of medication (such as cyproterone acetate) or consuming foods considered to be anaphrodisiacs. Other hypersexuals may choose a route of consultation, such as psychotherapy, self-help groups or counselling.

== Terminology ==
Sexologists have been using the term hypersexuality since the late 1800s, when Krafft-Ebing described several cases of extreme sexual behaviors in his seminal 1886 book, Psychopathia Sexualis. The author used the term hypersexuality to describe conditions that would now be termed premature ejaculation. Terms to describe males with the condition include donjuanist, satyromaniac, satyriac and satyriasist, for women clitoromaniac, nympho and nymphomaniac, for teleiophilic (attracted to adults) heterosexual women andromaniac, while hypersexualist, sexaholic, onanist, hyperphiliac and erotomaniac are gender-neutral terms.

Other, mostly historical, names are the Messalina complex, sexaholism, hyperlibido and furor uterinus. John Wilmot, 2nd Earl of Rochester, described hypersexuality in some of his literature.

== See also ==
- Asexuality
- Erotophilia
- Paraphilia
- Persistent genital arousal disorder
- Pornography addiction
- Sexual Compulsivity Scale
