= Sexual Recovery Anonymous =

Twelve-step program

Sexual Recovery Anonymous (SRA), founded in 1990, is one of several twelve-step programs for the treatment of sexual addiction based on the original Twelve Steps of Alcoholics Anonymous. SRA takes its place among various 12-step groups that seek recovery from sexual addiction: Sex Addicts Anonymous, Sex and Love Addicts Anonymous, Sexual Compulsives Anonymous and Sexaholics Anonymous. Collectively these groups are referred to as "S" groups since all their acronyms begin with that letter. As of 2025, SRA has meetings in several US states, Mexico and Europe, with a concentration in and around New York. There is a related group called SRA-ANON for spouses, relatives, friends, and significant others of SRA members. This group is analogous to Al-Anon for family members of Alcoholics Anonymous (AA).

SRA was founded in 1990 as a "progressive offshoot" of Sexaholics Anonymous (SA). It is said to be "far more diverse" with a strong presence of women, African Americans, Asians, and members of the LGBT community. The direct reason for the split, and a main difference in the two fellowships, is that SRA allows sexual relations between two people in a “committed relationship”, while SA only allows a heterosexual spouse as an acceptable partner.

== See also ==
- Hypersexuality
- List of twelve-step groups
