= Fortify =

Fortify is a verb, meaning to build a fortification.

Fortify may also refer to:

== Computing and technology ==
- Fortify (Netscape), a software hack for the Netscape Navigator
- Fortify, a software tool used to format programs in the Fortress programming language for rendering by LaTeX
- Fortify Software, a software code analysis product
- Fortify, an app marketed by the anti-pornography organization Fight the New Drug which tracks the user’s masturbation habits
- Mobile Fortify, a mobile face recognition application used by United States Immigration and Customs Enforcement (ICE) agents

== Other uses ==
- Fortify, a construction project on Interstate 40 (North Carolina)

== See also ==
- Fortification (disambiguation)
- Fortified
- Fortress
