= Pornography addiction =

Compulsive sexual behaviour

Pornography addiction is the scientifically controversial application of an addiction model to the use of pornography. Pornography can be considered part of a compulsive behavior, with negative consequences for one's physical, mental, social, or financial well-being. While the World Health Organization's ICD-11 (2022) has recognized compulsive sexual behavior disorder (CSBD) as an impulse-control disorder, CSBD is not an addiction, and the American Psychiatric Association's DSM-5 and the DSM-5-TR do not classify compulsive pornography consumption as a mental disorder or a behavioral addiction.

Problematic Internet pornography viewing, also known as problematic pornography use (PPU), is the viewing of Internet pornography that is problematic for an individual due to personal or social reasons, including the excessive time spent viewing pornography instead of interacting with others and the facilitation of procrastination. Individuals may report depression, social isolation, career loss, decreased productivity, or financial consequences as a result of their excessive Internet pornography viewing, impeding their social lives. A causal relationship could never be shown.

== Diagnosis ==
Pornography addiction is often defined operationally by the frequency of pornography viewing and negative consequences. The only diagnostic criteria for a behavioral addiction in the DSM-5 are for pathological gambling, and they are similar to those for substance abuse and dependence, such as preoccupation with the behavior, diminished ability to control the behavior, tolerance, withdrawal, and adverse psychosocial consequences. Diagnostic criteria have been proposed for other behavioral addictions, and these are usually also based on established diagnoses for substance abuse and dependence.

A proposed diagnosis for hypersexual disorder includes pornography as a subtype of this disorder. It includes criteria such as time consumed by sexual activity interfering with obligations, repetitive engagement in sexual activity in response to stress, repeated failed attempts to reduce these behaviors, and distress or impairment of life functioning.

According to the American Society of Addiction Medicine, some psychological and behavioral changes characteristic of addiction brain changes include addictive cravings, impulsiveness, weakened executive function, desensitization, and dysphoria. BOLD fMRI results have shown that individuals diagnosed with compulsive sexual behavior (CSB) show enhanced cue reactivity in brain regions associated traditionally with drug-cue reactivity. These regions include the amygdala and the ventral striatum. Men without CSB who had a long history of viewing pornography exhibited a less intense response to pornographic images in the left ventral putamen, possibly suggestive of desensitization.

As of 2024, the position of the American Society of Addiction Medicine is that sexual addiction is not a recognized diagnosis.

Neuropsychopharmacological and psychological research on pornography addiction conducted between 2015 and 2021 have concluded that most studies have been focused entirely or almost exclusively on men in anonymous settings, and the findings are contradictory. Some researchers support the idea that pornography addiction qualifies as a form of behavioral addiction under the umbrella construct of hypersexual behavior or a subset of compulsive sexual behavior (CSB), and should be treated as such. Others have detected the increased activation of ventral striatal reactivity in men for cues predicting erotic but not monetary rewards and cues signaling erotic pictures, therefore suggesting similarities between pornography addiction and conventional addiction disorders.

Although pornography is being spuriously indicted as a public health crisis in the United States and elsewhere, with problematic Internet and online pornography use reported to constitute an increasing burden on public mental health since the 2000s, psychopathological models and diagnostic criteria have lacked consensus. The body of evidence on the effectiveness of therapeutic approaches is still scarce.

A 2016 systematic review found that studies have linked self-perceived pornography addiction (SPPA) to increased isolation and relationship breakdowns for both users and their partners. The researchers never say that it constitutes an official psychiatric disorder. Paula Hall (2018) supports the use of an addiction framework to understand and treat problematic pornography use, and she advocates for recognizing porn addiction as a legitimate clinical issue. Hunt (2024) stated that porn is part of culture, and therefore, it is difficult to tell what produces harm.

A 2024 review supports a diagnosis of pornography addiction as a public health crisis. It is based upon a page published by the American Psychiatric Association, which in its turn is based upon an MDPI paper, rather than upon the statistical processing of empirical data by the reviewers.

A 2025 systematic review of longitudinal studies on adolescent pornography use found heterogeneous results, with some studies indicating significant associations between pornography use and various outcomes (including sexual behaviors, sexual aggression, and life satisfaction), while other results were inconsistent. The review concluded that methodological differences in how pornography use and problematic pornography use (PPU) are defined and measured undermine its clinical relevance. That is, the existing evidence is of limited use in psychiatry (rather, it is inconclusive for an official diagnosis).

A 2025 public policy research, including about teenagers using pornographic media, says "The evidence to substantiate these assertions remains preliminary" (causality cannot be shown). That is, the existing evidence does not support public policy stances about how teenagers use media. However, the review did not concentrate upon pornography use, and just mentioned it passingly.

A 2026 systematic review found correlations between anxiety, depression, and pornography consumption, especially for young people, but causality cannot get established.

=== Diagnostic status ===
Pornography addiction is a controversial concept, since it appears to be "largely morally, ideologically, and politically motivated." Empirical support for it is largely missing and the "industry of porn/sex addiction is based on conservative moral values around sexuality that intrude into clinical practice". Julie Sale stated, "No one refutes that clients access therapy for help with sexual behaviours that they feel they have no control over. The issue is how these client experiences are conceptualised and how the clinical formulation informs treatment."

The status of pornography addiction as an addictive disorder, rather than simply a compulsivity, has been hotly contested. Furthermore, research suggests that the use of a pornography addiction label may indicate a socially (as opposed to clinically) driven nosology.

The Diagnostic and Statistical Manual of Mental Disorders, Fifth Edition (DSM-5) includes a new section for behavioral addictions, but includes only one disorder: pathological gambling. One other behavioral addiction, internet gaming disorder, appears in the conditions proposed for further study in DSM-5. Psychiatrists cited a lack of research support for refusing to include other behavioral disorders, such as pornography, at the time.

Porn addiction is not a diagnosis in DSM-5 (or any previous version). "Viewing pornography online" is mentioned verbatim in the DSM-5, but it is not considered a mental disorder either.

When the fifth edition of the Diagnostic and Statistical Manual of Mental Disorders (DSM-5) was being drafted, experts considered a proposed diagnostic addiction called hypersexual disorder, which also included a pornography subtype. But in the end, reviewers determined that there wasn't enough evidence to include hypersexual disorder or its subtypes in the 2013 edition.

— Kirsten Weir (2014), Is pornography addictive?

Some studies have found neurological markers of addiction in internet porn users, which is consistent with a large body of research finding similar markers in other kinds of problematic internet users. Yet other studies found that critical biomarkers of addiction were missing.

The International Classification of Disorders 11 (ICD-11) rejected "pornography addiction". Specifically, the World Health Organization (WHO) wrote: "Based on the limited current data, it would therefore seem premature to include [problematic Internet use] in ICD-11."

In November 2016, the American Association of Sexuality Educators, Counselors and Therapists (AASECT) issued a position statement on sex/porn addiction, which states that AASECT "does not find sufficient empirical evidence to support the classification of sex addiction or porn addiction as a mental health disorder, and does not find the sexual addiction training and treatment methods and educational pedagogies to be adequately informed by accurate human sexuality knowledge. Therefore, it is the position of AASECT that linking problems related to sexual urges, thoughts or behaviors to a porn/sexual addiction process cannot be advanced by AASECT as a standard of practice for sexuality education delivery, counseling or therapy."

It is worth considering whether the apparent epidemic of self-diagnosed pornography addicts seeking help today perhaps represents the ready uptake of a relatively new way to describe one's problematic behaviour, and not the development of a modern disease entity whose description should dictate its treatment.

— Kris Taylor (2019), Nosology and metaphor: How pornography viewers make sense of pornography addiction

A 2019 systematic review offers a mixed bag on whether it can be called an addiction.

However, ICD-11 does include the "Compulsive sexual behaviour disorder" (CSBD) in the "impulse control disorders" section. It is defined as "a persistent pattern of failure to control intense, repetitive sexual impulses or urges resulting in repetitive sexual behaviour." David J. Ley argued that this is not an endorsement of the concept of pornography addiction. ICD also specifically excludes anyone from this diagnosis whose distress is due to moral conflict alone, yet moral incongruence is the strongest predictor of believing one is addicted to porn. Note that two studies now contradict this, finding that narcissism, especially antagonistic narcissism, predicts identification as a pornography addict.

Introductory psychology textbook authors Coon, Mitterer, and Martini, passingly mentioning NoFap, speak of pornography as a "supernormal stimulus" but use the model of compulsion rather than addiction. Addiction and compulsion are models of mental disorders that cancel each other out, the term "addiction" being deprecated, but ICD-11 does not support the existence of "porn addiction"/"sex addiction".

DSM-5-TR, published in March 2022, does not recognize a diagnosis of sexual addiction/compulsion (which would include internet pornography viewing).

ICD-11 has added pornography to CSBD. However, this is categorized as an impulse control disorder, not an addictive disorder. It has been argued that the CSBD diagnosis is not based upon sex research.

Neither DSM-5, nor DSM-5-TR, nor ICD-10, nor ICD-11 recognize sex addiction or porn addiction as a valid diagnosis. Rothman has stated "pornography is not yet clearly established as a risk factor for multiple health outcomes".

The 2020 view about problematic pornography use (PPU) is that addiction is the wrong model for it.

However, pornography addiction is not presently considered a diagnosable condition according to the DSM. Alternatives to the DSM, such as the ICD-11, also have not subscribed to the addiction model for pornography, though they recognize that people may become compulsive about its use.

— Rothman 2021, p. 103

A 2022 book by McKee, Litsou, Byron, and Ingham casts serious doubts upon the model of "porn addiction", suggesting that sexual shame should be blamed, instead of pornography. They note that much of the research on the effects of pornography often confuses correlation with causation, and that much pornography research has been normative (i.e., moralistic) instead of descriptive.

Privara and Bob (2023) admit that pornography addiction is not a recognized diagnosis, they also say that narcissists who watch pornography tend to get a disapproving image of their own body, which would explain the rise in cosmetic surgery (such as labiaplasty). They argue that sexual addiction is strongly correlated with narcissism.

Even scientists who find a problem with excessive pornography consumption state that moderate pornography consumption is healthy. According to a 2024 book, "The truth is most sex therapists and educators do not prescribe to the idea of sex addiction." A 2026 narrative review discusses methodological issues; its results are speculative.

=== Compulsion vs. addiction ===
These findings do not mean people are faking a problem if they say they're having trouble with compulsive porn use. It means that addiction is the wrong treatment model for the problem. And, if compulsive porn use is not an addiction, yet is being handled as such, treatment providers could be harming patients, not helping them. A constructive alternative to the addiction model is to focus on sexual compulsivity, Prause suggests.

— Shira Tarrant (2016)

== Treatment ==
The most commonly researched interventions are psychological treatments, including acceptance and commitment therapy (ACT), cognitive behavioral therapy (CBT), Mindfulness-based relapse prevention, meditation, couple interventions, Cognitive analytic therapy, Non-blaming Chance and Action Approach, Structural family therapy, Couple therapy + individual therapy as well as mixed psychological approaches namely Brief internet-delivered intervention with the application of behavior change techniques, rTMS + Propranolol for social anxiety symptoms + Psychological counseling, Person-centered mixed psychotherapy approach (individual and in group, combining CBT + psychodynamic psychotherapy), Online self-help intervention, based on motivational interviewing, CBT, mindfulness and social psychological interventions, Eclectic-integrative psychotherapy. Pharmacological treatments included naltrexone, nalmefene, selective serotonin reuptake inhibitors (SSRIs) and serotonin–norepinephrine reuptake inhibitors (SNRIs). Several studies reported the use of a combination of psychological and pharmacological strategies (CBT with Fluoxentine/Paroxentine/Devenlafaxine/Naltrexone and Naltrexone with Fluvoxamine).

All of them were able to reduce or stop the consumption of pornography. Most treatments are based on case reports or quasi‑experimental studies, and are based on CBT; only online self‑help, Citalopram, Paroxetine, Naltrexone, and ACT were tested in randomized controlled trials. Evidence quality is generally low, focused mainly on cis‑heterosexual men, with limited reporting on side effects, among the reported ones are:

- CBT + Paroxetine (20 mg/day): temporary libido reduction and delayed ejaculation, resolved after ~10 weeks.
- Naltrexone: Treatment discontinued due to anhedonia
- Citalopram: frequent delayed ejaculation.
- Meditation: Some participants found it unpleasant.
- ACT (self‑help book): only ~50% completed; often considered too long or redundant.
- Online self‑help (MI, CBT, mindfulness): 11% dropout, declining module completion, but overall positive evaluations.
- Paroxetine + Naltrexone: some discontinued due to adverse effects of sedation (29% Paroxetine, 38% Naltrexone), weight gain (17%, 4%, 12% placebo), erectile dysfunction (13%, 0%, 8%), apathy (8% each), orgasmic dysfunction (3% Paroxetine). No serious medication‑related effects occurred.

Some clinicians and support organizations recommend voluntary use of Internet content-control software, internet monitoring, or both, to manage online pornography use. Sex researcher Alvin Cooper and colleagues suggested several reasons for using filters as a therapeutic measure, including curbing accessibility that facilitates problematic behavior and encouraging clients to develop coping and relapse prevention strategies. Cognitive therapist Mary Anne Layden suggested that filters may be useful in maintaining environmental control. Internet behavior researcher David Delmonico stated that, despite their limitations, filters may serve as a "frontline of protection."

A 2025 review favors CBT and ACT, but identified methodological issues and a high risk of bias. A 2026 systematic review has shown that CBT applied to PPU lacks scientific rigor.

== Prevalence ==
The prevalence rate of problematic pornography consumption ranges from 0.20% to 57.40%, with the overall prevalence rate being 13% and the prevalence rate taking publication bias into account being 8%. The prevalence rate varies by region. Asia has the highest prevalence rate 19%, followed by Europe 11%, North America 7%, and Australia 5%. Gender, age, and user type did not influence the prevalence rate, but the instruments used to assess problematic pornography consumption did have an influence: BPS had the highest prevalence rate, 21%, followed by PPCS-6, 16%, other psychometric instruments, 14%, PPCS, 12%, and ad hoc scales 6%.

== Society and culture ==
=== Support groups ===
Several support groups exist for people who wish to quit pornography use or believe themselves to be addicted to pornography. Twelve-step programs such as Sex Addicts Anonymous (SAA), Sexaholics Anonymous (SA), Sex and Love Addicts Anonymous (SLAA), Sexual Recovery Anonymous (SRA), and Sexual Compulsives Anonymous (SCA) are fellowships of men and women who share their experience, strength and hope with each other so they may overcome their common problem and help others recover from addiction or dependency by using the twelve-step program borrowed from Alcoholics Anonymous (AA) and other recovery tools.

NoFap is a website and community forum founded in 2011 that serves as a support group for those who wish to give up pornography and masturbation. It serves as a support group for those who wish to avoid the use of pornography, masturbation, or sexual intercourse. Recent peer-reviewed data highlighted considerable levels of misogyny along with a poor understanding of human sexuality and relationships within this online community. Sociologist Kelsy Burke, author of The Pornography Wars, believes that this misogyny arises from blaming the female-dominated profession of pornography for men's personal problems. The Daily Dot and Der Spiegel linked NoFap to recent gender-based murders and breeding domestic terrorism.

Fight the New Drug, a Salt Lake City-based non-profit organization founded by members of the Church of Jesus Christ of Latter-day Saints, is a non-legislative organization which claims to seek to inform and educate individuals regarding pornography usage with science and personal stories. It is aimed at the youth demographic. There is also a PornFree Reddit group that focuses on giving up porn rather than masturbation.

Celebrate Recovery is a Christian interdenominational twelve-step program with about 35,000 available groups and is open to anyone struggling with life's bad habits, hurts, and hang-ups. Celebrate Recovery was started in 1991 at Saddleback Church in California, and their program is based on the Beatitudes from the biblical Sermon on the Plain and the twelve-step program from Alcoholics Anonymous.

=== Religious and political factors ===
According to professor E. T. M. Laan, a sexologist working for the Academic Medical Center, it is usually the American religious right which claims the existence of pornography addiction, and such claims are rare (scarce) among sexologists. A 2018 meta-analysis showed a correlation between a person being religious and perceiving themself as having a pornography addiction, possibly due to people using pornography despite their religion prohibiting it.

According to Addicted to Lust: Pornography in the Lives of Conservative Protestants (2019) written by Samuel L. Perry, professor of sociology at the University of Oklahoma, conservative Protestants in the United States are characterized by a "sexual exceptionalism" related to their consumption of pornography due to certain pervasive beliefs within the Conservative Protestant subculture, which entails cognitive dissonance associated with the unfounded conviction to be addicted to pornography, psychological distress, and intense feelings of guilt, shame, self-loathing, depression, and sometimes withdrawal from faith altogether.

Perry's book received widespread media coverage and his findings were criticized by Lyman Stone of the Evangelical magazine Christianity Today, which asserted that both the quantitative and qualitative statistical data collected by Perry demonstrate that the consumption of pornography in the United States is significantly lower among church-attending Protestant Christians compared to other religious groups, and declared that "Protestant men today who attend church regularly are basically the only men in America still resisting the cultural norm of regularized pornography use".

The overwhelming majority of all websites and YouTube channels devoted to anti-masturbation and anti-porn addiction propaganda, channels and websites supporting NoFap included, are, according to various sources, owned by far-right Christian fundamentalists and conservative biblical inerrantists, and are also entirely political in nature. Various psychologists, medical doctors, and social scientists have contended that traditional Christian concerns over combating sexual thoughts, desires, and activities, including masturbation, can be seen as unhealthy and unwholesome. This may also apply to secular advocacy of anti-pornography and anti-masturbation, including 16 U.S. states' legislatures which have declared that pornography is a "public health crisis".

The American Psychiatric Association had by then already dismissed such moral panic ("political stunt") in DSM-5 (published in 2013), and DSM-5-TR, published in March 2022, does not recognize a diagnosis of sexual addiction (which would include internet pornography viewing).

Emily F. Rothman, professor of Community Health Sciences at the Boston University School of Public Health, stated in 2021 that "the professional public health community is not behind the recent push to declare pornography a public health crisis". The ideas supporting the "crisis" have been described as pseudoscientific.

Sexual violence, partner violence, anxiety, depression, compulsive pornography use, and commercial sexual exploitation are public health problems, and there is a possibility that pornography exacerbates these problems. Given that possibility, we need to know more about whether, how, and why pornography influences social norms as well as individuals' behavior, and what we can do to address that influence if it is harmful. It is also important to be aware that framing pornography as a public health issue has been used as a rhetorical trick by right-wing groups to promote a conservative social agenda at odds with public health goals. Public health professionals should sponsor rigorous research on the possible negative effects of pornography on society and individuals, counter misinformation, and use evidence to move forward with policy decisions.

— Rothman 2021, p. 14

In many cases, sexual addiction therapy applied to gay men is akin to conversion therapy.

According to a book published by the evangelical publisher Thomas Nelson, pornography addiction does exist.

Conservative Protestant men often claim to be porn addicts, even if their usage of pornography is very modest, while Christian nationalists are more likely than others to see themselves as pornography addicts.

=== Mainstream media ===
In 2013, American actor Joseph Gordon-Levitt wrote, directed, and starred in the comedy-drama film Don Jon, in which the protagonist is addicted to pornography. In an interview to promote the film, Gordon-Levitt discussed what he referred to as the "fundamental difference between a human being and an image on a screen".

In 2014, American actor Terry Crews talked about his long-standing pornography addiction, which he said had seriously affected his marriage and life and which he was able to overcome only after entering rehab in 2009. He now takes an active role in speaking out about pornography addiction and its impact.

In 2015, English comedian Russell Brand appeared in videos by American anti-pornography group Fight the New Drug, in which he discussed pornography and its harmful effects.

In 2016, American comedian Chris Rock and his wife, Malaak Compton, divorced after 20 years of marriage, which Rock attributed to his infidelity and pornography addiction. He later discussed the details of his pornography addiction in his 2018 stand-up comedy special Tamborine.

== See also ==
- Accountability software
- Anti-pornography movement
- Content-control software
- National Center on Sexual Exploitation
- Rational Recovery
- Sexaholics Anonymous
- Sex Addicts Anonymous
- Sexual Compulsives Anonymous
- Sex and Love Addicts Anonymous
