= Juanism =

Juanism may refer to:

- Support for Joanna la Beltraneja's claim to the Crown of Castile during the War of the Castilian Succession (1474–1479); supporters were called Juanistas ('Joanna' is Juana in Spanish), as opposed to Isabelistas supporting Isabella.
- Advocacy to enthrone Infante Juan, Count of Barcelona (1913–1993) as King of Spain, after his father Alfonso XIII of Spain was deposed and replaced by the Second Spanish Republic in 1931. An advocate was called a Juanista. Advocacy to restore Alfonso himself was called Alfonsism.
- Don Juanism or Don Juan syndrome, a non-clinical term for the desire, in a man, to have sex with many different female partners.
