= Robert Weiss (therapist) =

American psychologist

Dr. Robert Weiss LCSW CSAT
- Born: c. 1961
- Citizenship: USA
- Occupations: Expert in the treatment of sexual addiction, author, educator

Academic background
- Education: Emerson College, UCLA

Academic work
- Discipline: Addiction Specialist Intimacy and Sexual Disorders
- Institutions: Sexual Recovery Institute (SRI), Seeking Integrity
- Website: www.seekingintegrity.com

Robert Weiss (born c. 1961) is an American author, educator, and clinical expert in the treatment of Sexual Addiction and Related intimacy disorders. Weiss currently serves as Founder Seeking Integrity Treatment Programs.

== Background ==
Raised in Westchester County, NY and New York City, Weiss attended Tulane University in New Orleans and then went on to complete his undergraduate studies at Emerson College in Boston, Massachusetts. In 1992, he received an MSW from UCLA and was then invited to provide residential sexual disorders treatment in Los Angeles under the direction of Dr. Patrick Carnes. He received his LCSW in 1995 and earned his doctorate from The International Institute of Clinical Sexology in 2018.

== Work ==
Since the early 1990s, Weiss has been developing treatment programs on clinical education, therapy, and support to people affected by adult sexual disorders.

In 1995, Weiss founded the Sexual Recovery Institute (SRI), which offered intensive outpatient programs. In 2011, Weiss sold SRI to Elements Behavioral Health and became Elements' Senior Vice President of clinical development division. SRI finally closed its doors in 2015. In 2017, Weiss established Seeking Integrity, a clinic and treatment center providing recovery programs for sex addiction, porn addiction, and chemsex addiction, along with free information, videos, podcasts, blogs and more. In 2018, Compulsive Sexual Behavior Disorder (CSBD) was defined as a medical condition by the World Health Organization, which also announced it would include CSBD in the next edition of its diagnostic manual, the International Classification of Diseases (ICD-11), although "materials in ICD-11 make very clear that CSBD is not intended to be interchangeable with sex addiction, but rather is a substantially different diagnostic framework". As of 2021, Weiss was the chief clinical officer at Seeking Integrity Treatment Programs in Los Angeles. Dr. Weiss is a specialist in the field of sexual addiction. He also frequently serves as a subject-matter expert for media outlets including Larry King and Don Lemon's programs on CNN, Megyn Kelly Today NBC, HLN, The New York Times, and BBC, among others.

== Publications ==
- Schneider, Jennifer P; Weiss, Robert (2001). Cybersex Exposed: Simple Fantasy or Obsession?. Hazelden Information & Educational Services. ISBN 9781568386195. OCLC 45639054.
- Weiss, Robert (2005). Cruise Control: Understanding Sex Addiction in Gay Men. Alyson Books. ISBN 9781555838218. OCLC 57695041.
- Weiss, Robert; Schneider, Jennifer P (2006). Untangling the Web: Sex, Porn, and Fantasy Obsession in the Internet Age. Alyson Books. ISBN 9781555839680. OCLC 122259893.
- Weiss, Robert; Schneider, Jennifer P (2014). Closer Together, Further Apart: The Effect of Technology and the Internet on Parenting, Work, and Relationships. Gentle Path Press. ISBN 9780985063337. OCLC 812258551.
- Weiss, Robert; Schneider, Jennifer P (2015). Always Turned on: Facing Sex Addiction in the Digital Age. Gentle Path Press. ISBN 978-0985063368. OCLC 910729348.
- Weiss, Robert (2015). Sex Addiction 101: A Basic Guide to Healing from Sex, Love, and Porn Addiction.ISBN 9780757318436
- Weiss, Robert (2016). Out of the doghouse: A Step-by-step Relationship-saving Guide for Men Caught Cheating. Health Communications. ISBN 9780757319211. OCLC 1023814768.
- Weiss, Robert (2018). Prodependence: Moving Beyond Codependency. Health Communications. ISBN 9780757320354 OCLC 1022500041
- Weiss, Robert (2018) Sex Addiction 101, the Workbook: 24 Proven Exercises to Guide Sex Addiction Recovery. ISBN 978-1945330100

=== In co-authorship ===
- Weiss, R. (2002). Treatment concerns for gay male sex addicts. In P. Carnes & K. Adams (Eds.), Clinical management of sex addiction. New York, NY: Brunner-Routledge.
- Weiss, R. (2004). Understanding assessment, diagnosis, and treatment of sexual addiction. In R. Coombs (Ed.), Handbook of addictive disorders: A practical guide to diagnosis and treatment. New York, NY: Wiley.
- Weiss, R. (2009). Understanding sexual offending. In A. Neustein (Ed.), Tempest in the temple: Jewish communities and child sex scandals. Waltham, MA: Brandeis.
- Weiss, R. (2011). How does sex addiction and infidelity affect gay couples? (for partners in same-sex relationships). In S. Carnes (Ed.), Mending a shattered heart: A guide for partners of sex addicts. Carefree, AZ: Gentle Path Press.
