= Gary Wilson (writer) =

American writer (1956–2021)

Gary Bruce Wilson (May 12, 1956 – May 20, 2021) was an American writer and anti-pornography campaigner.

== Biography ==
Wilson was a writer who lived in Ashland, Oregon. He studied for a nursing and physican's assistant degree, but did not complete either program due to health issues. He was formerly an adjunct professor of biology at Southern Oregon University and also taught at vocational schools. Together with his wife, Marnia Robinson, he was an instructor of karezza, and the couple shared an antipathy towards orgasms. He became widely known from his 2012 TEDx talk entitled "The Great Porn Experiment" in which he argued exposure to pornography changes brain chemistry. The talk has been viewed over 17 million times.

Wilson started the website YourBrainOnPorn.com with his wife which argues that pornography is an addiction the same as overeating or compulsive gambling. Four years after the site's launch, he published the book Your Brain On Porn: Internet Pornography and the Emerging Science of Addiction, on the same topic and had it translated into Arabic, Dutch, German, Hungarian, Japanese, and Russian.

Wilson co-authored a study which concluded rates of impotence among young men have increased since the introduction of internet pornography. The journal later issued a correction with an addition to the conflict of interest section.

Wilson died by suicide on May 20, 2021, after years of illness.

== Views and reception ==
Wilson argued, counter to some experts in the subject, that porn addiction is a public health issue, and said it led to negative effects such as depression and erectile dysfunction. This gist of his argument is the Coolidge effect (desensitization due to seeing many new naked bodies), but scholars have expressed doubts that it applies to humans.

Wilson's material prominently undergirds the internet fads "NoFap" and "No Nut November", with his TED-X talk often linked in relevant fora in spite of the note posted by TED at the top of the recording: “This talk contains several assertions that are not supported by academically respected studies in medicine and psychology. While some viewers might find advice provided in this talk to be helpful, please do not look to this talk for medical advice.”

According to historian Brian M. Watson, Wilson, "with no scientific training or background ... has made a career peddling pseudoscience." Social sciences lecturer Jonny Hunt said that Wilson "has no scientific or academic qualification and has never published any peer-reviewed research anywhere in the world." According to Jason Winters, a lecturer on human sexuality, "Wilson is simply presenting his ideology as fact, and in this case, it's dangerous."

At the opposite end of the spectrum, Paula Hall has praised Wilson's insights about addiction.

== Publications ==
- Wilson, Gary (2015). Your Brain on Porn: Internet Pornography and the Emerging Science of Addiction. Commonwealth Publishing. ISBN 978-0993161605.
