= Internet sex addiction =

Behavioral addiction

Internet sex addiction, also known as cybersex addiction, has been proposed as a sexual addiction characterized by virtual Internet sexual activity that causes serious negative consequences to one's physical, mental, social, and/or financial well-being. It may also be considered a subset of the theorized Internet addiction disorder. Internet sex addiction manifests various behaviours: reading erotic stories; viewing, downloading or trading online pornography; online activity in adult fantasy chat rooms; cybersex relationships; masturbation while engaged in online activity that contributes to one's sexual arousal; the search for offline sexual partners and information about sexual activity.

Internet sex addiction can have several causes according to the American Association for Sex Addiction Therapy. The first cause is the neural physiological attachment that occurs during orgasms - reinforcing and attaching the images or scenarios to the addictive behavior concurrently. Secondly, psychological defects like abandonment, unimportance or lack of genuine attachment are sometimes medicated by the instances of sex addiction behavior. Thirdly, the internet sex addict may be using the addiction to balance a legitimate chemical imbalance due to major depression, a bipolar disorder or a manic depressive disorder. The cybersex addict may also struggle with intimacy anorexia since the cyber world feels safer than real relationships.

== General ==
Cybersex addiction is a form of sexual addiction and Internet addiction disorder. As a form of a compulsive behavior, it can be identified by three criteria: the failure of making a decision about engagement in the behavior, obsession with the behavior, and the inability to stop the behavior despite negative consequences.

Adults with this type of addiction engage in at least one of the relevant behaviors. The majority of reasons why individuals experiment with such forms of sexual expression are diverse, and can be associated with an individual's psychological disorders or issues. Individuals who suffer from low self-esteem, severely distorted body image, untreated sexual dysfunction, social isolation, depression, or are in recovery from a prior sexual addiction are more vulnerable to cybersexual addictions. Other psychological issues that may arise with this addiction include struggles for intimacy, self-worth, self-identity, self-understanding.

The impact of cybersex addiction may also impact the spouse, partner or others in relationships with the addict. The resulting effects on others may include depression, weight gain and lower self-esteem. If cyber sex addicts have children, their actions may also impact those children (whether they are grown adult children or younger dependents).

== DSM classification ==
There is an ongoing debate in the medical community concerning the insufficient studies, and of those, their quality, or lack thereof, and the resulting analysis and conclusions drawn from them, such as they are. So far, without repeatable, meaningful, measurable, and quantifiable analysis, no medical community wide acceptably reasonable standards, a definition, have been drawn yet.

Hence, internet sex addiction, just like its umbrella sexual addiction, is still not listed in the DSM-5, which is commonly used by psychiatrists in the United States for diagnosing patients problems in a standard uniform way.

== See also ==
- Behavioral modernity
- Evolutionary mismatch
- Internet pornography
- Pornography addiction
