= Compulsive sexual behaviour disorder =

Mental disorder

- Specialty: Psychiatry
- Duration: ≥ 6 months

Compulsive sexual behaviour disorder (CSBD) is a psychiatric disorder which manifests as a pattern of behavior involving intense preoccupation with sexual fantasies and behaviours that cause significant levels of mental distress, cannot be voluntarily curtailed, and risk or cause harm to oneself or others. This disorder can also cause impairment in social, occupational, personal, or other important functions. CSBD is not an addiction, and is typically used to describe behaviour, rather than "sexual addiction".

CSBD is recognised by the World Health Organization (WHO) as an impulse-control disorder in the ICD-11. In contrast, the American Psychiatric Association's (APA) DSM-5 does not recognise CSBD as a standalone diagnosis. CSBD was proposed as a diagnosis for inclusion in the DSM-5 in 2010, but was ultimately rejected.

Sexual behaviours such as chemsex and paraphilias are closely related with CSBD and frequently co-occur along with it. Mental distress entirely related to moral judgments and disapproval about sexual impulses, urges, or behaviours is not sufficient to diagnose CSBD. A study conducted in 42 countries found that almost 5% of people may be at high risk of CSBD, but only 14% of them have sought treatment. The study also highlighted the need for more inclusive research and culturally-sensitive treatment options for CSBD.

== Diagnosis ==
=== ICD-11 ===
ICD-11 includes a diagnosis for compulsive sexual behaviour disorder (CSBD). CSBD is not an addiction.

=== DSM-5 ===
DSM-5 and DSM-5-TR have no such diagnosis.

== Treatment ==
=== Medications ===
As of end of 2019, the US Food and Drug Administration (FDA) had approved no medications for CSBD.

=== Cognitive–behavioural perspective ===
Some treatment guides suggest shame at the core of CSBD mechanism. The shame is associated with the cognitive schema of self-defectiveness and a feeling of social pain and isolation, and it functions in two ways. Firstly, chronic shame derived from social stigma or early traumatic experiences augments the soothing function of sexual behaviour. That makes sexual behaviour compulsive. Secondly, excessive or inappropriate sexual behaviour, as it is considered socially unacceptable, causes extra shame and forms a self-sustaining cycle of CSBD. Therefore, treatment is primarily aimed at shame reduction and social reintegration.

== History ==
The DSM-IV-TR, published in 2000, includes an entry called "Sexual Disorder—Not Otherwise Specified" (Sexual Disorder NOS), for disorders that are clinically significant but do not have code. The DSM-IV-TR notes that Sexual Disorder NOS would apply to, among other conditions, "distress about a pattern of repeated sexual relationships involving a succession of lovers who are experienced by the individual only as things to be used".

Hypersexual disorder was initially proposed as a diagnosis in 2010 and was recommended for inclusion in the DSM-5 by the Sexual and Gender Identity Disorders Workgroup (Emerging Measures and Models, Conditions for Further Study). It was ultimately rejected. The term hypersexual disorder was reportedly chosen because it did not imply any specific theory for the causes of hypersexuality, which remain unknown. A proposal to add sexual addiction to the DSM system had been previously rejected by the APA, as not enough evidence suggested to them that the condition is analogous to substance addictions, as that name would imply.

Rory Reid, a research psychologist in the Department of Psychiatry at the University of California Los Angeles (UCLA), led a team of researchers to investigate the proposed criteria for Hypersexual Disorder. Their findings were published in the Journal of Sexual Medicine where they concluded that the given criteria are valid and the disorder could be reliably diagnosed.

== See also ==
- Don Juanism
- Klüver–Bucy syndrome
- Persistent genital arousal disorder
- Pornography addiction
- Sexual obsessions
