= Behavioral addiction =

Compulsion to engage in a non-substance related behavior

Behavioral addiction, process addiction, or non-substance-related disorder is a form of addiction that involves a compulsion to engage in a rewarding non-substance-related behavior – sometimes called a natural reward – despite any negative consequences to the person's physical, mental, social or financial well-being. In the brain's reward system, a gene transcription factor known as ΔFosB has been identified as a necessary common factor involved in both behavioral and drug addictions, which are associated with the same set of neural adaptations.

Addiction traditionally refers to substance abuse, wherein the user develops a physical dependence; however, since the 1990s the term's colloquial connotation has expanded to include behaviors and experiences that may trigger the brain's reward system (such as gambling, eating, or shopping).

In addition, modern brain scan technologies have suggested that chemical and experience rewards have virtually identical reactions on the organ. Through this reward system, the brain becomes vulnerable to the possible risk of being trapped in compulsions. Such findings imply that addiction may be partially based on behavior rather than solely on chemical processes, given the fact that some behaviors can also have negative impacts on an individual’s brain. Still, the framework to diagnose and categorize behavioral addiction is a controversial topic in the psychopathology field.

== Psychiatric and medical classifications ==
Diagnostic and Statistical Manual of Mental Disorders (DSM) recognized behavioral addictions for the first time in the DSM-5 with gambling disorder, formerly called pathological gambling, as the only non-substance-related disorder classified under the chapter of "Substance-Related and Addictive Disorders". Internet gaming addiction was included in the appendix as a condition for further study. Although the term addiction is commonly used in nonmedical settings to describe repetitive harmful behavior, the DSM-5 recommended the more neutral term disorder instead of addiction in clinical settings to avoid uncertain definitions and potentially negative connotations. Previously proposed revisions for the DSM-5 have included the removal of "binge eating disorder" from the DSM-IV appendix and creating a diagnosis in the eating disorders category. The possible implementation of a near equivalent to "sex addiction" in the form of the new diagnosis of "hypersexual disorder" being added to the sexual disorder section was also proposed.

Similar to the changes in DSM-5, the eleventh revision of the International Classification of Diseases (ICD-11) introduced the category "Disorders due to substance use or addictive behaviours", based on the diagnostic framework of impaired control, repetitive harmful behavior, and continuation or escalation despite negative consequences. The new sub-category "Disorders due to addictive behaviours" included gambling disorder (formerly under the habit and impulse disorders), gaming disorder (a new diagnosis), and two residual categories (other specified and unspecified) to raise attention among clinicians and the public and to facilitate further research.

The American Society of Addiction Medicine (ASAM) defines addiction as including both substance use and compulsive behaviors, stating: "addiction is a treatable, chronic medical disease involving complex interactions among brain circuits, genetics, the environment, and an individual's life experiences. People with addiction use substances or engage in behaviors that become compulsive and often continue despite harmful consequences."

Other addictive behaviors which have received research attention but with insufficient or inconclusive scientific evidence include pornography use disorder, compulsive buying disorder, social network use disorder, work addiction, exercise addiction, compulsive sexual behavior disorder, and food addiction.

== Types ==
=== Exercise addiction ===
Exercise addiction is a state characterized by a compulsive engagement in any form of physical exercise, despite negative consequences. While regular exercise is generally a healthy activity, exercise addiction generally involves performing excessive amounts of exercise to the detriment of physical health, spending too much time exercising to the detriment of personal and professional life, and exercising regardless of physical injury. It may also involve a state of dependence upon regular exercise which involves the occurrence of severe withdrawal symptoms when the individual is unable to exercise. Differentiating between addictive and healthy exercise behaviors is difficult but there are key factors in determining which category a person may fall into. Exercise addiction shows a high comorbidity with eating disorders.

Exercise addiction is not listed as a disorder in the fourth revision of the Diagnostic and Statistical Manual of Mental Disorders (DSM-IV). This type of addiction can be classified under a behavioral addiction in which a person's behavior becomes obsessive, compulsive, or causes dysfunction in a person's life.

=== Gambling addiction ===
Problem gambling, ludopathy or ludomania is repetitive gambling behavior despite harm and negative consequences. Problem gambling may be diagnosed as a mental disorder according to DSM-5 if certain diagnostic criteria are met. Pathological gambling is a common disorder associated with social and family costs. Estimates suggest the affected global population is between 0.1% and 6%.

The DSM-5 has re-classified the condition as an addictive disorder, with those affected exhibiting many similarities to those with substance addictions. The term gambling addiction has long been used in the recovery movement. Pathological gambling was long considered by the American Psychiatric Association to be an impulse-control disorder rather than an addiction. However, data suggests a closer relationship between pathological gambling and substance use disorders than exists between PG and obsessive–compulsive disorder, mainly because the behaviors in problem gambling and most primary substance use disorders (i.e., those not resulting from a desire to "self-medicate" for another condition such as depression) seek to activate the brain's reward mechanisms, while the behaviors characterizing obsessive-compulsive disorder are prompted by overactive and misplaced signals from the brain's fear mechanisms.

Problem gambling is an addictive behavior with a high comorbidity with alcohol problems.

=== Internet addiction ===
Internet addiction disorder (IAD), also called problematic Internet use (PIU), is characterized by excessive or poorly controlled preoccupations, urges, or behaviors regarding computer use and Internet access that lead to impairment or distress. There is concern that increased access to the Internet among young people may cause students' academic performance to decline. Some experience health consequences from loss of sleep as they stay up to continue scrolling, chatting, and gaming.

The increase in Internet access in 16-19 year olds living in EU countries

Excessive Internet use is not recognized as a disorder by the American Psychiatric Association's DSM-5 or the World Health Organization's ICD-11. Controversy around the diagnosis includes whether the disorder is a separate clinical entity, or a manifestation of other underlying psychiatric disorders. Definitions are not standardized or agreed upon, complicating the development of evidence-based recommendations.

Many different theoretical models have been developed and employed for many years in order to better explain predisposing factors to this disorder. Models such as the cognitive-behavioral model of pathological Internet have been used to explain IAD for more than 20 years. Newer models, such as the Interaction of Person-Affect-Cognition-Execution model, have been developed more recently and are starting to be applied in more clinical studies.

In 2011 the term "Facebook addiction disorder" (FAD) emerged. FAD is characterized by compulsive use of Facebook. A 2017 study investigated a correlation between excessive use and narcissism, reporting "FAD was significantly positively related to the personality trait narcissism and to negative mental health variables (depression, anxiety, and stress symptoms)".

Additionally in 2020, studies have shown that there has been an increase in the prevalence of IAD since the COVID-19 pandemic. Studies highlighting the possible relationship between COVID-19 and IAD have looked at how forced isolation and its associated stress may have led to higher usage levels of the Internet.

Turning off social media notifications may help reduce social media use. For some users, changes in web browsing can be helpful in compensating for self-regulatory problems. For instance, a study involving 157 online learners on massive open online courses examined the impact of such an intervention. The study reported that providing support in self-regulation was associated with a reduction in time spent online, particularly on entertainment.

Internet addiction has also been suggested to have negative effects and lead to harmful behavior in circumstances in which overuse or misuse of technology is present. In terms of stability and change regarding internet addiction, the relationship between psychological well-being and internet use has been suggested to change over time depending on age. Internet addiction rates have also been on the rise, becoming a public health concern among young adults, specifically in association with mental health disturbances in college students.

Research has additionally categorized patterns of internet addiction as general or more specific in terms of internet applications, suggesting that certain applications may be predictors of internet addiction.

=== Pornography addiction ===
Pornography addiction is the scientifically controversial application of an addiction model to the use of pornography. Pornography can be considered part of a compulsive behavior, with negative consequences for one's physical, mental, social, or financial well-being. While the World Health Organization's ICD-11 (2022) has recognized compulsive sexual behavior disorder (CSBD) as an impulse-control disorder, CSBD is not an addiction, and the American Psychiatric Association's DSM-5 and the DSM-5-TR do not classify compulsive pornography consumption as a mental disorder or a behavioral addiction.

Problematic Internet pornography viewing, also known as problematic pornography use (PPU), is the viewing of Internet pornography that is problematic for an individual due to personal or social reasons, including the excessive time spent viewing pornography instead of interacting with others and the facilitation of procrastination. Individuals may report depression, social isolation, career loss, decreased productivity, or financial consequences as a result of their excessive Internet pornography viewing, impeding their social lives. A causal relationship could never be shown.

=== Sexual addiction ===
Sexual addiction is a state characterized by compulsive participation or engagement in sexual activity, particularly sexual intercourse, despite negative consequences. The concept is contentious; as of 2026, sexual addiction is not a clinical diagnosis in either the DSM or ICD medical classifications of diseases and medical disorders, the latter of which instead classifies such behaviors as a part of compulsive sexual behavior disorder (CSBD).

There is considerable debate among psychiatrists, psychologists, sexologists, and other specialists whether compulsive sexual behavior constitutes an addiction – in this instance a behavioral addiction – and therefore its classification and possible diagnosis. Animal research has established that compulsive sexual behavior arises from the same transcriptional and epigenetic mechanisms that mediate drug addiction in laboratory animals. Some argue that applying such concepts to normal behaviors such as sex can be problematic, and suggest that applying medical models such as addiction to human sexuality can serve to pathologise normal behavior and cause harm.

Some research has discussed the term of “internet sex addiction” as a way to define a medium of expression in which anonymity and disinhibition increase excessive participation in online sexual behaviors, though there is not much data to back this claim it is still believed that such a condition does exists and needs further study.

Further perspectives on sex addiction have suggested that it is a social construction which only becomes harmful when it is perceived and defined as a problem of sexual ambivalence, implying that it should not be classified as a medical disorder.

=== Shopping addiction ===
Shopping addiction is characterized by an eagerness to purchase unnecessary or superfluous things and a lack of impulse control when it comes to shopping. It is a concept similar to compulsive buying disorder (oniomania), but usually has a more psychosocial perspective, or is viewed as a drug-free addiction like addiction to gambling, Internet, or video games. However, there is "still debate on whether other less recognized forms of impulsive behaviors, such as compulsive buying [...] can be conceptualized as addictions."

=== Video game addiction ===
Video game addiction (VGA), also known as gaming disorder or internet gaming disorder, is generally defined as a behavioural addiction involving problematic, compulsive use of video games that results in significant impairment to an individual's ability to function in various life domains over a prolonged period of time. This and associated concepts have been the subject of considerable research, debate, and discussion among experts in several disciplines and has generated controversy within the medical, scientific, and gaming communities. Such disorders can be diagnosed when an individual engages in gaming activities at the cost of fulfilling daily responsibilities or pursuing other interests without regard for the negative consequences. As defined by the ICD-11, the main criterion for this disorder is a lack of self-control over gaming.

The World Health Organization (WHO) included gaming disorder in the 11th revision of its International Classification of Diseases (ICD). The American Psychiatric Association, while stating that there is insufficient evidence for the inclusion of internet gaming disorder as an officially recognized disorder in the fifth edition (DSM-5) of the Diagnostic and Statistical Manual of Mental Disorders published in 2013, considered it worthy of further study, thus including it in its chapter on Conditions for Further Study.

Controversy around the diagnosis includes whether the disorder is a separate clinical entity or a manifestation of underlying psychiatric disorders. Research has approached the question from a variety of viewpoints, with no universally standardized or agreed definitions, leading to difficulties in developing evidence-based recommendations.

Internet gaming disorder (IGD) affects an estimated 5% of the global population.

Multiplayer games are created in a way to encourage engagement which can be a positive experience, but it can negatively affect individuals with low self-esteem and real-world problems such as unfulfilled needs in the way of connecting with other individuals. Intervention strategies that are proposed to treat gaming addiction include support groups and screening instruments such as Young’s Diagnostic Questionnaire and the On-Line Gamers Anonymous Web site.

The question of whether gaming addiction is truly an addiction is still relevant, as the way it is defined is still being developed to understand how much attention should be given to the condition.

=== Work addiction ===
A workaholic is a person who works compulsively. A workaholic experiences an inability to limit the amount of time they spend on work despite negative consequences such as damage to their relationships or health.

There is no generally accepted medical definition of this condition, although some forms of stress, impulse control disorder, obsessive–compulsive personality disorder, and obsessive–compulsive disorder can be work-related; ergomania is defined as "excessive devotion to work especially as a symptom of mental illness".

The phenomenon of hustle culture, while disregarding healthy work–life balance, may exacerbate workaholism.

== Treatment ==
Behavioral addiction is a treatable condition. Treatment options include psychotherapy and psychopharmacotherapy (i.e., medications) or a combination of both. Cognitive behavioral therapy (CBT) is the most common form of psychotherapy used in treating behavioral addictions; it focuses on identifying patterns that trigger compulsive behavior and making lifestyle changes to promote healthier behaviors. Because cognitive behavioral therapy is considered a short-term therapy, the number of sessions for treatment normally ranges from five to twenty. During the session, therapists will lead patients through the topics of identifying the issue, becoming aware of one's thoughts surrounding the issue, identifying any negative or false thinking, and reshaping said negative and false thinking. While CBT does not cure behavioral addiction, it does help with coping with the condition in a healthy way. Currently, there are no medications approved for treatment of behavioral addictions in general, but some medications used for treatment of drug addiction may also be beneficial with specific behavioral addictions.

Another form of treatment is recreational therapy. A Certified Therapeutic Recreation Specialist (CTRS) uses leisure and recreation to help individuals recover from their injuries, ailments, or addictions. Therapeutic recreation can help an individual struggling with addiction to improve their self-esteem, confidence, motivation, resiliency, autonomy, enjoyment, and overall emotional state.

== Research ==
The classification and diagnostic framework of behavioral addictions under DSM-5 and ICD-11 has been a controversial subject among the clinical research field. For example, this 2020 narrative review considered ICD-11's guidelines to be adequate to include more behavioral addictions based on clinical relevance and empirical evidence, while this 2015 journal article questioned the atheoretical and confirmatory research approaches on the accuracy of qualitative factors and criticized the lack of consideration of social elements and psychological processes.

A recent narrative review in 2017 examined the existing literature for studies reporting associations between behavioral addictions (e.g., pathological gambling, problematic internet use, problematic online gaming, compulsive sexual behavior disorder, compulsive buying, and exercise addiction) and psychiatric disorders. Overall, there is solid evidence for associations between behavioral addictions and mood disorders, anxiety disorders, as well as substance use disorders. Associations between ADHD may be specific to problematic internet use and problematic online gaming. The authors also conclude that most of current research on the association between behavioral addictions and psychiatric disorders has several limitations: they are mostly cross-sectional, are not from representative samples, and are often based on small samples, among others. Especially more longitudinal studies are needed to establish the direction of causation, i.e. whether behavioral addictions are a cause or a consequence of psychiatric disorders.

A systematic review in 2021 investigating the correlation between autism and behavioral addiction found inconclusive evidence for a general correlation. However found evidence of correlation when comorbid mental health conditions were present. Another systematic review in 2022 estimating the prevalence of behavioural addiction during the COVID-19 pandemic found the prevalence to be 11.1%.

== Behavioral addiction and the brain ==
Several recently published studies have investigated potential brain abnormalities associated with behavioral addiction. A 2024 meta-analysis of neuroimaging studies related to specific types of behavioral addiction aimed to distinguish whether subtypes of behavioral addiction share a common neural basis. It found that research subjects affected by various behavioral addictions demonstrate similarities in the role of the frontostriatal circuits. Findings confirmed previous studies, highlighting the role of hyperactivation in the bilateral caudate nucleus, a part of the basal ganglia. Likewise, hyperactivation of the right inferior frontal gyrus (IFG) and left middle frontal gyrus (MFG), both located in the brain's frontal lobe, was observed.

A similar 2024 meta-analysis likewise identified abnormalities in cortical thickness among subjects affected by differing behavioral addictions. These subjects were noted to have a thinner cerebral cortex than individuals without behavioral addiction. Areas of the cerebral cortex affected were specifically the precuneus, postcentral gyrus, orbital-frontal cortex, and dorsolateral prefrontal cortex. An association between these areas and specific genes thought to be involved in dopamine metabolism and behavioral regulation was identified, the most significant of which was the dopamine D2 receptor. Additionally, researchers found that increased severity of behavioral addiction was linked to increased thinning of the cerebral cortex within the precuneus and postcentral gyrus.

Likewise, a 2023 meta-analysis found that subjects affected by differing behavioral addictions demonstrated similarities in gray matter volume, specifically a marked loss of gray matter volume in the anterior cingulate cortex, middle cingulate cortex, and superior frontal gyrus. This decrease in gray matter volume is associated with a decrease in brain connectivity. The meta-analysis suggests that this lack of gray matter could be associated with behavioral aspects of behavioral addiction, such as inhibition.

== Addiction and the reward system ==
ΔFosB, a gene transcription factor, has been identified as playing a critical role in the development of addictive states in both behavioral addictions and drug addictions. Overexpression of ΔFosB in the nucleus accumbens is necessary and sufficient for many of the neural adaptations seen in drug addiction; it has been implicated in addictions to alcohol, cannabinoids, cocaine, nicotine, phenylcyclidine, and substituted amphetamines as well as addictions to natural rewards such as sex, exercise, and food. A recent study also demonstrated a cross-sensitization between drug reward (amphetamine) and a natural reward (sex) that was mediated by ΔFosB.

One of the major areas of study is the amygdala, a brain structure which involves emotional significance and associated learning. Research shows that dopaminergic projections from the ventral tegmental area facilitate a motivational or learned association to a specific behavior. Dopamine neurons take a role in the learning and sustaining of many acquired behaviors. Research specific to Parkinson's disease has led to identifying the intracellular signaling pathways that underlie the immediate actions of dopamine. The most common mechanism of dopamine is to create addictive properties along with certain behaviors. There are three stages to the dopamine reward system: bursts of dopamine, triggering of behavior, and further impact to the behavior. Once electronically signaled, possibly through the behavior, dopamine neurons let out a 'burst-fire' of elements to stimulate areas along fast transmitting pathways. The behavior response then perpetuates the striated neurons to further send stimuli. The fast firing of dopamine neurons can be monitored over time by evaluating the amount of extracellular concentrations of dopamine through micro dialysis and brain imaging. This monitoring can lead to a model in which one can see the multiplicity of triggering over a period of time. Once the behavior is triggered, it is hard to work away from the dopamine reward system.

Behaviors like gambling have been linked to the newfound idea of the brain's capacity to anticipate rewards. The reward system can be triggered by early detectors of the behavior, and trigger dopamine neurons to begin stimulating behaviors. But in some cases, it can lead to many issues due to error, or reward-prediction errors. These errors can act as teaching signals to create a complex behavior task over time.

== See also ==
- Addictive behavior
- Addictive personality
- ANKK1 § Addictive behaviors
- Habit
