= Fight the New Drug =

American anti-pornography nonprofit organization

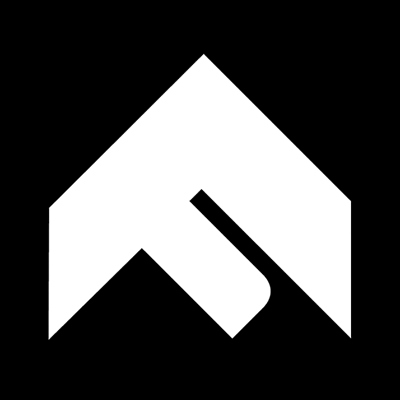
- Formation: 2009; 17 years ago
- Legal status: 501(c)(3) organization
- Headquarters: Salt Lake City, Utah, United States
- Website: fightthenewdrug.org

Fight the New Drug (FTND) is an American nonprofit and non-legislative anti-pornography organization based in Utah. The group, which was founded by Mormon activists, has roots dating back to 2006, being incorporated in 2008 and receiving nonprofit status in March 2009. FTND describes pornography as analogous to a drug and argues that it is a public health issue.

== Activities ==
The group works with people aged 18 to 24 through presentations and video campaigns, and student outreach activities in public school districts within Utah. In a 2015 campaign, FTND posted 100 billboards in the San Francisco Bay Area stating, "Porn Kills Love". In March 2018, the Kansas City Royals held a FTND anti-pornography seminar for players during their spring training, and in November of that year, FTND released a three-part documentary film entitled Brain, Heart, World. In addition, the group promotes its campaign via a social media presence, branded merchandise, such as T-shirts, and marketing kits.

== Reception ==
Clinical psychologist David J. Ley described the group's stance as "morally-laden pseudoscience". FTND has been described as holding an "openly ideology-driven strategy" and the group's message, in particular its categorizing of porn as a drug, as pseudoscience, contradictory to neuroscience research. The group have been described as an example of continued influence by members of the Church of Jesus Christ of Latter-day Saints over social issues. An example is their use of billboards in San Francisco to intentionally target a socially progressive region. In a Salt Lake Tribune op-ed, a group of sex therapists said that FTND's leaders and presenters were not mental health or sexuality professionals, and were promoting false information and failing to educate children about either sexuality and human development, or the positive, as well as the negative, aspects of porn.

Researchers analyzing FTND's claims have stressed that pornography addiction is not a recognized diagnosis, and that the declaration about pornography as a health crisis made by the state of Utah lacks scientific evidence.
