= Nicole Prause =

American neuroscientist

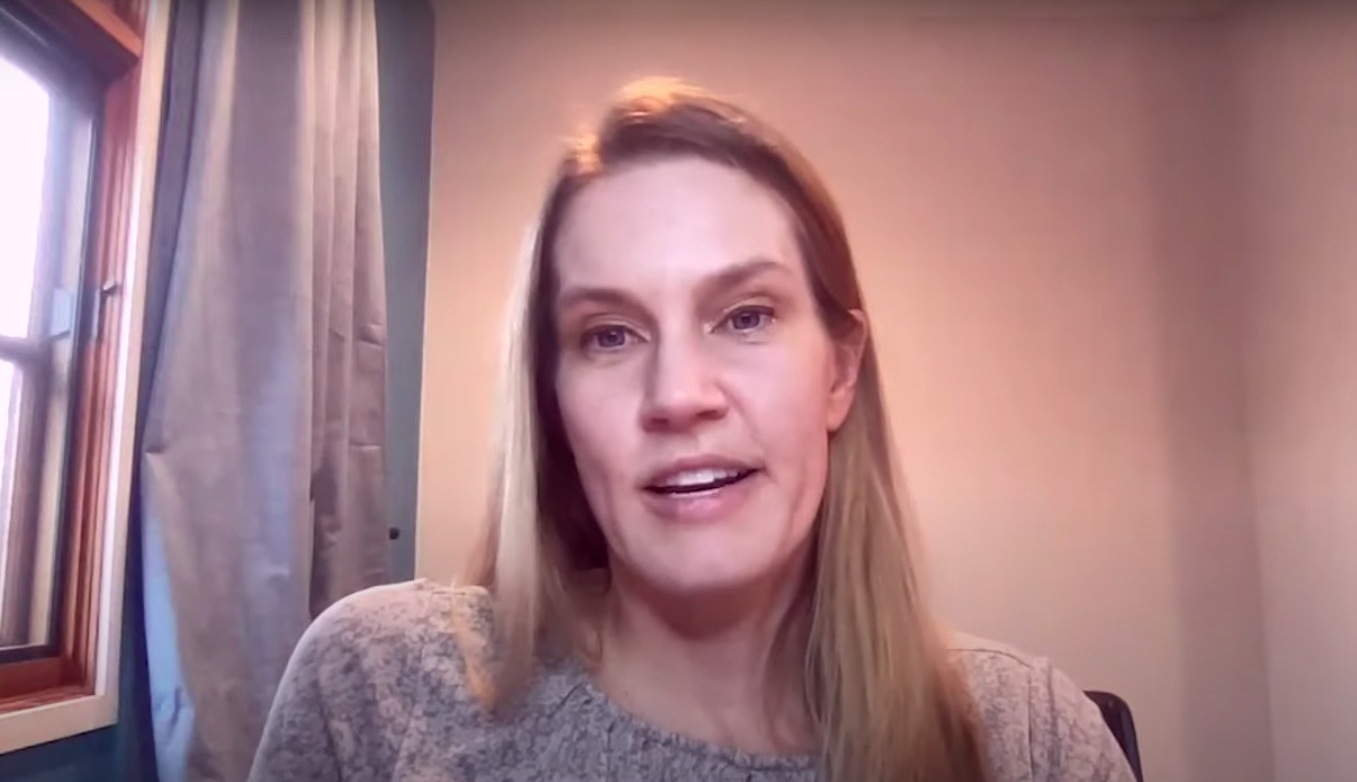
- Nicole Prause 2022.
- Born: 1978; Houston, Texas, U.S.
- Education: Indiana University Bloomington (BA, 2000; PhD, 2007)
- Known for: Studies on sexual addictions, orgasm physiology, and biosignal processing
- Scientific career
- Fields: Sexual physiology and biotechnology
- Workplaces: Liberos LLC, Mind Research Network

Nicole Prause is an American neuroscientist researching human sexual behavior, addiction, and the physiology of sexual response. She is also the founder of Liberos LLC, an independent research institute.

== Education and career ==
Prause obtained her doctorate in 2007 at Indiana University Bloomington, with joint supervision by the Kinsey Institute for Research in Sex, Gender, and Reproduction. Her areas of concentration were neuroscience and statistics. Her clinical internship, in neuropsychological assessment and behavioral medicine, was with the VA Boston Healthcare System's Psychology Internship Training Program. (Note: At the time, known as the Boston Consortium in Clinical Psychology) Her research fellowship was in couples' treatment for alcoholism with Timothy O'Farrell at Harvard University.

Prause became a tenure track faculty member at Idaho State University at the age of 29. After three years there, she accepted a position as a Research Scientist at the Mind Research Network, a neuroimaging facility in Albuquerque, New Mexico. In 2012, Prause was elected a full member of the International Academy of Sex Research and accepted a position as a Research Scientist on faculty at the University of California, Los Angeles in the David Geffen School of Medicine. While there, she was promoted to Associate Research Scientist in 2014. Institutional attitudes towards sex research and ongoing safety threats from anti-porn organizations prompted her to found Liberos LLC in 2015. This private research institute and biotechnology company is funded entirely by grants from the federal government and private grants. She is also a licensed psychologist in California. In 2021, she rejoined UCLA where she works as a senior statistician.

=== Research ===
==== Anti-sex groups ====
One of Prause's most highly cited publications was among the first empirical studies to characterize individuals who identify as asexual.

Prause has continued to study communities that oppose masturbation, orgasm, and pornography use, including the NoFap movement. In 2024, she and James Binnie published a preregistered survey study examining potential public health effects associated with participation in "Reboot" and NoFap communities.

==== Brain stimulation to alter sexual desire ====
Prause was the lead author on the first study to apply brain stimulation to alter sexual responsiveness, using a high frequency form known as Theta Burst Stimulation (TBS). This study was also the first in the US to use primary sexual rewards in the laboratory, adopting from a history of this approach in European laboratories, to overcome the problem of sex films used as secondary reinforcers in previous research. This is thought to raise new possibilities for intervention for those with high or low sex drive, which could be altered semi-permanently by repeated TBS.

==== Sex addiction studies ====
Prause co-authored a study on the neurophysiology of porn addiction published in 2013, which concluded that hypersexuality might be better understood as a "non-pathological variation of high sexual desire", rather than an addiction.

==== Penile size preference study ====
In collaboration with psychologist Geoffrey Miller at the Mind Research Network, a neuroimaging facility in Albuquerque, Prause conducted a study in 2015 (N = 75) concerning women's preference in penis size, their preference across different kinds of relationships, and how important they considered penis size in the context of traits in a male partner. The study was the first to use 3d printed penes to rummage through and handle, rather than flat images. Results suggested that most women preferred a penis only slightly larger than average size, that their preference differs slightly across different types of relationships, and that they found penis size to be relatively unimportant in a partner, less important than cooking skills or dress, and only more important than eye color and car type. Twenty percent of participants reported never having experienced sexual intercourse prior to the start of the study. A similar percentage reported having ended a relationship "in part" because of penis size. Blueprints of all the model phalluses used in the study are publicly available.

==== Orgasmic meditation study ====
Prause co-authored a study in 2021 on the effects of orgasmic meditation, which concluded that this genital stroking practice increased closeness in partners regardless of whether or not they had an existing romantic relationship.

== Defamation and stalking ==
According to her own paper, she "was awarded damages from Andrew Stebbins, the legal counsel of NoFap LLC founder" for defamation and revealing of her address. This is a mandatory disclosure she had to make under academic conflict of interest rules.

== In the media ==
Prause has appeared in media education about sexual science, including: PBS Nova Secret Lives of Scientists, the Today show's Brain power series, After Porn Ends 2, and the Netflix mini-series The Principles of Pleasure.
