= Don Juanism =

Desire in a man to have sex with many different female partners

Don Juanism or Don Juan syndrome is a non-clinical term for the desire, in a man, to have sex with many different female partners. The name derives from the Don Juan of opera and fiction. The term satyriasis is sometimes used as a synonym for Don Juanism. The term has also been referred to as the male equivalent of nymphomania in women. These terms no longer apply with any accuracy as psychological or legal categories of psychological disorder.

== Analytical psychology ==
Psychiatrist Carl Jung believed that Don Juanism was an unconscious desire of a man to seek his mother in every woman he encountered. However, he did not see the trait as entirely negative; Jung felt that positive aspects of Don Juanism included heroism, perseverance and strength of will. Jung argues that related to the mother-complex "are homosexuality and Don Juanism, and sometimes also impotence. In homosexuality, the son's entire heterosexuality is tied to the mother in an unconscious form; in Don Juanism, he unconsciously seeks his mother in every woman he meets....Because of the difference in sex, a son's mother-complex does not appear in pure form. This is the reason why in every masculine mother-complex, side by side with the mother archetype, a significant role is played by the image of the man's sexual counterpart, the anima."

One of Theodore Millon's five narcissist variations is the amorous narcissist which includes histrionic features. According to Millon, the Don Juan or Casanova of our times is erotic and exhibitionistic.

== Psychoanalysis ==
Sigmund Freud explored the connections between mother-fixation and a long series of love-attachments in the first of his articles on the 'Psychology of Love'; while Otto Rank published an article on the Don Juan gestalt in 1922. Otto Fenichel saw Don Juanism as linked to the quest for narcissistic supply, and for proof of achievement (as seen in the number of conquests). He also described what he called the 'Don Juans of Achievement' – people compelled to flee from one achievement to another in an unconscious but never ending quest to overcome an unconscious sense of guilt. Sándor Ferenczi stressed the fear of punishment (Hell) in the syndrome, linking it to the Oedipus complex.

Contemporary psychoanalysis stresses the denial of psychic reality and the avoidance of change implicit in Don Juan's (identificatory) pursuit of multiple females.

== Cultural references ==
Aspects of the character are examined by Mozart and his librettist Da Ponte in their opera Don Giovanni, perhaps the best-known artistic work on this subject. To write their opera, Mozart and Da Ponte are known to have consulted with the famous libertine, Giacomo Casanova, the usual historic example of Don Juanism. Although not conclusively established, it is probable that Casanova attended the premiere of this opera, which was likely understood by the audience to be about himself. Charles Rosen saw what he called "the seductive physical power" of Mozart's music as linked to 18th-century libertinism, political fervor and incipient Romanticism, while in a famous passage the philosopher Kierkegaard discusses Mozart's version of the Don Juan story.

Albert Camus has also written on the subject; while Jane Austen was fascinated by the character of Don Juan: "I have seen nobody on the stage who has been a more interesting Character than that compound of Cruelty and Lust". Anthony Powell in his novel Casanova's Chinese Restaurant distinguishes Don Juan from Casanova: "Don Juan merely liked power. He obviously did not know what sensuality was....Casanova, on the other hand, undoubtedly had his sensuous moments".

In the 4th season Cheers episode "Don Juan is Hell", Diane Chambers writes a sexual history study that suggests Sam Malone as a perfect model for Don Juanism.

== See also ==
- Acting out
- Free love
- Giacomo Casanova
- Hypersexuality
- Narcissistic personality disorder (Millon's variations)
- Repetition compulsion
- Sex addict
- Pick-up artist
