= Sexual addiction =

Proposed compulsive sexual disorder

Sexual addiction is a state characterized by compulsive participation or engagement in sexual activity, particularly sexual intercourse, despite negative consequences. The concept is contentious; as of 2026, sexual addiction is not a clinical diagnosis in either the DSM or ICD medical classifications of diseases and medical disorders, the latter of which instead classifies such behaviors as a part of compulsive sexual behavior disorder (CSBD).

There is considerable debate among psychiatrists, psychologists, sexologists, and other specialists whether compulsive sexual behavior constitutes an addiction – in this instance a behavioral addiction – and therefore its classification and possible diagnosis. Animal research has established that compulsive sexual behavior arises from the same transcriptional and epigenetic mechanisms that mediate drug addiction in laboratory animals. Some argue that applying such concepts to normal behaviors such as sex can be problematic, and suggest that applying medical models such as addiction to human sexuality can serve to pathologise normal behavior and cause harm.

== Classification ==
Addiction and dependence glossary
- addiction – a neuropsychological disorder characterized by a persistent and intense urge to use a drug or engage in a behavior that produces natural reward; addictive drug – psychoactive substances that with repeated use are associated with significantly higher rates of substance use disorders, due in large part to the drug's effect on brain reward systems; dependence – an adaptive state associated with a withdrawal syndrome upon cessation of repeated exposure to a stimulus (e.g., drug intake); drug sensitization or reverse tolerance – the escalating effect of a drug resulting from repeated administration at a given dose; drug withdrawal – symptoms that occur upon cessation of repeated drug use; physical dependence – dependence that involves persistent physical–somatic withdrawal symptoms (e.g., delirium tremens and nausea); psychological dependence – dependence that is characterized by emotional-motivational withdrawal symptoms (e.g., anhedonia and anxiety) that affect cognitive functioning.; reinforcing stimuli – stimuli that increase the probability of repeating behaviors paired with them; rewarding stimuli – stimuli that the brain interprets as intrinsically positive and desirable or as something to approach; sensitization – an amplified response to a stimulus resulting from repeated exposure to it; substance use disorder – a condition in which the use of substances leads to clinically and functionally significant impairment or distress; drug tolerance – the diminishing effect of a drug resulting from repeated administration at a given dose

None of the official diagnostic classification frameworks list "sexual addiction" as a distinct disorder.

Proponents of a diagnostic model for sexual addiction consider it to be one of several sex-related disorders within hypersexual disorder. The term sexual dependence is also used to refer to people who report being unable to control their sexual urges, behaviors, or thoughts. Related or synonymous models of pathological sexual behavior include hypersexuality (nymphomania and satyriasis), erotomania, Don Juanism, and paraphilia-related disorders.

The ICD-11 created a new condition classification, compulsive sexual behavior disorder, to cover "a persistent pattern of failure to control intense, repetitive sexual impulses or urges resulting in repetitive sexual behaviour". However, CSBD is not considered to be an addiction, and the WHO does not support a diagnosis of sex addiction.

=== DSM ===
The American Psychiatric Association (APA) publishes and periodically updates the Diagnostic and Statistical Manual of Mental Disorders (DSM), a widely recognized compendium of mental health diagnostics.

The version published in 1987 (DSM-III-R), referred to "distress about a pattern of repeated sexual conquests or other forms of nonparaphilic sexual addiction, involving a succession of people who exist only as things to be used". The reference to sexual addiction was subsequently removed. The DSM-IV-TR, published in 2000 (DSM-IV-TR), did not include sexual addiction as a mental disorder.

Some authors suggested that sexual addiction should be re-introduced into the DSM system; however, sexual addiction was rejected for inclusion in the DSM-5, which was published in 2013. Darrel Regier, vice-chair of the DSM-5 task force, said that "[A]lthough 'hypersexuality' is a proposed new addition...[the phenomenon] was not at the point where we were ready to call it an addiction." According to the APA, the proposed diagnosis was not included due to a lack of research into diagnostic criteria for compulsive sexual behavior.

DSM-5-TR, published in March 2022, does not recognize a diagnosis of sexual addiction.

=== ICD ===
The World Health Organization produces the International Classification of Diseases (ICD), which is not limited to mental disorders. Version ICD-10 includes "excessive sexual drive" as a diagnosis (code F52.7), subdividing it into satyriasis (for males) and nymphomania (for females). However, the ICD categorizes these diagnoses as compulsive behaviors or impulse control disorders and not addiction. The more recent version ICD-11 includes "compulsive sexual behavior disorder" as a diagnosis (code 6C72) – however, it does not use the addiction model.

=== CCMD ===
The Chinese Society of Psychiatry produces the Chinese Classification of Mental Disorders (CCMD). In its third edition – the CCMD-3 does not include sexual addiction as a diagnosis.

=== Other ===
Some mental health providers have proposed various, but similar, criteria for diagnosing sexual addiction, including Patrick Carnes, Aviel Goodman, and Jonathan Marsh. Carnes authored the first clinical book about sex addiction in 1983, based on his own empirical research. His diagnostic model is still used by thousands of certified sex addiction therapists (CSATs) trained by the organization he founded. However, no diagnostic proposal for sex addiction has been adopted by any official medical diagnostic manual.

In 2011, the American Society of Addiction Medicine (ASAM), the largest medical group of physicians dedicated to treating and preventing addiction, redefined addiction as a chronic brain disorder, which for the first time broadened the definition of addiction from substances to include addictive behaviors and reward-seeking, such as gambling and sex. As of 2024 ASAM does not support the diagnosis of sexual addiction.

=== Bipolar disorder ===
Patients with bipolar disorder can display hypersexual behaviour during mania periods. However, the literature as of 2016 does not conclude that it can be deemed as a sexual addiction.

=== Borderline personality disorder ===
The ICD, DSM and CCMD list promiscuity as a prevalent and problematic symptom for borderline personality disorder. Individuals with this diagnosis sometimes engage in sexual behaviors that can appear out of control, distressing the individual or attracting negative reactions from others. There is therefore a risk that a person presenting with sex addiction, may in fact have borderline personality disorder. This may lead to inappropriate or incomplete treatment.

=== Medical reviews and position statements ===
In November 2016, the American Association of Sexuality Educators, Counselors and Therapists (AASECT), the official body for sex and relationship therapy in the United States, issued a position statement on sex addiction declaring that their organization "does not find sufficient empirical evidence to support the classification of sex addiction or porn addiction as a mental health disorder, and does not find the sexual addiction training and treatment methods and educational pedagogies to be adequately informed by accurate human sexuality knowledge. Therefore, it is the position of AASECT that linking problems related to sexual urges, thoughts or behaviors to a porn/sexual addiction process cannot be advanced by AASECT as a standard of practice for sexuality education delivery, counseling or therapy."

In 2017, three new USA sexual health organizations found no support for the idea that sex or adult films were addictive in their position statement.

On 16 November 2017 the Association for the Treatment of Sexual Abusers (ATSA) published a position against sending sex offenders to sex addiction treatment facilities.

Neuroscientists who are sex researchers state sex is not addictive. Addiction criteria were not met for sexual behaviours: "experimental studies do not support key elements of addiction such as escalation of use, difficulty regulating urges, negative effects, reward deficiency syndrome, withdrawal syndrome with cessation, tolerance, or enhanced late positive potentials." Аs well as evidence of a key neurobiological feature of addiction is scarce in case of sex.

Yet, despite these advances, research related to sexual addiction remains in its infancy. A lack of theoretical integration, deficits in methodological rigor, a paucity of clinical samples, over reliance on convenience samples (i.e., university students or Mechanical Turk samples), the complete absence of epidemiological studies, widespread inconsistencies in the definitions and measurements of CSB, and a lack of treatment studies all still plague the literature related to sexual addiction. If scientists, researchers, and clinicians in this domain want to bring the field forward and provide evidence-based care to people who report out-of control sexual behaviors, all of the above are needed.

— Grubbs et al. (2020)

== Diagnosis ==
=== ICD-11 ===
The Compulsive Sexual Behavior Disorder is determined by following criteria:

- Persistent pattern of failure to control intense, repetitive sexual impulses or urges resulting in repetitive sexual behaviour
- The pattern of failure to control intense, sexual impulses or urges and resulting repetitive sexual behaviour is manifested over an extended period of time (6 months or more)
- Causes marked distress or significant impairment in personal, family, social, educational, occupational, or other important areas of functioning
- Distress that is entirely related to moral judgments and disapproval about sexual impulses, urges, or behaviours is not sufficient to meet this requirement

ICD-11 added pornography to CSBD. CSBD is not an addiction and should not be conflated with sex addiction.

Two reviews from 2025 contradict each other upon whether CSBD is a behavioral addiction, according to the available evidence.

== Possible mechanisms ==
Animal research involving rats that exhibit compulsive sexual behavior has identified this behavior as mediated through the same molecular mechanisms in the brain that mediate drug addiction. Sexual activity is an intrinsic reward that has been shown to act as a positive reinforcer, strongly activate the reward system, and induce the accumulation of ΔFosB in part of the striatum (specifically, the nucleus accumbens). Chronic and excessive activation of certain pathways within the reward system and the accumulation of ΔFosB in a specific group of neurons within the nucleus accumbens has been directly implicated in the development of the compulsive behavior that characterizes addiction.

In humans, a dopamine dysregulation syndrome, characterized by drug-induced compulsive engagement in sexual activity or gambling, has also been observed in some individuals taking dopaminergic medications. Existing experimental models of addiction to natural rewards and drug reward demonstrate common alterations in gene expression in the mesocorticolimbic projection. ΔFosB is the most significant gene transcription factor involved in addiction, since its viral or genetic overexpression in the nucleus accumbens is necessary and sufficient for most of the neural adaptations and plasticity that occur; it has been implicated in addictions to alcohol, cannabinoids, cocaine, nicotine, opioids, phenylcyclidine, and substituted amphetamines. ΔJunD is the transcription factor which directly opposes ΔFosB. Increases in nucleus accumbens ΔJunD expression can reduce or, with a large increase, even block most of the neural alterations seen in chronic drug abuse (i.e., the alterations mediated by ΔFosB).

ΔFosB also plays an important role in regulating behavioral responses to natural rewards, such as palatable food, sex, and exercise. Natural rewards, like drugs of abuse, induce ΔFosB in the nucleus accumbens, and chronic acquisition of these rewards can result in a similar pathological addictive state. Thus, ΔFosB is also the key transcription factor involved in addictions to natural rewards as well, and sexual addictions in particular, since ΔFosB in the nucleus accumbens is critical for the reinforcing effects of sexual reward. Research on the interaction between natural and drug rewards suggests that psychostimulants and sexual reward possess cross-sensitization effects and act on common biomolecular mechanisms of addiction-related neuroplasticity which are mediated through ΔFosB.

=== Evolutionary perspectives ===
From an evolutionary standpoint, human sexual behavior evolved under conditions in which reproductive opportunities were limited by social, environmental, and biological constraints. A strong sex drive would historically have conferred fitness advantages for individuals, i.e. would have increased reproductive success. Modern technologies—such as readily available online pornography, cybersex, and other novel sexual outlets—may produce an "evolutionary mismatch" in which evolved predispositions collide with unprecedented access to sexual stimuli. This mismatch can intensify or hyperactivate normal mating motivations, leading, in some cases, to behaviors labeled as "sex addiction". Prevalence data consistently show that men report higher rates of compulsive sexual behavior than women, which some researchers link to men's evolutionarily shaped orientation toward short-term mating strategies. In earlier environments, sexual pursuit quickly led to reproduction, typically followed by social and hormonal changes that curbed further mating pursuits. Today, however, near-limitless sexual content allows evolved drives to manifest in ways that may be harmful or distressing, exemplifying how novel features of modern society can transform an adaptive predisposition into a potentially maladaptive compulsion.

Summary of addiction-related plasticity
Form of neuroplasticity or behavioral plasticity	Type of reinforcer						Ref.
Form of neuroplasticity or behavioral plasticity	Opiates	Psychostimulants	High fat or sugar food	Sexual intercourse	Physical exercise (aerobic)	Environmental enrichment	Ref.
ΔFosB expression in nucleus accumbens D1-type MSNs	↑	↑	↑	↑	↑	↑	
Behavioral plasticity
Escalation of intake	Yes	Yes	Yes				
Psychostimulant cross-sensitization	Yes	Not applicable	Yes	Yes	Attenuated	Attenuated	
Psychostimulant self-administration	↑	↑	↓		↓	↓	
Psychostimulant conditioned place preference	↑	↑	↓	↑	↓	↑	
Reinstatement of drug-seeking behavior	↑	↑			↓	↓	
Neurochemical plasticity
CREB phosphorylation in the nucleus accumbens	↓	↓	↓		↓	↓	
Sensitized dopamine response in the nucleus accumbens	No	Yes	No	Yes			
Altered striatal dopamine signaling	↓DRD2, ↑DRD3	↑DRD1, ↓DRD2, ↑DRD3	↑DRD1, ↓DRD2, ↑DRD3		↑DRD2	↑DRD2	
Altered striatal opioid signaling	No change or ↑μ-opioid receptors	↑μ-opioid receptors ↑κ-opioid receptors	↑μ-opioid receptors	↑μ-opioid receptors	No change	No change	
Changes in striatal opioid peptides	↑dynorphin No change: enkephalin	↑dynorphin	↓enkephalin		↑dynorphin	↑dynorphin	
Mesocorticolimbic synaptic plasticity
Number of dendrites in the nucleus accumbens	↓	↑		↑			
Dendritic spine density in the nucleus accumbens	↓	↑		↑			

== Treatment ==
=== Counseling ===
As of 2023, none of the official regulatory bodies for Psycho-sexual Counseling or Sex and Relationship therapy, have accepted sex addiction as a distinct entity with associated treatment protocols. Indeed, some practitioners regard sex addiction as a potentially harmful diagnosis and draw parallels with gay conversion therapy. As a result, treatment for sex addiction is more often provided by addiction professionals in the counseling field than psychosexual specialists. These counseling professionals typically hold advanced degrees of education including master's degrees or Doctorates in counseling or a related field like psychology. These counselors can also hold certifications like Licensed Professional Counselors (LPC-S) who are required to hold a master's degree or higher level of education. Therapists and Psychologists usually also hold a Master's in a related field of study.

Cognitive behavioral therapy is a common form of behavioral treatment for addictions and maladaptive behaviors in general. Dialectical behavior therapy has been shown to improve treatment outcomes as well. Certified Sex Addiction Therapists (CSAT) – a group of sexual addiction therapists certified by the International Institute for Trauma and Addiction Professionals – offer specialized behavioral therapy designed specifically for sexual addiction.

=== In-person support groups ===
In-person support groups are available in most of the developed world. Few studies have been done on the effectiveness of twelve-step treatment and the scientific support for the effectiveness of this treatment is weak.

Support groups may be useful for uninsured or under-insured individuals. (See also: Alcoholics Anonymous § Health-care costs.) They may also be useful as an adjunct to professional treatment. In addition, they may be useful in places where professional practices are full (i.e. not accepting new patients), scarce, or nonexistent, or where these practices have waiting lists. Finally, they may be useful for patients who are reluctant to spend money on professional treatment.

== Epidemiology ==
According to a systematic review from 2014, observed prevalence rates of sexual addiction/hypersexual disorder range from 3% to 6%. Some studies suggest that sex addicts are disproportionately male, at 80%. A review paper about pornography consumption notes that sex addiction is correlated with narcissism.

== History ==
The term sex addiction emerged in the mid-1970s when some members of Alcoholics Anonymous sought to apply the principles of 12-steps toward sexual recovery from serial infidelity and other compulsive sex behaviors that were similar to the powerlessness and un-manageability they experienced with alcoholism. Multiple 12-step style self-help groups exist for people who identify as sex addicts, including Sex Addicts Anonymous, Sexaholics Anonymous, Sex and Love Addicts Anonymous, Sexual Recovery Anonymous, and Sexual Compulsives Anonymous.

== Society and culture ==
=== Controversy ===
Nonconsensual sexual activity is sexual abuse. Treatment for sexual addiction generally will not address the factors that lead people to sexually abuse others.

— Association for the Treatment of Sexual Abusers

The controversy surrounding sexual addiction is centered around its identification, through a diagnostic model, in a clinical setting. As noted in medical literature reviews, compulsive sexual behavior has been observed in humans; drug-induced compulsive sexual behavior has also been observed clinically in some individuals taking dopaminergic drugs. Moreover, some research suggests compulsive engagement in sexual behavior despite negative consequences in animal models. Since existing diagnostic models use drug-related concepts as diagnostic criteria for addictions, these are ill-suited for modelling compulsive behaviors in a clinical setting. Consequently, diagnostic classification systems such as the DSM do not include sexual addiction as a diagnosis because there is "insufficient peer-reviewed evidence to establish the diagnostic criteria and course descriptions needed to identify these behaviors as mental disorders". A systematic review on sexual addiction conducted in 2014 argued that the "lack of empirical evidence on sexual addiction is the result of the disease's complete absence from the Diagnostic and Statistical Manual of Mental Disorders."

External media

Audio
- Robert Weiss & David Ley. Is sex addiction a myth? // KPCC (25 April 2012, 9:29 am)

Video
- Nicole Prause, Ph.D. (sexual physiologist). CBS (18 July 2013)

There have been debates regarding the definition and existence of sexual addictions for decades: the issue was covered in a 1994 journal article. The Mayo Clinic considers sexual addiction a form of obsessive compulsive disorder and refer to it as "sexual compulsivity" (note that addiction has been defined as a compulsion toward rewarding stimuli, although the ASAM describes it as "a primary, chronic disease of brain reward, motivation, memory and related circuitry.")). A paper dating to 1988 and a journal comment letter published in 2006 both asserted that sex addiction is a myth, a by-product of cultural and other influences. The 1988 paper argued that the condition is a way of projecting social stigma onto patients. "Love addiction" falls into the same controversial area since it refers to a frequent pattern of intimate relationships which can be a byproduct of cultural norms and commonly accepted morals.

In a report from 2003, Marty Klein stated that "the concept of sex addiction provides an excellent example of a model that is both sex-negative and politically disastrous." Klein singled out a number of features that he considered crucial limitations of the sex addiction model and stated that the diagnostic criteria for sexual addiction are easy to find on the internet. Drawing on the Sexual Addiction Screening Test, he stated that "the sexual addiction diagnostic criteria make problems of nonproblematic experiences, and as a result pathologize a majority of people."

It has been argued that the CSBD diagnosis is not based upon sex research.

According to Apryl Alexander, historically, in the U.S., the claim of sex addiction has been the preferred defense of white men who committed felonies. Other scientists agree.

Empirical support for the concept of sex addiction is largely missing, and the "industry of porn/sex addiction is based on conservative moral values around sexuality that intrude into clinical practice". ASAM recognized in 2024 that neither the American Psychiatric Association, nor the World Health Organization endorse the view that sex addiction exists (since CSBD is not an addiction).

Since this is a disputed diagnosis, Gola and Kraus (2021) found that the WHO reached a "good compromise" by listing CSBD as an impulse-control disorder.

Julie Sale stated "No-one refutes that clients access therapy for help with sexual behaviours that they feel they have no control over. The issue is how these client experiences are conceptualised and how the clinical formulation informs treatment."

Silva Neves states that in many cases sex addiction therapy applied to gay men is akin to conversion therapy. This was also stated in McGhee and Hollowell (2022). Charles Francis made the same point in 2023. Monica Meyer warned about it in 2018.

According to a 2024 book, "The truth is most sex therapists and educators do not prescribe to the idea of sex addiction." "Sex addiction" is a very popular term, but it has not been endorsed by psychiatry.

=== Popular culture ===
Sexual addiction has been the theme in a variety of films including Diary of a Sex Addict, I Am a Sex Addict, Black Snake Moan, Confessions of a Porn Addict, Shame, Thanks for Sharing, Don Jon, and Choke. Charles II of England was portrayed as a sex addict in 17th century satires.

== See also ==
- Compulsive sexual behaviour disorder
- Compulsive masturbation
- Hypersexuality
- Internet sex addiction
- Love addiction
- Pornography addiction
- Sexual obsessions
