= Fortification (disambiguation) =

A fortification is a military construction or building designed for defense in warfare.

Fortification may also refer to:

- Food fortification, the process of adding micronutrients like vitamins to food products
- Fortification, New Zealand
- Wine fortification, the addition of other forms of alcohol to wine

== See also ==
- Fort (disambiguation)
