= David J. Ley =

American psychologist

David J. Ley is an American clinical psychologist and author, known for his critical stance regarding sex addiction. His first book, Insatiable Wives, won a Silver Medal in the Foreword Magazine Book of the Year in 2009. A Publishers Weekly review said that his book The Myth of Sex Addiction "makes a thoughtful and persuasive argument, using case studies and ample references to the work of other psychologists to flesh out his case. While serving as an excellent resource on sex addiction, Ley's study also sheds light on the myriad cultural and sociological factors that influence relationships."

== Education ==
Ley received his bachelor's degree from the University of Mississippi, and his masters' and doctorate degrees in clinical psychology from the University of New Mexico, and is a licensed psychologist and certified sex therapist.

== Views ==
In an interview with Salon.com, he said "The sex-addiction concept is a belief system, not a diagnosis; it’s not a medically supported concept. The science is abysmal."

in an interview on Dr. Phil, he stated "I don’t think monogamy is natural. Our bodies are designed to not be monogamous. Male and female sexuality evolved in an arm’s race, each men and women trying to control whose eggs, sperm, etc made the babies.”
