= Sexual Compulsives Anonymous =

Twelve-step program

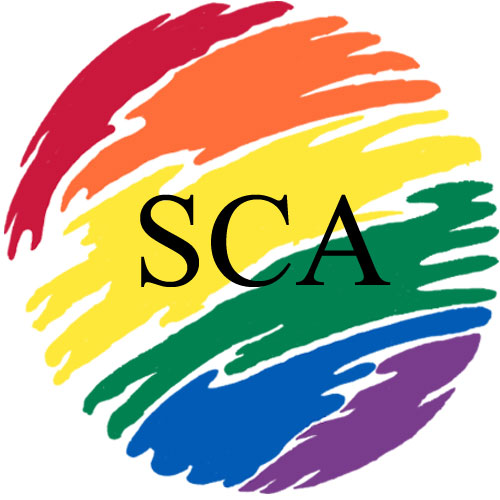
Sexual Compulsives Anonymous logo

Sexual Compulsives Anonymous (SCA) is a twelve-step program for people who want to stop having compulsive sex. SCA founding is attributed variously to 1982 in New York City and to 1973 in Los Angeles. Although the fellowship originally sought to address sexual compulsion among gay and bisexual men, and this is still the fellowship's predominant demographic, today the program is open to all sexual orientations and an increasing number of women and heterosexual men participate. Most SCA meetings are in urban areas with larger gay and bisexual male populations. Most members are white. Their ages and socioeconomic backgrounds vary. The only requirement for membership is a desire to stop having compulsive sex.

== Sexual recovery plans ==
A sample of a (blank) SCA recovery plan document

SCA supports healthy sexual expression and does not expect members to repress their sexuality, which they believe is associated with sexual anorexia. Members are encouraged to develop their own definition of sexual sobriety that does not place unreasonable demands on their time or energy, place them in legal jeopardy, or endanger their health. SCA members incorporate their definition of sexual sobriety into what they call a sexual recovery plan. Sexual recovery plans are modeled on the work of Patrick Carnes, a sexual addiction researcher, based on the model for Overeaters Anonymous (OA), whose members create individualized "food plans."

Sexual recovery plans have three columns: abstinence, high-risk, and recovery—analogous to the three circles used in Sex Addicts Anonymous. The sexual recovery plan is used as a blueprint for recovery. The abstinence column includes "bottom-line" behaviors corresponding to relapse and from which members ask their Higher Power to be freed. The high-risk column includes behaviors, emotional states, ritualized activities, and situations that make them vulnerable to relapse. The recovery column includes positive behaviors that support their wellbeing and meet their needs in a healthy manner.

== Literature and publications ==
SCA distributes its own literature, including the primary book used in the fellowship, Sexual Compulsives Anonymous: A Program of Recovery, and several book-length and smaller brochures and pamphlets, such as What About Masturbation?, Q&A: A Guide for Newcomers and Secret Shame. Parts of these brochures are published on the SCA website. SCA also publishes an online journal known as The SCAnner.

- Sexual Compulsives Anonymous (2021). Sexual Compulsives Anonymous: A Program of Recovery (3rd ed.). New York, NY. ISBN 978-1-949225-06-8.
- Sexual Compulsives Anonymous (1995). What About Masturbation?. International Service Organization of SCA. ISBN 978-0-9627966-3-0.
- Sexual Compulsives Anonymous (1993). Q&A: A Guide for Newcomers to Sexual Compulsives Anonymous. International Service Organization of SCA. ISBN 978-0-9627966-2-3.
- Sexual Compulsives Anonymous (1991). Secret shame: sexual compulsion in the lives of gay men and lesbians. Sexual Compulsives Anonymous. ISBN 978-0-9627966-1-6. OCLC 26723608.
- Sexual Compulsives Anonymous (2011). El Librito Azul [The Little Blue Book] (in Spanish). SCA International Service Org. ISBN 978-0-9627966-6-1.
- Sexual Compulsives Anonymous (March 2012). Avoiding Common Pitfalls on the Road of Recovery. Sexual Compulsives Anonymous. ISBN 978-0-9627966-7-8.
- Sexual Compulsives Anonymous (2005). Moving Through Withdrawal. Sexual Compulsives Anonymous. ISBN 978-0-9627966-4-7.
- Sexual Compulsives Anonymous (2024) Our Journey of Recovery: SCA Daily Meditations ISBN 978-1-949225-24-2
- Sexual Compulsives Anonymous (2021) Pornography, Apps & Internet Addiction ISBN 978-1-949225-05-1

SCA developed "The Twenty Questions," an instrument allowing potential members to self-evaluate their sexual compulsivity. The results of this questionnaire correlate with symptoms of prefrontal cortex dysfunction, an area of the brain thought to be relevant to addiction—not only to substances, but also behaviors such as sex and gambling as measured according to the (FrSBe) Frontal Systems Behavior Scale.

== See also ==
- List of twelve-step groups
- Sex Addicts Anonymous
- Sexaholics Anonymous
- Sex Addicts Anonymous
- Sex and Love Addicts Anonymous
