= Sexual anorexia =

Informal term for sexual aversion

Sexual anorexia is a term coined in 1975 by psychologist Nathan Hare to describe a fear of or deep aversion to sexual activity. It is considered a loss of "appetite" for sexual contact, and may result in a fear of intimacy or an aversion to any type of sexual interaction. The term largely exists in a colloquial sense and is not presently classified as a disorder in the Diagnostic Statistical Manual.

In comparing sexual anorexia to anorexia nervosa, some psychologists suggest that the two disorders share four main characteristics: control, fear, anger, and justification.

== Empirical data ==
Very few studies have been conducted to investigate the specific diagnostic patterns or criteria regarding sexual anorexia. However, one study conducted by Patrick Carnes found that many of his patients diagnosed with sexual anorexia also had a history of sexual, physical, or emotional abuse, other compulsive or addictive problems such as substance abuse, or a family history of addiction. However, only early treatment data was used, and the sample size was very limited.

=== Sexual addiction ===
In the view of some practitioners, corroborating the work of Patrick Carnes, there are people who appear to have a sexual addiction which is expressed through a variety of behaviors such as the compulsive use of strip clubs, prostitutes, porn sites, etc. but fit the definition of sexual anorexic in that they seem to lack the ability to have a relationship of a sexual nature beyond a paid-for or anonymous experience. Nonetheless, the data for sex addicts and sexual anorexics draw many similarities in terms of family, abuse, and medical history. Some people with sexual anorexia report that therapists with expertise in sex addiction are also able to help with the core issues causing them trouble. Sex and love addiction therapy groups may also have experience with sexual aversion. Some view pornography, paid sex, and visiting strip clubs as causes of unusually high or low interest in sex while others see those activities more as understandable outcomes from the conditions themselves.

=== Social phobia ===
Symptoms of sexual anorexia have also been linked to social anxiety and social phobias. A crossover between the two disorders consists of a deep fear of relationship and/or interactions with others, which for a socially anxious individual might manifest in a complete avoidance of all social interaction, including sexual interaction. Sexual anorexics may experience similar symptoms that are perhaps isolated to their sexual interactions, or the two conditions may be co-morbid.

== History of the term ==
The concept of sexual anorexia was first mentioned by psychologist Nathan Hare in his 1975 dissertation at the California School of Professional Psychology. Ellen Goodman, the nationally syndicated columnist, wrote about psychiatrist Sylvia Kaplan's use of the concept in 1981 and this was noted in the editor's "Notes" in the journal Black Male/Female Relationships. Nathan and Julia Hare's "Sexual Anorexia" in Crisis in Black Sexual Politics was published in 1989.

The term was widely popularized in psychologist Patrick Carnes' book Sexual Anorexia: Overcoming Sexual Self-Hatred, published in 1997. More recently, Julia Hare has used it in the book The Sexual and Political Anorexia of the Black Woman in June 2008.

== Symptoms ==
One of the main symptoms of the sexual anorexic is a lack of sexual desire. Fear or avoidance of sexual activity is also a characteristic of sexual anorexia - a sexual anorexic may want to or be willing to have sex, but not be able to proceed when faced with a sexual encounter due to fear or anxiety.

Other symptoms of sexual anorexia may include: a preoccupation, sometimes to the point of obsession, with sexual matters, an uncontrollable avoidance of sex, shame regarding sexual experiences, and negative attitudes about sexual activity or body image.

== Causes ==
There are many potential factors which can result in an avoidance of sexual intimacy. Physical problems resulting from exhaustion, hormone imbalances, medication use, and emotional complications resulting from rape, sexual abuse, problems with communication, or power imbalances between partners can cause sexual anorexia. Sexual anorexia can affect both men and women.

=== History of sexual abuse ===
Among the most well-documented cases of sexual anorexia are those linked to sexual assault (especially assault which occurs in childhood) and unhealthy body images. A strong feeling of aversion toward sex may be a response to earlier trauma or abuse.

=== Medication use ===
The use of certain medications, such as antidepressants, may also contribute to a loss of libido or sexual dysfunction, thus resulting in an aversion to sexual activities.

== Treatment ==
Sexual anorexics may be able to be treated by healthcare professionals, sex therapists, or mental health counselors.

Treatment may be aimed at helping the person see where their fears lie and to see the world in less black and white terms, and the patient may be encouraged to take calculated risks with social activities. The goals for both sex addicts and sexual anorexics is to learn to have a healthy relationship with sex, get emotional needs met in direct ways, and set healthy boundaries. This is an issue that requires ongoing treatment in planned stages with the end goal of autonomy, independence, and improved social relationships.

== Criticism ==
Sexual anorexia and related terms like intimacy anorexia have been criticized for using a life-threatening condition (anorexia nervosa) to describe something that may be merely annoying. Others welcome the comparison and find that sex often plays a role in actual anorexia. Another critique is that the descriptions of sexual anorexia focus more on the inconveniences it might bring to a partner rather than the difficulties sustained by the person with the condition. Terms recognized by the DSM-5 may offer more defined treatment pathways.

== See also ==
- Asexuality
- Female sexual arousal disorder
- Hypoactive sexual desire disorder
- Sex therapy
- Tantric sex
