= Sexaholics Anonymous =

Twelve-step program

Sexaholics Anonymous logo

Sexaholics Anonymous (SA), founded in 1979, is one of several twelve-step programs for compulsive sexual behavior, based on the original twelve steps of Alcoholics Anonymous. SA is part of a group of twelve-step organization addressing sexual addiction: Sex Addicts Anonymous (SAA), Sex and Love Addicts Anonymous (SLAA), Sexual Compulsives Anonymous (SCA) and Sexual Recovery Anonymous (SRA). Collectively, these groups are known as "S" groups due to their acronyms starting with "S": SA, SAA, SLAA, SCA, and SRA.

SA supports individuals who identify as "sexaholics". According to the group, a sexaholic is someone for whom "lust has become an addiction." SA distinguishes itself from other "S" groups by defining sexual sobriety as no sex with self or with partners other than with one's spouse "in a marriage between a man and a woman," and progressive victory over lust.

"In defining sobriety, we do not speak for those outside Sexaholics Anonymous. We can only speak for ourselves. Thus, for the married sexaholic, sexual sobriety means having no form of sex with self or with persons other than the spouse. For the unmarried sexaholic, sexual sobriety means freedom from sex of any kind. And for all of us, single and married alike, sexual sobriety also includes progressive victory over lust."

The group uses the Big Book of Alcoholics Anonymous and the book Sexaholics Anonymous (often referred to as The White Book) as guide. The White Book explains that "the sexaholic has taken himself or herself out of the whole context of what is right or wrong. He or she has lost control, no longer has the power of choice, and is not free to stop."

== History ==
Sexaholics Anonymous was founded by Roy K. (in twelve-step fellowships it is customary to refer to members by their first name and the first initial of their last name, in order to preserve their anonymity). SA received permission from Alcoholics Anonymous (AA) to use its Twelve Steps and Twelve Traditions in 1979.

Roy K. died from cancer on the afternoon of September 15, 2009. He claimed that he had been sexually sober since January 31, 1976.

=== Group commitment to sobriety definition ===
From the earliest attempts by Roy K. to found SA in the 1970s, and throughout the history of SA, some members have sought to change the group's concept of sexual sobriety. This was an attempt to generalize marriage similar to the 12 Step concept from Step 3 of "God as you understand God." It was an attempt to endorse as sexually sober, sexual activity by couples, not legally married, whether they be of the same or opposite sex. The fellowship did not accept this and, as a result, in 1991 some SA members and groups left SA to form Sexual Recovery Anonymous (SRA), citing the SA sobriety definition's lack of endorsement of same sex relationships and committed relationships. Murray R., one of the SRA founders had served on the SA General Service Board and had long attempted to change the SA sobriety definition to include committed relationships with either the same or opposite sex.

As early as 1991 Roy was writing to the fellowship regarding same-sex acting out. In an article titled Principles Corroborating SA's Interpretation of Sexual Sobriety Roy wrote:

"Ever since attending the April 1986 and 1987 NYC Marathons, I have been examining my own assumptions in the same-sex area. That year I wrote a letter to a same-sex member sharing my thoughts; it now has the title "Recovery Reveals Our False Assumptions." That paper, which follows, gives reasons from within our common recovery experience why I believe we in SA should not endorse or validate, even indirectly, same-sex or "committed relationship" sexualizing in SA."

In the section titled "The Great Same-Sex Controversy", Roy goes on to explain how society was divided on the "nature vs. nurture" argument about homosexuality:

"Intense controversies rage about this issue in every area of modern life in highly polarized and publicized passion. It is one of the most explosive political issues of the day. Congress is divided. Religions and churches are divided. The Twelve Step program is divided. The same-sex culture itself is divided. The "experts" are divided. The point here is this: For SA to validate same-sex sexualizing in SA, even indirectly, would have us endorsing a highly controversial biological theory and political movement against our Tenth Tradition. If we validate same-sex sexualizing as normative for the sexaholic in recovery, and it turns out not to be normative, SA will have been promoting an untruth and doing a devilish disservice, supporting the problem instead of recovery. That's an awesome responsibility we're dealing with here—human lives!"

The issue came up again in the late 1990s. A survey was held, reaching out to various individual meetings through the regional councils and local Intergroups. A solid majority of responders felt that the sobriety definition did not require clarification. Agitation on the issue continued due to a perception that the ambiguous nature of the survey questions rendered the results meaningless. The Chair of the SA General Delegate Assembly summed up this ambiguity: "I received conflicting opinions about the meaning of the January 1999 vote that we do not need to clarify the SA sobriety definition. Many (probably most) were convinced this vote meant that we are already clear on the meaning of traditional SA sobriety and no further clarification is needed. Others were equally convinced this vote meant that "spouse" and "marriage" could be interpreted as understood by each member. Some were convinced that SA is afraid to "say what it means and mean what it says."

On July 9, 1999, the General Delegate Assembly, meeting at an international conference in Cleveland, unanimously voted (9-0) to clarify the definition of "spouse" to be "one's partner in a marriage between a man and a woman". This is known as the Cleveland Clarification or the Cleveland Statement of Principle. It was overwhelmingly accepted by the membership at the group, intergroup and regional levels. In 2000, same-sex attracted SA members expressed their support for the Cleveland Clarification in a letter to SA Delegates and Trustees signed by 66 members from 7 countries. Candidates for membership in the SA Board of Trustees, are now required to affirm the SA Sobriety Definition including the Cleveland Clarification.

This controversy continues to circulate within the fellowship. The General Delegate Assembly (GDA) "is the policy-making body of SA". Any Delegate is free to propose a motion at the GDA to debate the SA sobriety definition. SA Conferences are about recovery, not for debating policy matters like the sobriety definition. ESSAY, the bimonthly international SA newsletter, states the principle in its Editorial Philosophy: "SA's sobriety definition is not debated, since it distinguishes SA from other sex addiction fellowships."

In July 2016, the GDA passed a motion further entrenching the 1999 Cleveland Statement of Principle: "In SA's sobriety definition, the term 'spouse' refers to one's partner in a marriage between a man and a woman." The motion requires the inclusion of the Statement of Principle in all SA literature on the SA website home page. Further, the motion declared that "Meetings that do not adhere to and follow [...] the Statement of Principle [...] are not SA meetings and shall not call themselves SA meetings."

SA has attracted a subsection of the same-sex attracted population who seek not to act sexually on such attractions. At the July 2007 SA International Convention a survey was conducted of 176 SA members. Asked the object of their sexual fantasy and acting out, 23% nominated same-sex and a further 7% indicated both genders. Topic meetings on same-sex issues are held at SA International Conferences and personal stories of same–sex recovery appear in ESSAY, the official SA publication. There also exist other organizations which serve such individuals (see ex-gay movement).

== International conventions ==
All SA & S-Anon conventions from inception to 2016 were held in the United States, except July 1992 and July 1997 which were both held in Canada. In 2017, the first SA International Convention was held outside North America, in Israel. In January 2019, they held their first convention in Spain.

- July 25–26, 1981 - Simi Valley, CA
- January 28–30, 1983 - Simi Valley, CA
- December 9–11, 1983 - Simi Valley, CA
- June 13, 1984 - Salt Lake City, UT
- December 7–9, 1984 - Phoenix, AZ
- December 6–8, 1985 - Oklahoma City, OK
- June 6–8, 1986 - Kansas City, KS
- December 5–7, 1986 - St. Louis, MO
- June 5–7, 1987 - Bozeman, MT
- December 4–6, 1987 - Los Angeles, CA
- July 8–10, 1988 - Rochester, NY
- January 13–15, 1989 - Salt Lake City, UT
- July 7–9, 1989 - Milwaukee, WI
- January 12–14, 1990 - Nashville, TN
- July 13–15, 1990 - Washington, DC
- January 11–13, 1991 - Oklahoma City, OK, "There is a Solution"
- July 12–14, 1991 - Chicago, IL, "Honesty, Recovery, Healing"
- January 10–12, 1992 - San Diego, CA, "Carry the MesSAge"
- July 10–12, 1992 - Vancouver, BC, Canada, "Progressive Recovery"
- January 8–10, 1993 - New York, NY, "The Solution"
- July 9–11, 1993 - Nashville, TN, "Tools of Recovery"
- January, 1994 - Rochester, NY "Spiritual Awakening"
- July, 1994 - Portland, OR "Discoveries"
- January 13–15, 1995 - Orange, CA "Living In The Solution"
- July 7–9, 1995 - Baltimore, MD "The Fellowship of the Spirit"
- January 12–14, 1996 - Phoenix, AZ "Freedom To Choose Not To"
- July 12–14, 1996 - Chicago, IL "Willing To Go To Any Length"
- January 11–13, 1997 - Oklahoma City, OK "Recovery Continues"
- July 11–13, 1997 - Regina, SK, Canada "The Promises"
- January, 1998 - Daytona Beach, FL "Our Primary Purpose"
- July 10–12, 1998 - Newark, NJ "Experience, Strength, and Hope"
- January 8–10, 1999 - Sacramento, CA "Stepping Into Recovery"
- July 9–11, 1999 - Cleveland, OH "How It Works"
- January 7–9, 2000 - Nashville, TN "Together 2000"
- July 7–9, 2000 - Detroit, MI "Practicing these Principles"
- January 19–21, 2001 - Orange, CA "Absolute Surrender: A new Beginning in Recovery"
- July 13–15, 2001 - Tysons Corner, VA "An Odyssey In Recovery"
- January 11–13, 2002 - Atlanta, GA "Courage to Change"
- July 12–14, 2002 - Portland, OR "Discovery"
- January 10–12, 2003 - Newark, NJ "Whatever it takes"
- July 11–13, 2003 - Chicago, IL "A Program of Action: Maintaining our Spiritual Condition"
- January 9–11, 2004 - San Diego, CA "There is a Solution"
- July 9–11, 2004 - Oklahoma City, OK "Spiritual Awakening"
- January 7–9, 2005 - Daytona Beach, FL "The Real Connection"
- July 8–10, 2005 - Philadelphia, PA "A New Freedom and a New Happiness"
- January 6–8, 2006 - Nashville, TN "Carrying the Message"
- July 7–9, 2006 - St. Louis, MO "Happy, Joyous, and Free"
- January 12–14, 2007 - Greensboro, NC "Our Common Welfare"
- July 6–8, 2007 - Adelphi, MD "Live and Let Go"
- January 11–13, 2008 - Newark, NJ "Chorus of Recovery"
- July 11–13, 2008 - Akron, OH "Welcome Home"
- January 9–11, 2009 - Nashville, TN "We Absolutely Insist on Enjoying Life"
- July 10–12, 2009 - Denver, CO "Serenity in the Rockies"
- January 8–10, 2010 - Nashville, TN "Fellowship of the Spirit"
- July 9–11, 2010 - Chicago, IL "Sweet Hope Chicago"
- January 14–16, 2011 - Irvine, CA "Sunshine & Serenity"
- July 15–17, 2011 - Portland, OR "Recovery on the River"
- January 13–15, 2012 - Newark, NJ "Liberty from Self in New York"
- July 27–29, 2012 - Nashville, TN "Three Legacies"
- January 11–13, 2013 - Atlanta, GA "The Courage to Change"
- July 19–21, 2013 - Baltimore, MD "Change on the Chesapeake"
- January 10–12, 2014 - Nashville, TN "Three Legacies Convention"
- July 11–13, 2014 - Detroit, MI "Miracle in Motown"
- January 23–25, 2015 - Portland, OR "Awakening the Spirit"
- July 24–26, 2015 - Chicago, IL "Crossroads of Recovery"
- January 15–17, 2016 - San Diego, CA "Reflections in San Diego"
- July 8–10, 2016 - Denver, CO "Happy, Joyous and Free"
- January 9–11, 2017 - Jerusalem, Israel "Growth and Renewal in Israel 2017"
- July 14–16, 2017 - Newark, NJ "Jersey Strong - Experience, Strength & Hope" Archived 2020-11-28 at the Wayback Machine
- January 12–14, 2018 - San Antonio, TX "12 Steppin' Deep in the Heart of Texas" Archived 2017-09-30 at the Wayback Machine
- July 13–15, 2018 St. Louis, MO "Gateway to a New Freedom!" Archived 2019-02-09 at the Wayback Machine
- January 11–13, 2019 El Escorial, Spain "Living the Slogans" Archived 2020-12-04 at the Wayback Machine
- July 12–14, 2019 Seattle, WA "Surrender, Serenity, Miracles" Archived 2018-08-30 at the Wayback Machine
- January 9–12, 2020 Nashville, TN "Design for Living"
- July 10–12, 2020 Toronto, Canada [CANCELLED]
- January 22–24, 2021 Atlanta, GA "Keys to Freedom"
- July 9–11, 2021 Salt Lake City, UT "Keystone of Recovery"
- July 14–16, 2023 Cracow, Poland "In God We Trust"
- July 12–14, 2024 Los Angeles, CA "Courage to Change"
- January 6–8, 2025 Jerusalem, Israel "Stepping into the Light" [CANCELLED]
- July 25–27, 2025 Dallas, TX "Surrender, Deep in the Heart of Texas"

== Literature ==
SA fully accepts all AA General Conference-approved literature for use in SA meetings, and SA groups frequently read from AA literature in their own meetings. SA adheres closely to the AA model, applying all of AA's principles to lust and sexual addiction, and whereas other members of other S-groups define sobriety for themselves, SA is closer to AA in proposing an understanding of sobriety which requires abstinence and is common to the group.

=== Books ===
- Big Book of Alcoholics Anonymous
- Sexaholics Anonymous. This book is also known as the "White Book". WorldCat ID 56936605. (Also available as an audiobook on CDs.)
- Recovery Continues. (Also available as an audiobook on CDs.)
- The Real Connection
- Recovery Continues
- Best of Essay, Practical Recovery Tools, 1994–2003.
- Step into Action: One, Two, Three.
- Step into Action: Four, Five, Six, Seven.
- Step Into Action: Eight, Nine, Ten, Eleven, and Twelve.
- Member Stories 1989.
- Member Stories 2007.
- SA Service Manual.

=== Booklets ===
- Best of Essay volume 1, Member Stories (2001).
- Best of Essay volume 2, Practical Recovery Tools (2001).
- Discovering the Principles.
- Beginnings... Notes on the Early Growth and Origin of SA.

=== Pamphlets ===
- SA Brochure.
- SA to the Newcomer.
- Why Stop Lusting?
- SA as a Resource for the Health & Helping Professional.
- First Step Inventory.
- Practical Guidelines for Group Recovery.
- The SA Correctional Facilities Committee.
- Do You Have a Problem with Pornography or Lust on the Internet?
- The SA Home Group
- Why Working the Steps is Important
- Am I Too Young to Be a Sexaholic?
- Does a Male have to Have Sex?
- First Find You Dr Bob
- Members of the Clergy Ask About Sexaholics Anonymous
- SA Check Meetings
- SA is for Women
- SA Sponsorship
- So, You're Going to Prison?
- So, You're Leaving Prison?
- The Spirituality of Service

== Criticism ==
A psychologist involved in sexual addiction treatment, Patrick Carnes, encourages self-defined sobriety in his writings, saying that a no-masturbation definition of sobriety is only appropriate for some sex addicts and that bottom lines can in fact be modified over time. Joe Kort criticizes SA for its pro-heterosexual marriage stance.

However, founder Roy K. knew ahead of time that this was a controversial subject and often wrote letters from a contrarian perspective. "If we come into an SA group where we can define our own sobriety, watch those rationalizations come alive! And if we define our own level of sobriety, that's all we're likely to reach." In addition, Roy studied theology for many years at a seminary. He often would leave an SA convention where he was one of the keynote speakers and preach at a church around the corner for those interested in listening to a more evangelical point of view. "We don't claim to understand all the ramifications of sexual sobriety. Some of us have come to believe that there is a deeper spiritual significance in sexual sobriety, while others simply report that without a firm and clear bottom line, our "cunning, baffling, and powerful" sexaholism takes over sooner or later.

== Related organizations ==
S-Anon is an organization for relatives of sex addicts based on the twelve steps of Alcoholics Anonymous.

== See also ==
- List of twelve-step groups
- Sex Addicts Anonymous
- Sex and Love Addicts Anonymous
- Sexual Compulsives Anonymous
- Sexual Recovery Anonymous
