= Mental distress =

Symptoms and experiences that are troubling, confusing, or unusual

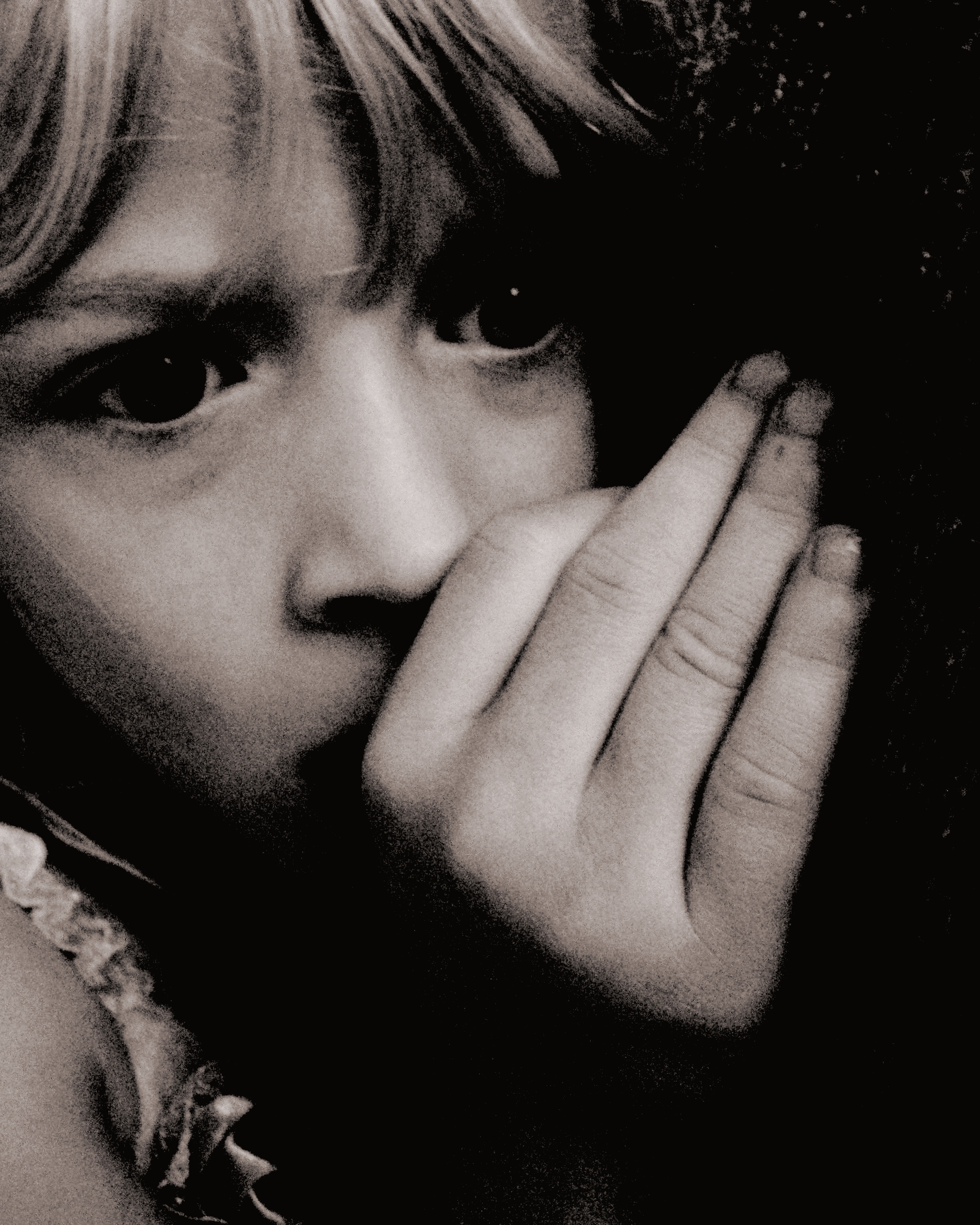
A scared child at nighttime can represent mental distress.

Mental distress or psychological distress encompasses the symptoms and experiences of a person's internal life that are commonly held to be troubling, confusing or out of the ordinary. Mental distress can potentially lead to a change of behavior, affect a person's emotions in a negative way, and affect their relationships with the people around them.

Certain traumatic life experiences (such as bereavement, harassment, stress, lack of sleep, assault, abuse, or accidents) can cause mental distress. Those who are members of vulnerable populations might experience discrimination that places them at increased risk for experiencing mental distress as well. This may be something which resolves without further medical intervention, though people who endure such symptoms longer term are more likely to be diagnosed with mental illness. Some users of mental health services prefer the term "mental distress" in describing their experience as they feel it better captures that sense of the unique and personal nature of their experience, while also making it easier to relate to, since everyone experiences distress at different times. The term also fits better with the social model of disability.

== Differences from mental disorder ==
Some mental health practitioners use the terms "mental distress" and "mental disorder" interchangeably. However, it can be argued that there are fundamental variations between mental distress and mental disorder. "Mental distress" has a wider scope than the related term "mental illness", which refers to a specific set of medically defined conditions. A person in mental distress may exhibit some of the broader symptoms described in psychiatry, without actually being 'ill' in a medical sense. People with mental distress may also exhibit temporary symptoms on a daily basis, while patients diagnosed with mental disorder may potentially have to be treated by a psychiatrist.

== Types ==
The following are types of major mental distress:

- Anxiety disorder
- Post-traumatic stress disorder
- Major depressive disorder

Some scholars believe that distress is a temporary scenario that relates to specific stressors that goes away when the stressor is removed or as the person adapts to the particular stressor. Only if the distress is excessive or persistent would it be suggestive of a mental disorder.

== Symptoms ==
Mental distress is a broad term, as such there are a number of symptoms associated with it:

- Feeling overwhelmed, helpless, or hopeless
- Feeling guilty without a clear cause
- Spending time worrying
- Having difficulty thinking or remembering
- Sleeping too much or too little
- Appetite changes
- Isolating from people or activities
- Experiencing unusual anger or irritability
- Fatigue

== Causes ==
As mental distress is a broad term, there are many causes, some common causes are abuse, harassment and bereavement.

=== Abuse ===
Research has shown that children who experience trauma and abuse are more likely to suffer from mental distress as adults. Research involving domestic violence victims has shown that emotional abuse was associated with (and therefore likely a cause of) mental distress.

=== Harassment ===
Different types of harassment can cause mental distress. After being exposed to sexual harassment research has shown the risk of mental distress increases.

=== Bereavement ===
Losing people you care about and love is usually mentally distressing and upsetting. Many studies have shown that a sudden and violent loss of a loved one can impact the mental health of people that are bereaved. This can cause mental distress and illness, such as PTSD.

== Stigma ==
There is often considerable stigma associated with mental distress. People generally underreport feeling psychological distress.

=== Demographic and societal factors ===
Avoidance is pronounced in some members of ethnic minority groups because they are less likely to seek mental health treatment. Some immigrants feel stigmatized because they're undocumented which can result in treatment not being accessed.

Disparity in regards to the treatment of Black Americans has resulted in an increase of mental distress. Seeking help and support is impacted by a lack of resources and knowledge in the community.

=== LGBTQ+ community ===
Those who identify as part of the LGBTQ+ community have a higher risk of experiencing mental distress, sometimes as a result of discrimination and victimization. This discrimination has the potential of affecting their feelings of self-worth and confidence, leading to anxiety, depression, and even suicidality. This community may refrain from seeking mental health care due to past discrimination by medical professionals. There are age based disparities within the community as most research and funding is focused on the younger LGBTQ+ population. A study published in 2021 found that "LGBTQ+ students experienced more bullying and psychological distress".

== See also ==
- Distress (medicine)
