= Sex and Love Addicts Anonymous =

Twelve-step program

- Formation: 1976; 50 years ago
- Founded at: Boston, Massachusetts, U.S.
- Purpose: Sex addiction and love addiction recovery
- Headquarters: Texas, U.S.
- Website: slaafws.org

Sex and Love Addicts Anonymous (SLAA) is a twelve-step program for people recovering from sex addiction and love addiction. SLAA was founded in Boston, Massachusetts in 1976, by a member of Alcoholics Anonymous (AA). Though he had been a member of AA for many years, he repeatedly acted out and was serially unfaithful to his wife. He founded SLAA as an attempt to stop his compulsive sexual and "romantic" behavior. SLAA is also sometimes known as the Augustine Fellowship, because early members saw many of their shared symptoms described by St. Augustine of Hippo in his work Confessions. COSLAA is another twelve-step fellowship created to support the family members and friends of sex and love addicts.

SLAA encourages members to identify their own "bottom-line behaviors." The organization identifies these behaviors as "any sexual or emotional act, no matter what its initial impulse may be, which leads to loss of control over rate, frequency, or duration of its occurrence or recurrence, resulting in spiritual, mental, physical, emotional, and moral destruction of oneself and others." Maintaining "sobriety" in the SLAA program requires abstaining from one's bottom-line behaviors. However, these behaviors are never set in stone and may change as SLAA members continue in the program. Examples of bottom-line behaviors might include sexual or romantic activity outside the scope of monogamous relationships, anonymous or casual sex, compulsive avoidance of intimacy or emotional attachment, one-night stands, compulsive masturbation, obsessive fantasy, consumption of pornography, compulsive attraction to unavailable or abusive partners, and a wide variety of addictive sexual, romantic, or avoidant behaviors.

Many of those practicing the SLAA recovery program develop the ability to engage in a healthy committed relationship. SLAA encourages recovery from sexual anorexia, emotional anorexia and social anorexia, three related areas of self-deprivation that lead to isolation and often accompany patterns of addictive behavior.

SLAA publishes the book Sex and Love Addicts Anonymous. It is approved by the organization for use in their fellowship. In an article regarding the applicability of 12-step fellowships to black women, feminist theorist Christine Saulnier criticized the SLAA book, contending that it ignored the social and political circumstances under which sexual behaviors arise and are labeled deviant.

== See also ==
- List of twelve-step groups
- Love Addiction
- Sex Addicts Anonymous
- Sexaholics Anonymous
- Sexual addiction
- Sexual Compulsives Anonymous
