= Sex Addicts Anonymous =

Twelve-step program

Sex Addicts Anonymous (SAA) is a twelve-step program founded in 1977 for people who want to stop their addictive sexual behavior. There also exists a group known as COSA, for those who have been impacted by others' sexual addiction.

== Introduction ==
SAA was founded in 1977 by several men who wanted a greater sense of anonymity than what they perceived in other twelve step programs for sex addicts. SAA is open to anyone who desires greater control over their behavior, and is intended to be safe for people of all sexual orientations.

In SAA each member creates a unique definition of "sexual sobriety" based on abstaining from a personalized list of compulsive sexual behaviors. Members are encouraged to respect each other's definitions of sobriety. Many SAA members use a "three circle" concept to model their behaviors. The inner circle represents the compulsive sexual behaviors that must not be practiced. Inner circle behaviors might include having sex with a prostitute, or acting out with a nonconsensual victim. The outer circle includes sexual and nonsexual behaviors that are definitely healthy. Outer circle behaviors might include sex with a partner in a monogamous relationship or getting eight hours of sleep a night. In the middle circle are behaviors that are not considered a relapse (inner circle behaviors), but could quickly lead to one if left unchecked. Middle circle behaviors might include looking for a prostitute or contacting an old acting out partner.

In addition to regular meetings SAA also organizes "boundary meetings." These are special meetings for professional caregivers such as medical doctors, psychotherapists, and clergy who need to attend meetings separate from clients, patients, and parishioners.

Some SAA members (a minority) may have a history of sexual abuse during their childhood, and more substance abuse problems than control groups. SAA publishes the book Sex Addicts Anonymous. It is widely used in SAA and has been officially approved as their basic text by the International Service Organization (ISO) of SAA, Inc Literature Committee. It has gained the approval of the annual conference of group delegates.

== Meetings ==
Several types of meetings are offered at SAA: in-person meetings, telemeetings, and online meetings. Meetings can be mixed (meaning both men and women attend) or gender-specific (men-only meetings vs. women-only meetings). Meetings that are advertised as closed are "open only to those individuals who have a desire to stop their addictive behavior"; in contrast, open meetings are "open to anyone interested in…SAA," regardless of whether the individual has expressed a desire to change. Additionally, telemeetings, or meetings via conference calls, and internet-based meetings are sources of real-time support outside of the traditional in-person meeting. In the United States, SAA meetings are held in all fifty states as well as the District of Columbia and Puerto Rico. In Canada, meetings are in the provinces (East to West) Newfoundland, Nova Scotia, New Brunswick, Quebec, Ontario, Manitoba, Saskatchewan, and Alberta.

== Sponsors ==
A sponsor is a member that has been part of the program for a reasonable amount of time (as determined by the "sponsee"), has attained a desirable level of sex sobriety, has worked the 12 steps (not required), and has a level of recovery that appeals to the sponsee. These individuals will help new members by offering a more personal level of availability in order to answer questions and listen to the sponsee's more sensitive problems. The sponsor will also take the sponsee through the 12 steps. Usually, newcomers will find a proper sponsor after attending a few meetings taking in consideration the level of comfort between the new member and the old one, but if a good relationship is attained, the new attendee will continue to be guided by this person.

== COSA ==
COSA is a recovery program for family or friends whose lives have been affected by someone else's compulsive sexual behavior. The official name of the organization is the acronym COSA; it is no longer the abbreviation C.O.S.A. as there was no agreement that it stood for either 'Codependents of Sex Addicts' or 'Co-Sex Addicts'. Each COSA member may choose to define themselves as a codependent of sexual addiction, as a co-sex addict, or simply as a member of COSA, according to their own personal experience and conscience.

== See also ==
- List of twelve-step groups
- Sexaholics Anonymous
- Sexual addiction
- Sex and Love Addicts Anonymous
- Sexual Compulsives Anonymous
