= Society for Sex Therapy and Research =

International non-profit professional association

The Society for Sex Therapy and Research (SSTAR, pronounced "star") is an international non-profit professional association. It provides a means for exchanging ideas among clinicians and scientists treating or studying human sexuality. SSTAR membership includes professionals in varying disciplines including Psychology, Medicine (including Psychiatry, Ob/Gyn, Urology, Internal Medicine, Family Medicine), Social Work, Marriage and Family Therapy, Nursing, Sexology and the sciences.

SSTAR provides annual professional meetings, clinical conferences, membership newsletters, and an e-mail listserv for members. Notable members have included Eli Coleman, Stephen B. Levine, Stefani Goerlich, Peggy Kleinplatz, Sandra Leiblum, Marta Meana, Kenneth J. Zucker and William (Bill) Maurice.

== History and overview ==
SSTAR was founded in 1975 and its members "have clinical and/or research interests in human sexual concerns". Psychiatrist Clifford J. Sager served as a charter member and later president of SSTAR, helping to train many of its first therapists through programs he directed in the 1970s.

== Awards ==
=== Masters & Johnson Award ===
The Masters & Johnson Award honors exceptional lifetime contributions to clinical sexuality and sexual research.

- (2023) Cynthia Graham, PhD
- (2021) E. Sandra Byers, PhD
- (2018) Marta Meana, PhD
- (2016) Barry W. McCarthy, PhD
- (2014) William Lamont Marshall, OC, FRSC, PhD
- (2013) Beverly Whipple, PhD
- (2012) Betty Dodson, PhD
- (2008) Eli Coleman, PhD
- (2007) Irv Binik, PhD
- (2006) Julia Heiman, PhD
- (2005) Stephen B. Levine, MD
- (2005) Stanley Althof, PhD
- (2005) Candace Risen, LISW
- (2004) Richard Green MD, JD, FRCPsych
- (2002) Raymond C. Rosen, PhD
- (2001) Sandra Leiblum, PhD
- (1997) Joseph LoPiccolo, PhD
- (1991) Raul Schiavi, MD
- (1990) Gene G. Abel, MD
- (1989) John Bancroft, MD, FRCP, FRCPsych
- (1988) John Money, PhD
- (1987) Robert Stoller, MD
- (1986) Harold Lief, MD
- (1985) William Masters, MD and Virginia E. Johnson, DSc

=== SSTAR Consumer Book Award ===
The Consumer Book Award, created by William (Bill) Maurice, recognizes the best recent book for a non-professional audience which enhances the understanding of human sexuality and/or sexual problems in the general public.

- (2025) When Sex Hurts: Understanding and Healing Pelvic Pain by Andrew Goldstein, MD; Caroline Pukall, PhD; Irwin Goldstein, MD; and Jill Krapf, MD
- (2023) Woman Cancer Sex by Anne Katz, PhD, RN, FAAN
- (2021) Magnificent Sex: Lessons from Extraordinary Lovers by Peggy Kleinplatz, PhD and Dana Menard, PhD
- (2019) Becoming Cliterate: Why Orgasm Equality Matters—And How to Get It by Laurie Mintz, PhD
- (2017) Come As You Are: The Surprising New Science That Will Transform Your Sex Life by Emily Nagoski, PhD
- (2015) Prostate Cancer and the Man You Love – Supporting and Caring for Your Partner by Anne Katz, PhD, RN
- (2013) Sex Matters for Women: A complete guide to taking care of your sexual self – Second Edition by Sallie Foley, Sally A. Kope and Dennis P. Sugrue
- (2011) Sex at Dawn: The Prehistoric Origins of Modern Sexuality by Christopher Ryan and Cacilda Jetha
- (2009) Mating in Captivity: Reconciling the Erotic and the Domestic by Esther Perel
- (2007) Coping with Erectile Dysfunction: How to Regain Confidence and Enjoy Great Sex by Michael E. Metz and Barry W. McCarthy
- (2006) Reclaiming Your Sexual Self: How to Bring Desire Back Into Your Life by Kathryn Hall, PhD

=== SSTAR Health Professional Book Award ===
The Health Professional Book Award, created by William (Bill) Maurice, honors the best recent book for health professionals which advances their understanding of human sexuality and/or sexual problems.

- (2024) Trans Sex: Clinical Approaches to Trans Sexualities and Erotic Embodiments by Lucie Fielding, PhD, MA, LMHC
- (2022) The Leather Couch - Clinical Practice with Kinky Clients by Stefani Goerlich, LMSW-Clinical, LISW, CST
- (2020) Better Sex Through Mindfulness: How Women Can Cultivate Desire by Lori Brotto, PhD
- (2018) Treating Out of Control Sexual Behavior: Rethinking Sex Addiction by Douglas Braun-Harvey, MA, MFT, CGP, CST and Michael A. Vigorito, LMFT, CGP, CST
- (2016) Human Sexuality: A Contemporary Introduction edited by Caroline Pukall, PhD
- (2014) The LGBT Casebook by Drs. Petros Levounis, Jack Drescher, and Mary Barber
- (2012) Rehabilitating Sexual Offenders: A Strength-Based Approach by William L. Marshall, PhD, Liam E. Marshall, PhD, Geris A. Serran, PhD, and Matt D. O'Brien, MA, MSc
- (2010) Principles and Practice of Sex Therapy * (4th Edition) edited by Sandra Leiblum, PhD
- (2008) Sex, Therapy, and Kids by Sharon Lamb, EdD
- (2006) Sexual Medicine in Primary Care by William L. Maurice, MD, FRCPC

=== SSTAR Service Award ===
The Service Award, created by William (Bill) Maurice, recognizes those who have made major contributions to the growth and history of SSTAR, often awarded ex post facto.

- (2023) Kathryn Hall, PhD
- (2016) Marta Meana, PhD
- (2013) Richard Carroll, PhD
- (2008) William Maurice, MD
- (2006) S. Michael Plaut, PhD

=== SSTAR Mentorship Award ===
The Mentorship Award recognizes extraordinary mentorship of other SSTAR members.

- (2022) Natalie O. Rosen, PhD
- (2019) Irving M. Binik, PhD

=== Sandra R. Leiblum Student Research Award ===
The Sandra R. Leiblum Student Research Award recognizes students who are pursuing a career in sexual health and is meant to support the winner’s professional development as they begin their careers.

- (2025) Katarina Kova
- (2024) Kiarah O’Kane
- (2023) Todd Jennings
- (2022) Veronique Charbonneau-Lefebvre
- (2021) Stéphanie Gauvin, PhDc
- (2020) Beata Bothe, PhD
- (2019) Laura Vowels
- (2018) Myriam Pâquet
- (2017) Stephanie Montgomery-Graham
- (2016) Amelia Stanton
- (2015) Katy Bois
- (2014) Carey S. Pulverman
- (2013) Jackie S. Huberman
- (2011) Julia Elizabeth Mackaronis
- (2010) Jane Woo
- (2009) Tuuli Kukkonen
- (2008) Melanie Jodoin
- (2007) Nicole Prause
- (2006) Kelly Smith
- (2005) Nicole Flory
- (2004) Emily Impett
- (2003) Lori Brotto
- (2000) Caroline Pukall
- (1998) Lucia F. O'Sullivan

== See also ==
- List of sexology organizations
