= Stefani Goerlich =

American author and sexologist

Stefani Elizabeth Goerlich, also published as Stefani Barner, is an American author, sexologist, researcher, and relationship counselor. She is an author of books based on academic self-help, sexual, and relational health themes.

== Early life and education ==
Goerlich grew up in Milwaukee. She obtained a bachelor's degree in Human Service from Baker College in 2012, a master's degree in Social Work with a concentration in Cognitive Behavioral Therapy from Wayne State University in 2015, and a post-graduate certificate in Sex Therapy from the University of Michigan's Sex Health Certificate Program in Ann Arbor, Michigan. As of 2025, Goerlich is pursuing a research Ph.D. in social work from Wayne State University. She is a licensed clinical social worker with advanced specialization in forensic social work and an AASECT certified sex therapist.

== Work ==
Goerlich is the founder of Bound Together Counseling in Detroit and an ABS board-certified Diplomate of Sexology. Her conversations with patients include conversations on gender-affirming care. Goerlich has served on the board of American Association of Sexuality Educators, Counselors and Therapists (AASECT), the board of Society for the Advancement of Sexual Health (SASH), and the board of Association for the Treatment and Prevention of Sexual Abuse (ATSA). She is frequently cited in mainstream media on topics such as women’s sexuality, consent and boundary setting, and sexual trauma and mental health. Her work has also been cited in scholarly and professional literature addressing kink, queerplatonic relationships, ethical non-monogamy, and kink-affirming therapy.

== Awards ==
- Coalition of Visionary Resources Visionary Awards 2009: Best New Wiccan/Pagan Title for Faith and Magick in the Armed Forces
- American Association of Sexuality Educators, Counselors, and Therapists Book Award 2021, for The Leather Couch
- Society for Sex Therapy and Research Professional Book Award 2022, for The Leather Couch
- Society for the Advancement of Sexual Health Research Award 2022, for The Leather Couch
- American Association of Sexuality Educators, Counselors, and Therapists Book Award for General Audience (audience focus) 2024, for With Sprinkles on Top

== Selected publications ==
- Barner, Stefani E. (2008). Faith and Magick in the Armed Forces. Llewellyn Worldwide. ISBN 978-0-7387-1194-2.
- Goerlich, Stefani (September 9, 2020). The Leather Couch. London New York: Routledge, Taylor & Francis Group. ISBN 978-0-367-43992-7.
- Goerlich, Stefani (July 29, 2022). Kink-Affirming Practice. New York, NY: Routledge, Taylor & Francis Group. ISBN 978-1-032-03876-6.
- Goerlich, Stefani (October 10, 2023). With Sprinkles on Top. Sounds True. ISBN 978-1-64963-035-3.
- Goerlich, Stefani; Helfer, Elyssa (August 22, 2024). Bdsm and Kink. New York, NY: Routledge, Taylor & Francis Group. ISBN 978-1-032-32063-2.
- Goerlich, Stefani; Goerlich, Wolfgang (December 8, 2025). Securing Sexuality: Emerging Issues at the Intersection of Intimacy and Technology. New York, NY: Routledge, Taylor & Francis Group. ISBN 978-1-032-48851-6.
- Goerlich, Stefani (July 2, 2024). "Cradle and all: outcome differences between kink-affirming and kink uninformed therapies for a complex client with paraphilia". Sexual and Relationship Therapy. 39 (3): 997–1020. doi:10.1080/14681994.2023.2215739. ISSN 1468-1994.
