= The Wiley Handbook for Sex Therapy =

2017 book

- First edition
- Author: Zoë D. Peterson (editor)
- Language: English
- Subject: sex therapy
- Publisher: Wiley
- Publication date: 2017
- Media type: Print
- Pages: 536
- ISBN: 978-1-118-51037-7

The Wiley Handbook for Sex Therapy is a 2017 book edited by Zoë D. Peterson in which the authors examine the theory and practice in the psychotherapeutic treatment of sexual problems across different client populations. The book is a winner of 2018 AASECT Book Award.

== Authors ==
- Zoë D. Peterson
- Stephanie Both
- Willibrord Weijmar Schultz
- Ellen Laan
- Stanley E. Althof
- Rachel B. Needle
- Pedro J. Nobre
- Kristen M. Carpenter
- Kristen Williams
- Brett Worly
- David L. Rowland
- Stewart E. Cooper
- Marta Meana
- Evan Fertel
- Caroline Maykut
- Joshua B. Grubbs
- Jan Paul Hook
- Brandon J. Griffin
- M. Scott Cushman
- Joshua N. Hook
- J. Kim Penberthy
- Dianne Berg
- Rosemary Munns
- Michael Miner
- Laurie B. Mintz
- Jackeline Sanchez
- Rachel P. Heatherly
- Constance Avery‐Clark
- Linda Weiner
- Barry McCarthy
- Lana M. Wald
- Katherine Hertlein
- Matthew Nelson
- Peggy J. Kleinplatz
- Ron Findlay
- Sue Johnson
- Kenneth M. Cohen
- Ritch C. Savin‐Williams
- Katherine G. Spencer
- Alex Iantaffi
- Walter Bockting
- Sharon Lamb
- Aleksandra Plocha
- Jennifer Hillman
- Sigmund Hough
- John W. DenBoer
- Eileen T. Crehan
- Melissa T. Stone
- Trisha Hicks
- Stephanie Buehler
- Eric S. Zhou
- Sharon L. Bober
- Kathryn Hall
- Tommy E. Turner
- Margaret Nichols
- James P. Fedor
- Meg-John Barker
- Helen M. Conaglen
- John V. Conaglen
- Jacques J. D. M. van Lankveld
