= List of sex therapists =

This is a list of notable sex therapists.

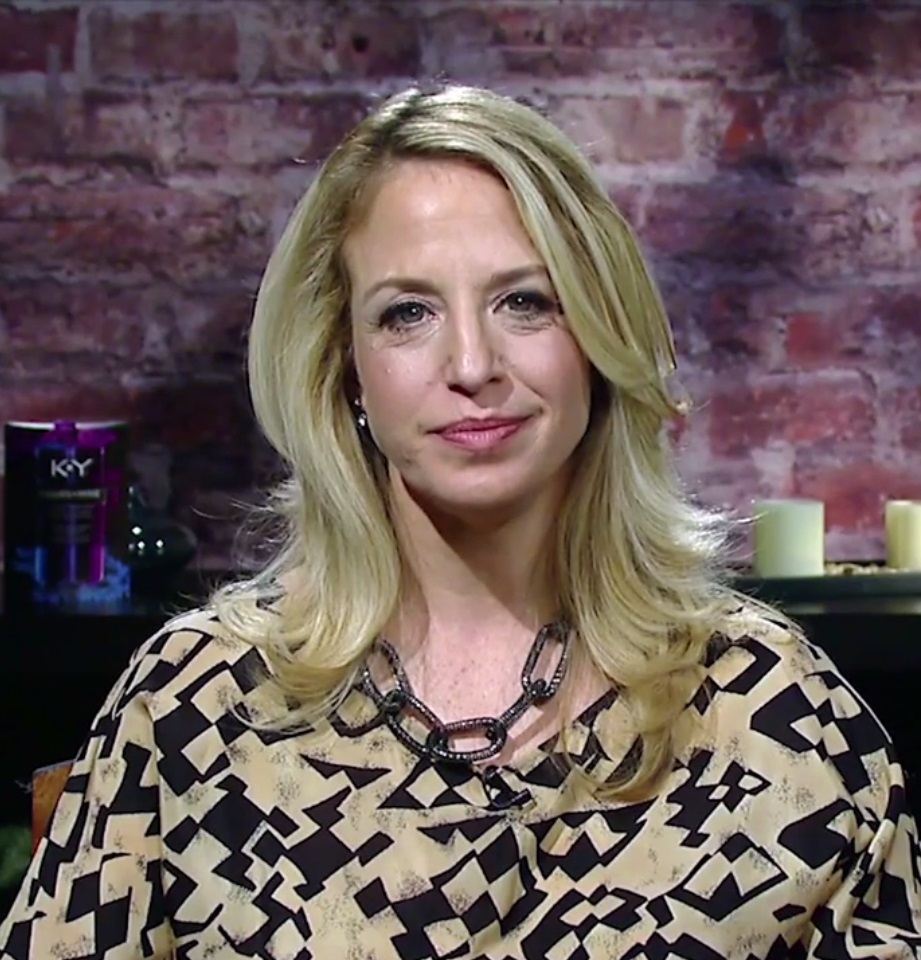
Laura Berman

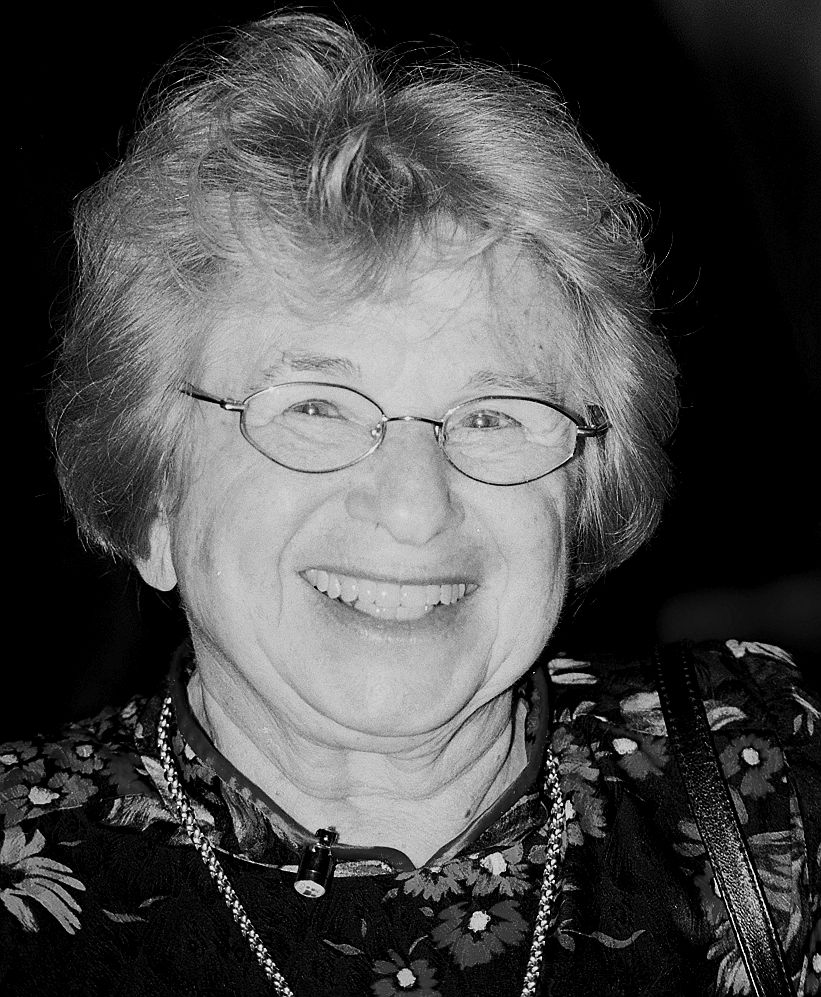
Dr. Ruth Westheimer

- Laura Berman
- Yitzchak Binik
- Lori Brotto
- Ray Blanchard
- James Cantor
- Jack Drescher
- Magnus Hirschfeld
- Sue Johanson
- Virginia E. Johnson
- Martin P. Kafka
- Helen Singer Kaplan
- Peggy J. Kleinplatz
- Heba Kotb
- Richard von Krafft-Ebing
- Sandra Leiblum
- William Masters
- Heino Meyer-Bahlburg
- John Money
- Esther Perel
- Michael Perelman
- Robert Taylor Segraves
- Ruth Westheimer (Dr. Ruth)
- Kenneth J. Zucker
