= List of sexology journals =

This is a representative list of notable academic, medical, and scientific journals in sexology (i.e., sexuality research) and its various subfields.

== Currently in print ==
- Advances in Sexual Medicine
- AIDS and Behavior
- AIDS Education and Prevention
- American Journal of Sexuality Education
- Archives of Sexual Behavior
- Biology of Sex Differences
- British Journal of Sexual Medicine
- Canadian Journal of Human Sexuality
- Culture, Health & Sexuality
- GLQ: A Journal of Lesbian and Gay Studies
- Indian Journal of Sexually Transmitted Diseases and AIDS
- International Journal of Sexual Health
- International Journal of STD and AIDS
- International Journal of Transgender Health
- Journal of Bisexuality
- Journal of Child Sexual Abuse
- Journal of Gay & Lesbian Mental Health
- Journal of Gay and Lesbian Social Services
- Journal of Homosexuality
- Journal of Lesbian Studies
- Journal of LGBT Youth
- Journal of Sex & Marital Therapy
- Journal of Sex Education and Therapy
- Journal of Sex Research
- Journal of Sexual Aggression
- Journal of Sexual Medicine
- Journal of the History of Sexuality
- Porn Studies
- Sex Roles
- Sexología y Sociedad
- Sexologies: European Journal of Sexual Health (Revue Européenne de Santé Sexuelle)
- Sexual Abuse: A Journal of Research and Treatment
- Sexual Addiction and Compulsivity: The Journal of Treatment and Prevention
- Sexuality & Culture
- Sexual and Relationship Therapy
- Sexual Development
- Sexualities
- Sexuality Research and Social Policy
- Sexually Transmitted Infections

== Discontinued ==
- Annual Review of Sex Research (became an annual special issue of the Journal of Sex Research in 2009)
- Electronic Journal of Human Sexuality (discontinued in 2015)
- Jahrbuch für sexuelle Zwischenstufen (discontinued in 1933)
- Journal of the Gay and Lesbian Medical Association (discontinued in 2002)
