= List of sexology organizations =

This is a list of organizations and institutions of professional sexologists, sex researchers, and sexual behavior scientists. These do not include organizations of non-professionals, political advocacy or activist groups (although some organizations may engage in some advocacy as one of their activities), self-help or social groups, groups of enthusiasts for a topic in sexology, or websites unassociated with any actual organization or institution. These organizations and institutions are recognized by their local governments (such as by incorporation) or are administrative units within a larger organization that is.

== Professional organizations ==
- American Academy of Clinical Sexology
- American Association of Sexuality Educators, Counselors and Therapists (AASECT)
- American Board of Sexology (ABS)
- Association for the Treatment of Sexual Abusers (ATSA)
- Brazilian Association of Human Sexuality (SBRASH)
- College of Sexual and Relationship Therapists (COSRT) previously known as British Association for Sexual and Relationship Therapy (BASRT)
- Canadian Federation for Sexual Health
- Canadian Sex Research Forum (CSRF)
- Council of Sex Education and Parenthood (International)
- Council of Sex Education and Parenthood - Andhra Pradesh & Telangana State
- European Federation of Sexology (EFS)
- European Society of Sexual Medicine (ESSM)
- Flemish Society of Sexology
- German Society for Social-Scientific Sexuality Research
- Indian Institute of Sexology Bhubaneswar
- Institute for Advanced Study of Human Sexuality (IASHS)
- Institute of Family and Sexuality Studies
- International Academy of Sex Research (IASR)
- International Association of Sexual Medicine (IAS-M)
- International Association for the Study of Sexuality, Culture and Society (IASSCS)
- International Association for the Treatment of Sexual Offenders (IATSO)
- International Institute for Trauma and Addiction Professionals (IITAP), for the treatment of sex addiction
- International Online Sexology Supervisors (IOSS)
- International Society for Sexual Medicine (ISSM)
- International Society for the Study of Women's Sexual Health (ISSWSH)
- Japan Society of Sexual Science
- Latin American Institute of Somatic Sexology (ILASS)
- Magnus Hirschfeld Archive of Sexology at the Humboldt University of Berlin
- National Association for the Treatment of Abusers (NOTA)
- Sexology SA & The Academy for Sexology
- South Asia Institute for Human Sexuality
- Sexuality Information and Education Council of the United States (SIECUS)
- Society of Australian Sexologists
- Society for Sex Therapy and Research (SSTAR)
- Society for the Psychological Study of Lesbian, Gay, and Bisexual Issues
- Society for the Advancement of Sexual Health (SASH)
- Society for the Scientific Study of Sexuality (SSSS)
- World Professional Association for Transgender Health (WPATH) (Previously, the Harry Benjamin International Gender Dysphoria Association)

== Research Institutions ==
- Kinsey Institute for Research in Sex, Gender and Reproduction; Bloomington, Indiana, USA
- Kurt Freund Laboratory; Toronto, Canada

== See also ==
- Sexology
- List of academic journals in sexology
