= Sallie Foley =

American author and therapist specializing in sexual health

Sallie Foley is an American psychotherapist, social worker and social work academic specialising in sex therapy, sexual health and the consequences of genital surgery on children.

== Early life and education ==
Foley grew up in Potomac, Maryland. She studied religion and theology at Rutgers University, Princeton Theological Seminary, and Drew University, initially intending to preach or teach. After reading Ernest Becker's The Denial of Death, she decided to pursue social work and earned a Master of Social Work degree from the University of Michigan in 1977. She later completed three years of training in psychotherapy and human sexuality before receiving certification from the American Association of Sexuality Educators, Counselors and Therapists (AASECT).

== Work ==
Foley is the director of the University of Michigan Sexual Health Certificate Program for the center for sexual health/University of Michigan Health System/Department of Social Work and the Graduate School of Social Work. She is also the former director of the center for sexual health at University of Michigan Health System/Department of Social Work. She is an AASECT certified sex therapist, educator, supervisor and diplomate of sex therapy. She has been on the faculty at the Graduate School of Social Work since 1981. Her clinical work and teaching address issues of psychological development, the treatment of sexual difficulties, and therapies for bereavement and traumatic loss. She is on the editorial board of the American Journal of Sexuality Education. Among other awards, she is the 2004 recipient of the UMHS Beverly Jean Howard award for Excellence in Social Work. Foley is a regular lecturer in the University of Michigan Medical School and Department of Psychiatry. Her current research projects include sexual health concerns and information needs of cancer patients, research providing sex therapy interventions for cancer patients, and the creation of a research database at the center for sexual health.

Foley has a private practice in psychotherapy and consultation in Ann Arbor, Michigan. Foley has written chapters and articles about the treatment of sexual difficulties and co-authored the publicly acclaimed Sex Matters for Women: A complete guide to taking care of your sexual self now in its 2nd edition. She also wrote Modern Love: A no-nonsense guide to a life of passion (AARP/Sterling, 2006) based on her “Modern Love” column in AARP The Magazine. She lectures nationally and internationally in the areas of grief, trauma and human sexuality.

== Publications ==
- Lechtenberg, Richard; Ohl, Dana; Johnston, Carolyn; Foley, Sallie (1994). Sexual Dysfunction: Neurologic, Urologic, and Gynecologic Aspects. Philadelphia: Lea & Febiger. ISBN 0812114965. OCLC 624074718.
- Foley, Sallie; Kope, Sally; Sugrue, Dennis (2002). Sex Matters for Women: A Complete Guide to Taking Care of Your Sexual Self. Guilford Press. ISBN 1572306416.
- Foley, Sallie (2005). Sex & Love for Grownups: A No-Nonsense Guide to a Life of Passion. Sterling Publishing Co., Inc. ISBN 1402717385.
- Foley, Sallie (2006). Modern Love: A No-Nonsense Guide to a Life of Passion. Sterling Publishing Co., Inc. ISBN 1402740751.
