= Sexual stimulation =

Anything that causes a sexual response

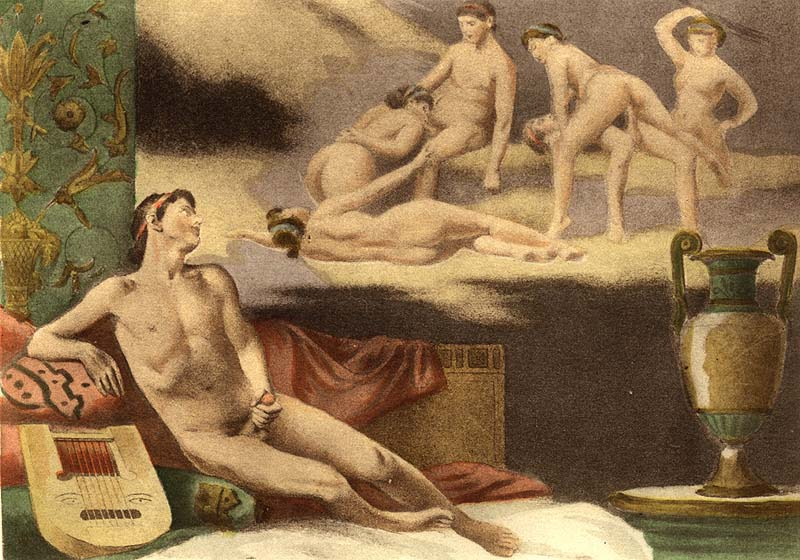
One of the illustrations to De figuris Veneris by Édouard-Henri Avril. It portrays a male masturbating by manually stimulating his own penis while sexually fantasizing.

Sexual stimulation is anything that leads to sexual arousal or orgasm. This can be physical or of other senses, and is known as a stimulus.

Sexual stimulation is a broad term, usually understood to mean physical touching of the genitals or other body parts. The term can, however, include stimuli affecting the mind (sexual fantasy), or senses other than touch (such as sight, smell, or hearing). Sufficient physical stimulation of the genitals usually results in an orgasm. Stimulation can be by oneself (masturbation or sexual fantasy) or by a sexual partner (sexual intercourse or other sexual activity), by use of objects or tools, or by some combination of these methods.

Some people practice orgasm control, whereby a person or their partner controls the level of stimulation to prolong the experience leading up to orgasm.

== History ==
Sexual intercourse, also referred to as sex, can be traced back to as early as 2 billion years ago, starting with algae and plants. Through fossilized remains of fish embryos, evidence of sexual intercourse similar to that of humans can be found. Whether pleasure was possible amongst species like plants and fish is yet to be determined, but humans have been able to have sex and, in turn, pleasure their partners. This could have started off as a way for the female to get the required reaction from a male in order to become pregnant, but the pleasure from this experience became part of, if not a main reason why, humans have continued to have sex.

As for sexual stimulation, it is only relatively recent that this topic has been studied further. While sex might have always been pleasurable, the way society has treated sex has affected the dialogue surrounding sex. In some civilizations, such as Ancient Rome, sex was used for both pleasure and reproduction, depicted in many forms of art, and was also practiced using restraint and modesty. In the Middle Ages, religious factors affected the way people viewed sex, causing many to abstain out of fear of falling into sin. During these times, hygiene was also poor and plumbing systems were barely there, if at all, which caused disease to be a contributing factor in abstinence. Around the late 1800s to the mid 1900s, the act of sex was not only beginning to surge, but also sex on different levels was being studied. This led to more researchers learning about sexual practices in different cultures, the age when sexual tendencies begin to emerge, factors that affect sex and desire, and the variations in sexual arousal and behaviors.

Since then, sex has been more openly talked about, though it is still not something many are open about. However, research is still being done, and behaviors that were previously seen as shameful (e.g. BDSM, homosexuality, polyamory) are being studied further, which has changed how people see sex and the actions involved that can make it more pleasurable.

== Physical sexual stimulation ==
Physical sexual stimulation consists of touching the genitals or other erogenous zones.

=== Genital ===
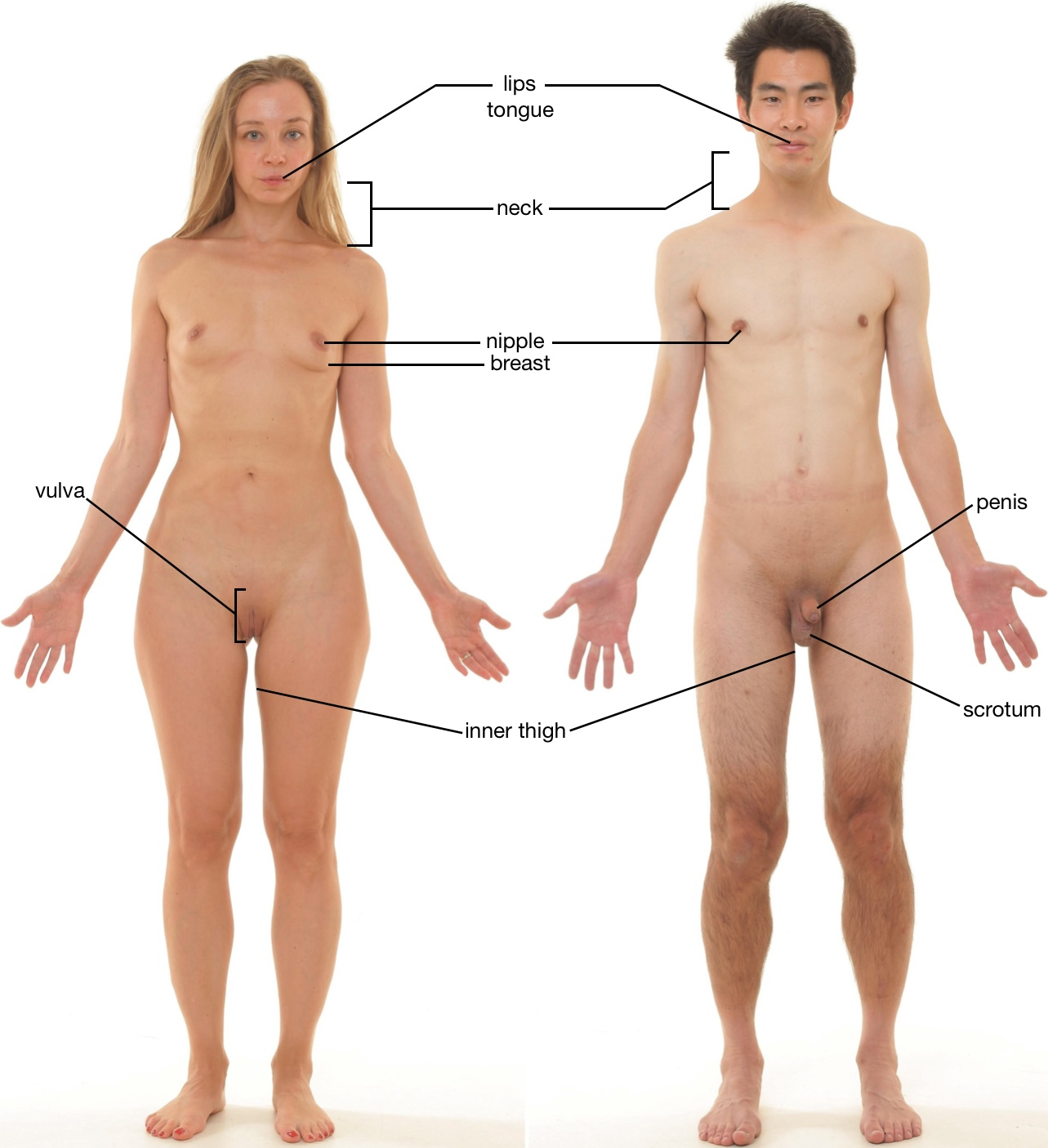
Some erogenous zones listed on a man and woman

Masturbation, erotic massage, and manual sex are types of physical stimulation involving the genitals. This stimulation is usually from sensitive touch receptors in the skin or other erogenous zones, which detect when they're being touched. Arousal is triggered through these receptors in these body parts, which cause the release of pleasure-causing chemicals (endorphins) that act as mental rewards to pursue such stimulation. Someone may become aroused by simply touching another person, though the bulbocavernosus reflex only occurs when a sexual organ (penis or clitoris) is stimulated.

The skin of the scrotum, which contains the testicles, has a dense network of sensory nerve fibres. Touching or rubbing the scrotum can contribute to sexual arousal and pleasure. The testicles are also considered an erogenous zone, although responses to stimulation vary between individuals.

The purpose of sex toys is to provide pleasure and stimulation through an alternative route than just using people's bodies. They can be used by someone on their own, with partnered sex, or group sex. They can be exciting and provide new types of stimulation that the body cannot produce, such as vibrations.

Remotely app-controlled vibrators and simulators are sometimes used in consensual adult sexual practices. Such use can involve remote partner control and customizable stimulation patterns to enhance heavy play or edge play in BDSM. Companies like Lovense are manufacturing internet connected sexual devices that can be controlled via software, allowing to adjust the stimulation.

Sex toys have been used as a source of sexual stimulation for thousands of years. There have been dildos found from the Palaeolithic era, made of siltstone and polished to a high gloss. Dildos were also made of camel dung and coated with resin. Historians are uncertain whether these have been used for religious rituals or for personal pleasure. however. The ancient Greeks created their dildos from a carved penis covered in leather or animal intestines to create a more natural feel. The Romans created double-ended dildos for use with a partner. Ancient Chinese dildos were made of bronze or other metals and some were hollow allowing them to be filled with liquid to simulate an ejaculation. These were used because wealthy Chinese men would often have too many wives to please. In Persia, it was thought that the blood of the hymen was unclean, and should be avoided by husbands. On the night before a woman's wedding, a local holy man would come and break her hymen with a large stone dildo, a ritual also used to confirm the virginity of the bride.

=== Non-genital ===
There are many areas through which a person can be sexually stimulated, other than the genitals. For example, the nipples, thighs, lips, and neck can all provide sexual stimulation when touched.

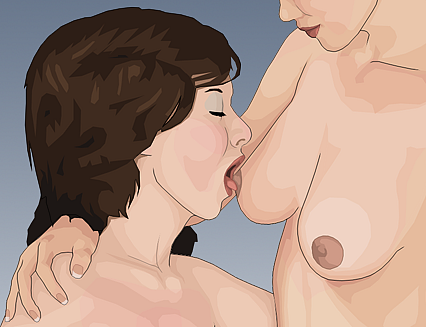
Sexual stimulation of a nipple

Nipples
One study administered a questionnaire about sexual activity to 301 participants and found that 81.5% of women reported that stimulating their nipples caused or enhanced sexual arousal and that 59.1% of them asked to have their nipples stimulated during sex. Furthermore, 51.7% of men reported that nipple stimulation caused sexual arousal, and 39% said that it enhanced their existing arousal. Research using brain-scanning technology found that stimulating nipples in women resulted in the activation of the genital area of the sensory cortex. The research suggests the sensations are genital orgasms caused by nipple stimulation, and may also be directly linked to "the genital area of the brain". In women, one study indicated that sensation from the nipples travels to the same part of the brain as sensations from the vagina, clitoris and cervix. Nipple stimulation may trigger uterine contractions, which then produce a sensation in the genital area of the brain.
Thighs
In 2012, the California Institute of Technology measured brain responses in heterosexual males as they were having their inner thighs touched whilst being MRI scanned. They were either watching a video of a woman touching their thigh or a man touching their thigh. They reported more sexual pleasure when they thought it was the woman touching them than the man, and this was reflected in their MRI scans with greater arousal of their somatosensory cortex. It can be therefore concluded that the thighs are an area that can cause sexual stimulation when touched.
Lips
Lips contain a huge number of nerve endings and are considered to be an erogenous zone. Women report experiencing more pleasure from the stimulation of their lips than men do (see below for sex differences in stimulation). In addition to stimulation of the lips by touching, men can be visually stimulated by looking at a woman's lips. It has also been reported that men prefer women with fuller lips because they are an indicator of youth.
Neck
A sample of 800 participants rated 41 different body parts on their erogenous intensity on a scale of 1–10 (10 being the most arousing). Women reported neck stimulation as being more arousing than men did.

=== Sex differences in erogenous zones ===
This table shows the sex differences in erogenous zones and includes the top ten most arousing areas for both sexes. Each body part was rated out of ten for how arousing it is when touched. Apart from body parts exclusive to one sex such as the penis or clitoris, many of the erogenous zones are similar and contain many nerve endings.

Females			Males		
Zone	Mean	Standard deviation	Zone	Mean	Standard deviation
Clitoris	9.17	2.12	Penis	9.00	2.50
Vagina	8.40	2.35	Mouth/lips	7.03	2.68
Mouth/lips	7.91	2.27	Scrotum	6.50	3.72
Nape of neck	7.51	2.70	Inner thigh	5.84	3.39
Breasts	7.35	2.73	Nape of neck	5.65	3.50
Nipples	7.35	3.15	Nipples	4.89	3.79
Inner thigh	6.70	2.99	Perineum	4.81	4.10
Back of neck	6.20	3.15	Pubic hairline	4.80	3.82
Ears	5.06	3.40	Back of neck	4.53	3.42
Lower back	4.73	3.38	Ears	4.30	3.50

=== Internal stimulation ===
The excitation-transfer theory states that existing arousal in the body can be transformed into another type of arousal. For example, sometimes people can be sexually stimulated from residual arousal arising from something such as exercise, being transformed into another type of arousal such as sexual arousal. In one study participants performed some physical exercise and at different stages of recovery had to watch an erotic film and rate how aroused it made them feel. They found that participants who were still experiencing excitatory residues from the exercise rated the film as more arousing than those who had fully recovered from the exercise. This suggests that the remaining arousal from the exercise was being transformed into sexual arousal without any external stimulation.

== Alternative routes and responses ==
The human sexual response is a dynamic combination of cognitive, emotional, and physiological processes. Whilst the most common forms of sexual stimulation discussed are fantasy or physical stimulation of the genitals and other erogenous areas, sexual arousal may also be mediated through alternative routes such as visual, olfactory and auditory means. These responses to sexual arousal can be seen in the brain as well.

=== Visual ===
Perhaps the most researched non-tactile form of sexual stimulation is visual sexual stimulation. An apparent example is the act of voyeurism – a practice where an individual covertly watches another undress or engage in sexual behaviour. Although seen socio-historically as an unacceptable form of 'sexual deviation', it highlights the human tendency to find sexual stimulation through purely visual routes. The multibillion-dollar porn industry is another example. A common presumption is that men respond more strongly to visual sexual stimuli than do women. This is perhaps best exemplified by the Kinsey hypothesis that men are more prone to sexual arousal from visual stimulation than are women. Nonetheless, both sexes can be sexually aroused through visual stimulation. In one study, visual stimulation was tested by means of an erotic video. Although significantly higher in the male group, sexual arousal was the main emotional reaction reported by both sexes. Their physiological responses to the video also showed characteristics of sexual arousal, such as increased urinary excretions of adrenaline. A subsequent study investigating male arousal showed that men were able to achieve rigid erections through visual stimulation of an erotic film alone.

Studies that use visual stimulation as a means for sexual stimulation find that sexual arousal is predominantly correlated with an activation in limbic and paralimbic cortex and in subcortical structures, along with a deactivation in several parts of the temporal cortex. These same areas are activated during physical sexual stimulation, highlighting how powerful visual stimulation can be as a means of sexual arousal.

A meta-analysis of 61 studies found that men are not more visually aroused than women, connecting fMRI machines to the brain of participants and projecting erotic videos and images. "Following a thorough statistical review of all significant neuroimaging studies, we offer strong quantitative evidence that the neuronal response to visual sexual stimuli, contrary to the widely accepted view, is independent of biological sex," the researchers wrote. "Our analysis demonstrates that there is no functional dimorphism in response to visual sexual stimuli between men and women."

=== Olfactory ===
Olfactory information is critical to human sexual behavior. One study investigating olfactory sexual stimulation found that heterosexual men experience sexual arousal in response to a female perfume. Individuals rated odourant stimulation and perceived sexual arousal. They also had functional MRI scans taken during the experiment. The results showed that olfactory stimulation with women's perfume produces activation of specific brain areas associated with sexual arousal in men. Another study found that homosexual men displayed similar hypothalamic activation to that of heterosexual women when smelling a testosterone derivate present in male sweat, suggesting that sexual orientation plays a role in how humans experience olfactory sexual stimulation.

Evolutionary analysis of sex differences in reproductive strategies can help explain the importance of smell in sexual arousal due to its link to immunological profile and offspring viability. This is because olfactory cues may be able to trigger an incest avoidance mechanism by reflecting parts of an individual's genetic equipment. In one study, males rated visual and olfactory information as being equally important for selecting a lover, while females considered olfactory information to be the single most important variable in mate choice. Additionally, when considering sexual activity, females singled out body odour from all other sensory experiences as most able to negatively affect desire.

=== Auditory ===
Auditory stimulants may also serve to intensify sexual arousal and the experience of pleasure. Making sounds during sexual arousal and sexual activity is widespread among primates and humans. These include sighs, moans, strong expirations and inspirations, increased breathing rate and occasionally, at orgasm, screams of ecstasy. Many of these sounds are highly exciting to people, and act as strong reinforcers of sexual arousal, creating a powerful positive feedback effect. Thus, copulatory vocalisations are likely to serve mutual sexual stimulation for mating partners.

Even when not coupled with "touching", sounds can be highly sexually arousing. Commercial erotic material (mainly produced for the male market) uses such sounds extensively. As early as the 1920s and 30s, several genres of singers turned to "low moans" for erotic effect. Vaudeville Jazz singers often incorporated sex sounds into the narrative of the lyrics. Even contemporary music such as Prince's "Orgasm" or Marvin Gaye's "You Sure Love to Ball" includes sounds of the female orgasm. Research has shown music to be an auditory sexual stimulant. In one mood induction study, exposure to certain music resulted in significantly greater penile tumescence and subjective sexual arousal for men. In a similar experiment, women did not show significant physiological responses to certain types of music but did report higher levels of sexual arousal. Further studies have looked at the connection between auditory stimulation and the experience of sexual pleasure. Whilst the highest levels of physiological and subjective arousal were found for visual stimuli, spoken-text was found to elicit sexual arousal in men, implicating sounds as a means of sexual stimulation. Phone sex is one type of arousal inducer that makes use of this effect.

=== Brain ===
When sexual stimulation is perceived, there are systems in the brain that receive the stimuli and respond to it. During physiological sexual arousal, the autonomic nervous system responds to signals from central nervous system and prepares the body for sexual activity. The autonomic nervous system engages the parasympathetic and sympathetic systems, which are responsible for blood flow to genital and erectile tissues, and to muscles that participate in sexual responses. This results in responses like increased breathing rate, heart rate, and pupil dilation. The limbic system also plays a part in how sexual stimuli are received. A study done about pleasure and brain activity in men showed that electrical stimulation of the limbic system is highly pleasurable, and can sometimes generate orgasmic responses. During genital stimulation different areas of the brain are activated in men and women. For men, a study saw that genital stimulation caused part of the cerebral cortex and the insula, which is a part of the sympathetic and parasympathetic systems, to activate. For women, during clitoral stimulation parts of the secondary somatosensory cortex were activated. In both men and women the amygdala was deactivated.

== Mental stimulation ==
Sexual arousal includes feelings, attractions and desires, as well as physiological changes. These can be elicited not only by physical but also mental stimulations, such as fantasy, erotic literature, dreams, role-play, and imagination.

=== Fantasy ===
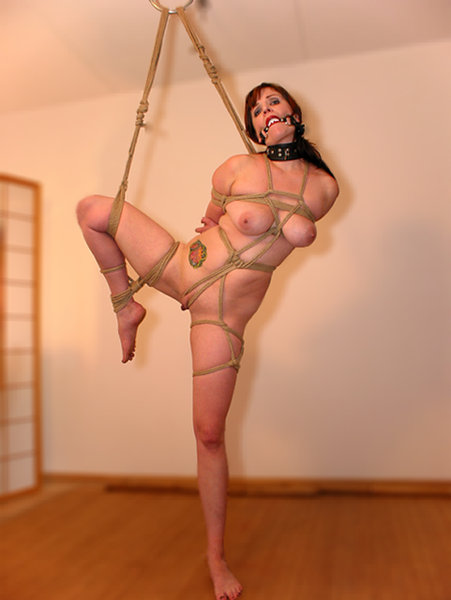
Bondage can be a sexual fantasy and is often practiced by those participating in BDSM

Sexual fantasy is a form of mental sexual stimulation which many people engage in. It is where a person imagines a sexual experience while they are awake. Fantasy has less social or safety limits than in real life situations. It gives people more freedom to experiment or think of things they could not necessarily try in real life and can be anything from imagining your spouse naked, to imagining a sexual experience with a mythical creature. Common sexual fantasies include imagining activities with a loved partner, reliving past experiences and experiences with multiple partners of the opposite gender. It is also common to have fantasies about things you would not do in real life and about taboo or illegal activities, such as forcing another, or being forced by another to have sex, intercourse with a stranger and sex with a boy or girl or older partner.

It is useful for research because it makes differences between male and female heterosexual preferences clearer than studies of behaviour. Many sexual fantasies are shared between men and women, possibly because of cultural influence. However, there are still gender differences that have been found. Men are more likely than women to imagine being in a dominant or active role, whereas women are more likely to imagine themselves as passive participants. Women's fantasies have significantly more affection and commitment, whereas men are more likely to fantasise using visual imagery and explicit detail. One study found that women benefit more from pleasurable sex with a committed partner, while gender did not impact the relationship with masturbation. One explanation of this difference comes from the evolutionary perspective. Women have a higher minimum parental investment than males (they have 9 months of gestation prior birth and are then the main care givers, whereas men only have to provide sperm to ensure their genes are passed on) and are therefore more likely to want commitment from their partner in order to gain resources to improve their offspring's chance of survival.

Fantasies can have benefits, such as increasing arousal more than other forms of sexual stimuli (such as an erotic story) and increasing sexual desire. Individuals who disclose their sexual fantasies to their partners also have a higher sexual satisfaction. However, whether people are willing to open up to their partner generally depends on the content of such fantasies. A more negative effect of sexual fantasy is that it has been linked with sexual crimes, and indeed sexual offenders often report that they have had fantasies related to their offense. However, such fantasies are also common among those who have not been involved in such criminal acts and non-offenders do not use their fantasies to guide their behaviour. Therefore, fantasy alone cannot be used as a sign that someone will become an offender.

=== Dreams ===
Nocturnal emission orgasms or "wet dreams" or "erotic dreams" are when people ejaculate or orgasm during sleep. These occur during REM (rapid eye movement) phases of sleep, which is the main stage when humans dream. This implies that erotic dreams alone are enough to stimulate men, but erections accompany all REM phases. According to self-report data, as many as 22% of young women may also experience orgasm during sleep, with such dreams being more common in college students in higher school years than younger students. The orgasms experienced were positively correlated with high emotionality, including sexual excitement, but also anxiety.

=== Sexual role-play ===
Sexual role-play is when people act out characters or scenarios which may sexually stimulate each other. This can include fantasies (discussed above) and fetishes, such as BDSM (bondage and discipline, dominance and submission, sadism and masochism) or age-play. It has been described by some as an adult form of L.A.R.P (live action role-play). Role-play can also be carried out online, by typing stories to each other or pretending to be a character, and is therefore a form of mental stimulation you can engage in with another person without them being physically present. Many adolescents find online role-play pleasurable and arousing.

Role-play can also include sexual fan fiction, where characters from well-known stories, that were not sexually or romantically together in the original story, are written into sexual scenes. Slash fiction is a type of fan fiction where the characters of the same sex (originally male-male) engage in romantic or sexual activities. Slash fiction allows people the freedom to share stimulating things that can be counter-cultural.

=== Kinks ===
Sexual kinks also play a role in sexual stimulation in the sense that they involve unconventional sexual practices, concepts, and fantasies. This is a term that comes from the idea of a person bending their typical behavior in order to be more intimate with their partner(s), and is not to be confused with a fetish. Kinks can enhance the overall sexual experience by opening a conversation with those involved, which helps build trust and create a comfortable environment where boundaries can be set and new things can be tried. In terms of sexual stimulation, kinky behavior and actions are often used to increase pleasure, improve stimulation, and potentially decrease feelings of shame. When engaging in kinks, it is important for people to understand themselves and what they might want, as well as what the other person(s) might want, which can be done through converstion and asking for consent throughout the overall experience.

== Role of sexual dysfunctions in sexual stimulation ==
=== Women ===
==== Physiological factors ====
According to the National Library of Medicine, approximately 80% of middle aged women with heart failure have reported a decrease in vaginal lubrication, leading to challenges in successful intercourse. The reduction in lubrication affects the vaginal moisture during sexual activity. Women with hypoactive sexual desire (HSDD) may also experience a lack of interest in sexual stimuli, thus affecting their psychological responses to sexual cues. Within the study conducted by Sandra Garcia and her colleagues, suggested that trauma-related changes may impact genital tissues, affecting blood flow and response to sexual stimulation. As well as when psychologic distress is present it affects the ability to achieve orgasm despite adequate sexual stimulation. This is a result of relationship issues that affect sexual stimulation and sexual response, connecting back to orgasmic difficulties.

==== Hormonal factors ====
The deficiency of estrogen leads to conditions like dyspareunia, which is something important for maintaining adequate lubrication. Therefore there is hormonal treatment that is used which is the addition of in-taking estrogen supplements. But as well as the supplementation of testosterone, which was shown as beneficial for enhancing desire, arousal, and sexual satisfaction. There could also be some hormonal changes when it comes to going through the phases of aging. A review in 'The Journal of Sexual Medicine', showed how pre-menopause women showed more sexual dissatisfaction. This was shown due to their hormonal imbalances.

=== Men ===
==== Physiological factors ====
According to the Cleveland Clinic, sexual dysfunctions are common and can happen at any point throughout the sexual response cycle. Among these disorders are desire, arousal, orgasm, and pain. Causes of sexual dysfunction include, but are not limited to, diabetes, heart disease, chronic conditions, alcohol/substance use disorder, and cancer. For males, some symptoms include the inability to maintain or achieve an erection (erectile dysfunction), absent or delayed ejaculation, and being unable to control the timing of ejaculation. Low testosterone has also been a symptom that affects both men and women, and are generally associated with aging.

==== Hormonal factors ====
Hormonal imbalances can affect sexual dysfunctions. Having too much or too little of a hormone is what causes the imbalance, such as having low testosterone. Regarding sex hormone imbalances, an imbalance of testosterone can result in decrease/loss of body hair, loss of muscle mass, enlarged breast tissue, and infertility, to name a few. Besides this, depression, stress, and anxiety/fear of sexual failure can also be caused by hormonal imbalances that cause sexual dysfunction (though in this case, many of the aforementioned hormone imbalances are associated with erectile dysfunction).

== Sex therapy ==
=== Sex therapists ===
Sex therapy is used to address sexual health and sexual problems. A key aspect to sex therapy is having a sex therapist, which is a licensed healthcare provider who has specialized training in sexual health and sexual problems. Sex therapists aid in treating sexual dysfunctions and resolving sexual difficulties using treatments that are backed by evidence and research. Sex therapists often use psychotherapy, or talk therapy, in order to help their patients build relationships that assess parts of themselves that are deeper than the surface, such as sexual trauma and issues with body image. Through each part of the sexual response cycle, sex therapists can aid in improving sex and acts that can aid in sexual stimulation.

=== Therapy methods ===
Sex therapy sessions often begin with health and sexual background, sex education, beliefs about sex, and specific sexual concerns. Oftentimes, sex therapists will have their patients openly communicate and assign homework. This oftentimes includes activities that can be done with more privacy, such as exploring kinks, sensual touching, and sensate focus. These exercises are used to reduce anxiety surrounding sex and get those involved more comfortable with each other and themselves. By addressing these problems through various methods, sex therapy sessions can assist in sexual arousal between people and decreasing some of the causes of sexual dysfunctions.

== See also ==
- Effects of hormones on sexual motivation
- Ejaculation
- Stimulation of the clitoral hood
