= Gay and Gray =

1982 non-fiction book

Gay and Gray: The Older Homosexual Man is a non-fiction book by Raymond Mark Berger, first published in 1982 by the University of Illinois Press. Another edition was published in 1995. The book chronicles men with same sex attractions.

== Background ==
The author surveyed 112 men. Six men have their life stories chronicled. According to Berger, the older men generally found more positive social atmospheres as they often accepted that they liked men and did not have to hide their sexual orientations, and that this contradicted a stereotype that older gay men find calamity.

Berger received notes suggesting that he not study matters related to homosexual men.

This was the first monograph to examine its subject matter. Adam stated that general discouragement, citing the notes Berger received, likely meant others had not written a prior book about the subject. In 1997, book reviewer Elizabeth Friedman also described the amount of research in the topic as "sparse". Douglas Kimmel of City College of New York wrote that "stigma" made older gay populations to be "more than invisible", though by 1983 academic journals began publishing articles about aging gay people.

Kimmel wrote that "apparently not all respondents gave permission" to the authors to have their interviews made public in the book.

== Contents ==
The 1995 edition includes four articles, from the Journal of Homosexuality, that became chapters in that edition.

== Reception ==
Friedman stated that the logic in the discussions in the book was "well-reasoned". Merryn Gott of the University of Sheffield described the content that documented changing views of homosexuality in different time periods as having "fascinating insights".

Kimmel described the book as a "a very welcome addition" to the subject matter. He stated it "is very useful and highly recommended".
