= Nicole LaVoi =

American kinesiologist

Nicole M. LaVoi is a senior lecturer in the School of Kinesiology at the University of Minnesota and the director of The Tucker Center for Research on Girls & Women in Sport.

== Education ==
Nicole M. LaVoi earned a graduate M.A. (’96) and doctoral degrees (’02) in Kinesiology with an emphasis in sport psychology/sociology from the University of Minnesota.

Her dissertation “Examining Relationships in Sport Contexts” was an inquiry into aspects of the coach-athlete relationship that facilitate mutual growth and development using the Wellesley Centers for Women Relational-Cultural theory. She attended Gustavus Adolphus College (‘91) as an undergraduate and graduated as Summa Cum Laude with a B.A. in Health Fitness and Communication as well as a minor in English. LaVoi grew up in St. Cloud, Minnesota and attended Technical High School (‘87).

== Career ==
Before attending graduate school for her doctorate, LaVoi was a USPTA Teaching Pro, ran a variety of programs for the USTA, was an assistant coach for the Carleton College women’s tennis team (1992–1993), head coach for the St. Paul Academy girls' tennis team (‘91-93), head women’s tennis coach at Wellesley College (1994–1998) and an assistant professor of physical education at Wellesley College (1994–1998). From 2002-2005, she served as the program and research associate at The Mendelson Center for Sports, Character & Community at the University of Notre Dame before returning to the Tucker Center. LaVoi served as an assistant and associate director of The Tucker Center for Research on Girls & Women in Sport from 2005–2019 and took over the director position after the retirement of Mary Jo Kane, the Tucker Center’s founder and first director. The Tucker Center, established in 1993, was the first and only research center of its kind in the world solely devoted to the academic study of girls and women in sport and is known as a global leader in establishing standards of excellence for scholarly inquiry, graduate education and community outreach and public service. Since 2005, LaVoi has served as a lecturer for The University of Minnesota Kinesiology department, teaching in social and behavioral sciences.

== Research ==
Through multidisciplinary research, LaVoi focuses on questions that involve the lives of sport stakeholders, particularly girls and women. Her work focused on the relational qualities of the coach-athlete relationship, the effect of adult behaviors (parents and coaches) on children and youth, the emotional experiences of youth sport parents, the physical activity of undeserved girls, and media representations of girls and women in sport. Her seminal research includes the annual Women in College Coaching Report Card,, which aims to retain and increase the number of women in the coaching profession, and an award-winning book Women in Sports Coaching (2016) named a 2017 Outstanding Academic Title by Routledge.

== Documentaries ==
LaVoi has co-produced three Emmy-nominated documentaries with tptMN—Game ON: Women Can Coach! (2018), [Concussions & Female Athletes: The Untold Story (2011) and Media Coverage & Female Athletes: Women Play Sports, Just Not in the Media (2013) which won a regional Emmy for best sports documentary.

== Sport background ==
LaVoi coached and taught tennis at all levels for 17 years and became a certified USPTA pro in 1991. She was involved with many USTA programs, including the NJTL, The Schools Program, Junior Team Tennis, Regional Training Centers, USA Tennis, and has coached Zonal, Intersectional, and Jr. Fed Cup teams in both the New England and Northern USTA sections. She coached high school tennis for two years as the Head Coach at St. Paul Academy. At that time she was also the Assistant Women’s Coach at Carleton College before being named the Head Tennis Coach at Wellesley College in 1994. She played collegiate tennis at Gustavus Adolphus College in Minnesota. Her team won the NCAA-III National Championships in 1990, and she was a two-time NCAA Academic All-American. She also played internationally in the German Club system and nationally in 5.0 USA League tennis.

== Recent publications ==
A full list of LaVoi's publications are listed on her personal website https://nmlavoi.com Her most cited publications are:

Shields D, Bredemeier BL, LaVoi NM, Power FC. The sport behaviour of youth, parents and coaches. Journal of research in character education. 2005 Jan 1;3(1):43-59. (Cited 258 times, according to Google Scholar)

Shields DL, LaVoi NM, Bredemeier BL, Power FC. Predictors of poor sportspersonship in youth sports: Personal attitudes and social influences. Journal of Sport and Exercise Psychology. 2007 Dec 1;29(6):747-62. (Cited 245 times, according to Google Scholar.)

Camacho-Miñano MJ, LaVoi NM, Barr-Anderson DJ. Interventions to promote physical activity among young and adolescent girls: a systematic review. Health education research. 2011 Dec 1;26(6):1025-49. (Cited 238 times, according to Google Scholar.)

Kane MJ, LaVoi NM, Fink JS. Exploring elite female athletes’ interpretations of sport media images: A window into the construction of social identity and “selling sex” in women’s sports. Communication & Sport. 2013 Sep;1(3):269-98. (Cited 237 times, according to Google Scholar.)

LaVoi NM, Dutove JK. Barriers and supports for female coaches: An ecological model. Sports Coaching Review. 2012 May 1;1(1):17-37. (Cited 186 times, according to Google Scholar.)

Some recent papers are:

LaVoi, N. M. & Boucher, C. (2021). Supporting and Developing Women in Sport Coaching: A Career Trajectory Approach. In Leanne Norman (Ed.) Improving Gender Equity in Sport Coaching. Routledge

LaVoi, N. M., & Glassford, S. (2021). ‘This is our family’: LGBTQ family narratives in online coaching biographies. Journal of Homosexuality. http://dx.doi.org/10.1080/00918369.2021.1921506.

Daniels, B., Hood, A., LaVoi, N. M., & Cooky, C. (2020). Sexualized and athletic: Viewers’ attitudes toward sexualized performance images of female athletes. Sex Roles.

Wasend, M., & LaVoi, N. M. (2019).“Are Women Coached by Women More Likely to Become Sport Coaches? Head Coach Gender and Female Collegiate Athletes’ Entry into the Coaching Profession” Women in Sport and Physical Activity Journal.

LaVoi, N. M., McGarry, & J. E., Fisher, L. A. (2019). Final thoughts on women in sport coaching: Fighting the war. Women’s Sport & Physical Activity Journal, 27(2), 136-140.
