= Sandra Leiblum =

American sexologist (1943–2010)

- Born: 1943; New York City, U.S.
- Died: January 28, 2010 (aged 66–67); Edison, New Jersey, U.S.
- Education: Brooklyn College (BA); University of Illinois Urbana-Champaign (PhD)
- Occupation: Sexologist
- Scientific career
- Fields: Sexology

Sandra Risa Leiblum (1943–2010) was an American author, lecturer, and researcher in sexology.

== Biography ==
Leiblum was born in Brooklyn, New York, earned her B.A. from Brooklyn College and graduated with a Ph.D. in psychology from the University of Illinois Urbana-Champaign. She completed a postdoctoral fellowship at the University of Colorado Medical Center in Denver. In 1972 she joined the faculty of the Department of Psychiatry of University of Medicine and Dentistry of New Jersey (UMDNJ), Robert Wood Johnson Medical School. During her career she studied sexual issues in many circumstances addressing among others transgender situations, infertility, and menopause. She was on the editorial board of the Journal of Sex Education and Therapy and the Journal of Gay and Lesbian Social Services. Among the honors she received were the Masters and Johnson Lifetime Achievement Award (awarded by the Society for Sex Therapy and Research in 2001) and the Distinguished Scientific Achievement Award (awarded by the Society for the Scientific Study of Sex for distinguished contributions to sexuality research over a lifetime in 2003). She was the first president the International Society for the Study of Women's Sexual Health in 2000 and a past president of the Society for Sex Therapy and Research, as well as a Fellow of the Society for the Scientific Study of Sexuality.

In 2001, Leiblum described the Persistent Genital Arousal Disorder as a new syndrome.

On January 28, 2010, Sandra Leiblum died in Edison, New Jersey, eight months after suffering a stroke and bicycle accident. The Society for Sex Therapy and Research (SSTAR) subsequently named an award in her honor.

== Bibliography ==
Books written or edited include:

- 'Principles and Practice of Sex Therapy' (now in its fourth edition)
- 'Treating Sexual Desire Disorders'
- 'Erectile Disorders: Assessment and Treatment'
- 'Case Studies in Sex Therapy'
