= Laura Berman =

American sex educator

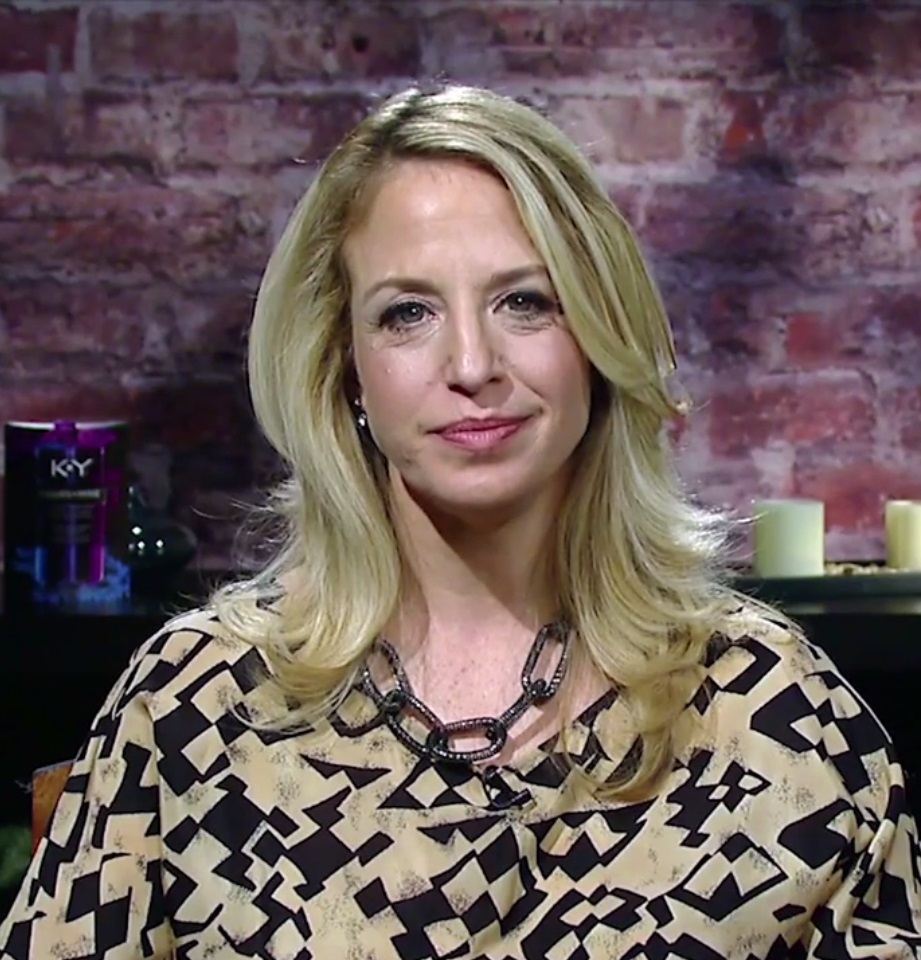
Berman in 2015

Laura Berman is an American relationship therapist and television host. She is the host of In the Bedroom with Dr. Laura Berman on the Oprah Winfrey Network (OWN). She is also a regular guest on The Dr. Oz Show, and hosts her own nationally syndicated radio program, Uncovered with Dr. Laura Berman. She previously starred in Showtime's reality television series Sexual Healing.

== Education ==
Berman received her undergraduate degree from the University of Vermont, where she was a member of Alpha Chi Omega sorority. After obtaining a master's degree in clinical social work and a doctorate in health education specializing in human sexuality from New York University, she went on to complete a training fellowship in sexual therapy with the Department of Psychiatry, New York University Medical Center.

== Career ==
Berman is an assistant clinical professor of obstetrics and gynecology and psychiatry at the Feinberg School of Medicine at Northwestern University. She is the author of the books It's Not Him: It's You and The Book of Love: Every Couple’s Guide to Emotional and Sexual Intimacy, and the New York Times best-selling books Real Sex for Real Women: Intimacy, Pleasure, & Sexual Wellbeing and For Women Only: A Revolutionary Guide to Overcoming Sexual Dysfunction and Reclaiming Your Sex Life as well as Secrets of the Sexually Satisfied Woman: 10 Keys to Unlocking Ultimate Pleasure and The Passion Prescription. She is a weekly columnist for the Chicago Sun-Times and has appeared on Fox News and CNN and in The New York Times, USA Today, and major women's magazines. She also has her own line of adult toys.

Berman is also a member of the American Association of Sex Educators Counselors and Therapists, the Society for the Scientific Study of Sexuality, the National Association of Social Workers, the International Society for the Study of Women's Sexual Health, and the American Urologic Society.

She, as well as her sister, urologist Jennifer Berman, have been critiqued for their role involving women's sexual health: "The shift of the Bermans' practices from academic centers to the explicitly for-profit commercial sector speaks volumes about the new 'Viagra culture'."

Laura and Jennifer Berman co-authored the book For Women Only: A Revolutionary Guide for Reclaiming your Sex Life. Both Berman sisters participated in The Women's Conference in 2004.

In 2016 she published Quantum Love: Use Your Body's Atomic Energy to Create the Relationship You Desire.

In 2021, she started her podcast 'The Language of Love'.

== Personal life ==
Berman is married to Samuel Chapman. During the course of their marriage, Chapman and Berman became the parents of three sons. One son, Sam, died on February 7, 2021, aged 16, from what his parents believe to have been fentanyl-laced Percocet that he had bought from a drug dealer on Snapchat.

== See also ==
- List of sex therapists
