= Irving M. Binik =

Canadian sexologist

Yitzchak M. "Irv" Binik (born February 6, 1949) is an American-Canadian psychologist whose main research interest is human sexuality, specifically sexual pain (vaginismus and dyspareunia).

== Career ==
The only child of Abraham and Bella Binik, originally from Nowy Lupkow and Lodz respectively, he grew up in Rochester, N.Y. In 1970, Binik earned B.A. in History from New York University and a B.H.L. in Jewish Studies from the Jewish Theological Seminary. He then studied experimental psychopathology and Clinical Psychology at University of Pennsylvania, earning a M.A. in 1972 and a Ph.D. in 1975, following a Clinical Internship at Warneford Hospital's Department of Psychiatry at University of Oxford in 1974-1975. His dissertation was on circadian rhythms and escape learning in the laboratory rat.

He has taught at McGill University since 1975 and has been a full professor since 1992. He coordinates the Sex and Couple Therapy Service of Royal Victoria Hospital, part of the McGill University Health Centre in Montreal. Binik is a fellow of the Canadian Psychological Association and a diplomate of the American Board of Sexology. In 2003 Binik was awarded the Canadian Psychological Association prize for distinguished contribution to professional psychology. In 2006, he received the Masters and Johnson Award for lifetime achievement from the Society for Sex Therapy and Research.

Much of his research has focused on sexual response in women, including women who have experienced menopause. Binik reported that sexual response in women and men was not markedly different in terms of speed.

Binik has also studied male sexual response, reporting that circumcision may not affect sensation.

He has written on how sexual pain should be reclassified from a sex disorder to a pain disorder in the Diagnostic and Statistical Manual of Mental Disorders. In 2008, Binik was selected for the DSM-V Sexual & Gender Identity Disorders Work Group chaired by Kenneth Zucker.

== Selected publications ==
- Devins GM, Orme CM, Costello CG, Binik YM, Frizzell B, Stam HJ, Pullin WM (1988). Measuring depressive symptoms in illness populations: Psychometric properties of the Center for Epidemiologic Studies Depression (CES-D) Scale. Psychology & Health, Volume 2, Issue 2 April 1988, pages 139 – 156.
- Binik YM, Devins GM, Barre PE, Guttmann RD, Hollomby DJ. Mandin H, Paul LC, Hons RB, Burgess ED (1993). Live and learn: Patient education delays the need to initiate renal replacement therapy in end-stage renal disease. Journal of Nervous and Mental Disease, 181(6):371-376
- Meana M, Binik YM (1994). Painful Coitus: A review of female dyspareunia. Journal of Nervous and Mental Disease. 182(5):264-272.
- Bergeron S, Binik YM, Khalifé S, Cohen D (1997). Dyspareunia: Sexual dysfunction or pain syndrome? Journal of Nervous and Mental Disease. 185(9):561-569.
- Bergeron S, Binik YM, Khalifé S, Pagidas K (1997). Vulvar vestibulitis syndrome: A critical review. The Clinical Journal of Pain. 13(1):27-42, March 1997.
- Meana M, Binik YM, Khalifé S, Cohen DR (1997). Biopsychosocial profile of women with dyspareunia. Obstetrics & Gynecology. 1997;90:583-589.
- Binik YM, Mah K, Kiesler S (1999). Ethical issues in conducting sex research on the internet. Journal of Sex Research. Feb 1999; 36, 1.
- Meana M, Binik YM, Khalifé S, Cohen D (1999). Psychosocial correlates of pain attributions in women with dyspareunia. Psychosomatics. 40:497-502, December 1999.
- Binik YM, Bergeron S, Khalifé S (2000). Dyspareunia. In Leiblum SR (ed.) Principles and practice of sex therapy. 4th ed., New York: The Guilford Press. ISBN 978-1-59385-349-5
- Bergeron S, Binik YM, Khalifé S, Pagidas K, Glazer HI, Meana M, Amsel R (2001). A randomized comparison of group cognitive-behavioral therapy, surface electromyographic biofeedback, and vestibulectomy in the treatment of dyspareunia resulting from vulvar vestibulitis. Pain. 2001 Apr;91(3):297-306.
- Bergeron S, Binik YM, Khalifé S, Pagidas K, Glazer HI (2001). Vulvar vestibulitis syndrome: Reliability of diagnosis and evaluation of current diagnostic criteria. Obstetrics & Gynecology. 2001;98:45-51.
- Bergeron S, Brown C, Lord MJ, Oala M, Binik YM, S (2002). Physical therapy for vulvar vestibulitis syndrome: A retrospective study. Journal of Sex & Marital Therapy. Volume 28, Number 3, 1 May 2002, pp. 183–192(10)
- Pukall CF, Binik YM, Khalifé S, Amsel R, Abbott FV (2002). Vestibular tactile and pain thresholds in women with vulvar vestibulitis syndrome. Pain. 2002, vol. 96, no1-2, pp. 163–175 (1 p. 1/2).
- Reissing ED, Binik YM, Khalifé S, Cohen D, Amsel R (2003). Etiological correlates of vaginismus: Sexual and physical abuse, sexual knowledge, sexual self-schema, and relationship adjustment. Journal of Sex & Marital Therapy. Volume 29, Issue 1 January 2003, pages 47 – 59.
- ED Reissing, YM Binik, S Khalifé, D Cohen, R Amsel (2004). Vaginal spasm, pain, and behavior: An empirical investigation of the diagnosis of vaginismus. Archives of Sexual Behavior. 2003, vol. 29, no. 1, pp. 47–59.
