= Heba Kotb =

Egyptian sex therapist (born 1967)

Heba Gamal Kotb
- هبة قطب
- Born: September 19, 1967 (age 59); Egypt
- Other name: "Egypt's Dr. Ruth"
- Education: Cairo University; Maimonides University
- Occupations: Sexologist, talk show host
- Television: Host of The Big Talk, an Egyptian sexual advice show
- Children: 3
- Website: hebakotb.net

Heba Kotb (Arabic: هبة قطب; born September 19, 1967) is an Egyptian certified sex therapist and host of The Big Talk, a sexual advice show airing in Egypt. The first licensed sexologist in the country, Kotb bases her methods on the teachings of the Qur'an, which she says encourages healthy sexual relationships between husband and wife. She has been called: "Egypt's Dr. Ruth."

== Early life and education ==
Born and raised in Egypt, Kotb grew up wanting to be a surgeon. She has three children.

She attended medical school at Cairo University, writing a thesis entitled "Medicolegal Implications of Sexually Transmitted Diseases in Sexually abused Children." While writing her thesis, she realized that she had very little idea about normal sexuality. As a result, she began researching the topic, eventually coming across a passage in the Qur'an discussing sexual relations between husbands and wives that she saw as speaking to the woman's sexual rights. Of the experience, she said:

I was so proud of my religion when I saw that. My religion was advanced enough to talk about women's rights in sexuality how many years before modern science did?

In 2003, she became the first licensed sexologist in Egypt, graduating with a degree in clinical sexology from Maimonides University in Florida. She continued her studies, eventually earning a Ph.D with her 2004 thesis, entitled "Sexuality in Islam".

In 2002, she started writing a sex advice column in a Cairo newspaper. She also provides sex therapy to male and female patients at an Islam-oriented sex therapy clinic in Cairo, and by 2017 had published four books on sexual relationships. As of 2021, she had more than 2 million followers on her Facebook page. She is also an assistant professor of psychology at the American University of Cairo.

== The Big Talk ==
Kotb's show, The Big Talk, is a weekly call-in show broadcast on Al Mehwar, an Egyptian satellite channel; the show is transmitted across the Arab world. In the show she answers questions about common sexual topics, including masturbation (she is against it for women), oral sex (OK if both people consent), the best sexual positions, penetration from behind (that's fine), sex toys (fine, if no injuries), foreplay, orgasm, erectile dysfunction, premature ejaculation, sex during a woman's period (Allah does not permit it; it is haram, prohibited by Islam), marital rape (it results from possessiveness at times, or a husband's feeling that his wife isn't giving him enough time and attention), anal sex (she condemns it; it is also haram), homosexuality (she says it is a disease), and conversion therapy (she practices it).

Although Kotb says that she is open to most questions, as part of her proposal she agreed to not discuss sex outside of marriage.

Although Kotb's show is extremely popular, it has drawn its share of conservative critics. Sheik Youssef al-Badri, a conservative cleric noted for his support of female circumcision, has criticized her show for "increas[ing] the number of sex perverts".

She has been called: "Egypt's Dr. Ruth," a comparison to German-American sex therapist and author Ruth Westheimer.

== Beliefs about sexuality ==
Kotb cites Al-Baqara ("The Cow"), the longest surah (chapter) of the Quran, as her inspiration for understanding human sexuality, noting that it speaks about the daily life of a man and woman and commands the man to provide pleasure to his wife. She argues that Islam in general and the Qu'ran in particular is very permissive of sex, and that discussion of the topic is suppressed not by religion but by culture.

While this stance is seen as extremely liberal in Egypt, Kotb's beliefs about sexuality tend to be conservative by Western standards. Although she has called for women to explore their bodies, she has also stated that women do not need to masturbate, discouraging the practice by saying that "a woman has to remain blank until she gets married and by masturbating she's forming her sexuality."

== See also ==
- List of sex therapists
