= Unbound Inc =

American sexual wellness company

Unbound Inc.
- Industry: Sex toys
- Founded: 2012
- Founder: Polly Rodriguez and Sarah Jayne Kinney
- Headquarters: New York, United States
- Area served: Worldwide
- Website: https://unboundbabes.com/

Unbound Inc. is an American sexual wellness company based in New York. Unbound manufactures sexual accessories for women, including vibrators and lubricants. In 2018, the company was announced runner-up at the TechCrunch Disrupt - San Francisco.

== History ==
In 2012, entrepreneur Polly Rodriguez and Sarah Jayne Kinney founded the company. Unbound was started as a quarterly subscription box but later launched its own product line. In 2018, the company competed in TechCrunch Disrupt’s Battlefield competition and won 2nd place for their wearable, fashion-forward vibrator ring, Palma. The company were finalists at Disrupt SF, 2018.

In June 2017, Unbound Babes launched "Vibes for Congress", an initiative to support Planned Parenthood, and raised $2.7 million from Founders Fund, Slow Ventures, Arena Ventures, SoGal Ventures and others.

In May 2018, Metropolitan Transportation Authority rejected ads from Unbound for being too sexual.

== Products ==
Initially, Unbound offered women a sensual subscription service, which included several sexual stimulation aids. Notably, Unbound manufactured a geometric-shaped metallic vibrator ring named as Palma, which was well received among customers. Palma was designed by Julia Lopez.
