= Lori Brotto =

Canadian psychologist

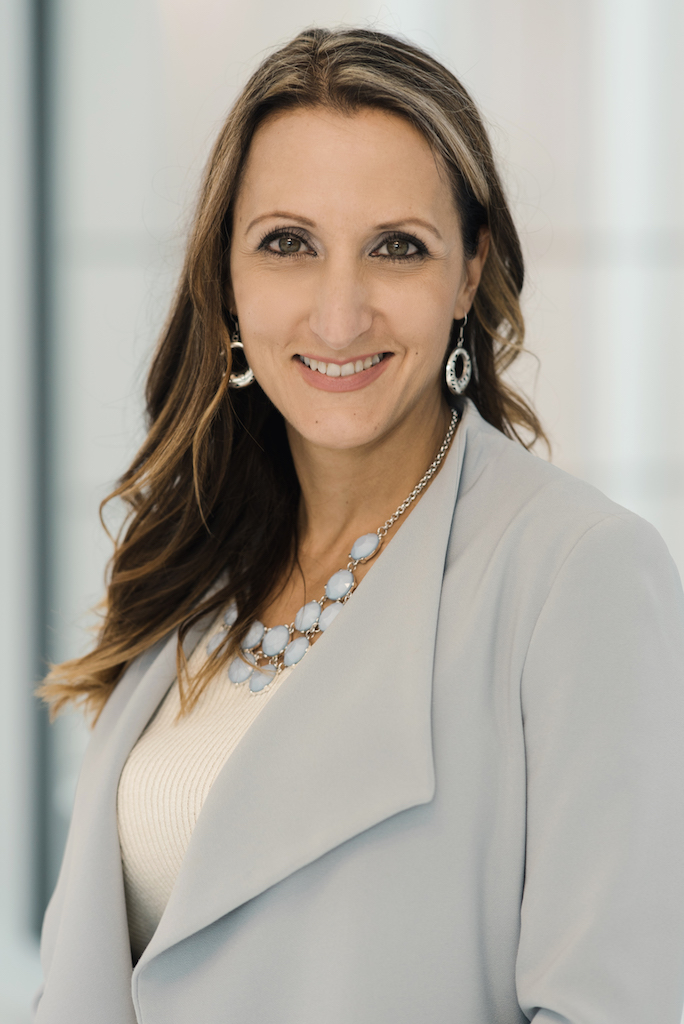
- Lori A. Brotto (2017)
- Education: University of British Columbia
- Occupations: Psychologist and Professor
- Scientific career
- Thesis: Genital and subjective sexual arousal in women: Effects of menopause, sympathetic nervous system activation, and arousal disorder (2003)

Lori Anne Brotto (born 1975) is a Canadian psychologist best known for her work on female sexual arousal disorder (FSAD).

== Career ==
In 1993, Brotto graduated Johnston Heights High School in Surrey, British Columbia. Brotto attended the University of British Columbia, earning a biopsychology B.Sc. in 1997, a M.A. in 1999, and a Ph.D. in clinical psychology in 2003. In 2003, she completed a one-year internship in the Department of Psychiatry at the University of Washington, followed by a two-year Postdoctoral Fellowship in Reproductive and Sexual Medicine. Brotto was licensed as a Psychologist in the Province of British Columbia in 2005 and has held a position in the Department of Obstetrics and Gynaecology at the University of British Columbia since 2005. She is currently the Executive Director for the province of BC's Women's Health Research Institute.

Brotto is currently a member of the International Academy of Sex Research, and a member of the Society for Sex Therapy and Research, she is Past-President of the Canadian Sex Research Forum, and the Canadian Psychological Association. She is an Associate Editor for the Archives of Sexual Behavior, and is on the editorial boards for the Journal of Sex Research, Journal of Sex and Marital Therapy, International Journal of Sexual Health, and Canadian Journal of Human Sexuality.

Brotto specializes in sexual issues for individuals during and after treatment for gynecological cancer, saying that "50% to almost 100% of women following gynaecological cancer do report some degree of sexual impairment depending on the kind of cancer treatment they've had." In 2005 Brotto launched North America's first study to explore a mindfulness-based treatment aimed at helping cancer survivors treated with radical hysterectomy regain their sexual health. To Brotto, the one defining feature of sexual dysfunction is the level of interference it causes. "If lack of desire or inability to reach orgasm interferes in a woman's life, distresses her, or creates a burden on her relationship with her partner, then it could do with some fixing. If it doesn't, then leave well enough alone." She coauthored two chapters on managing FSAD and low sexual desire in women in the 2009 publication Clinical Manual of Sexual Disorders edited by Richard Balon and Robert Taylor Segraves.

More recently, inspired by the work of Jon Kabat-Zinn, Brotto has been involved in leading several randomized clinical trials evaluating mindfulness-based treatments for problems of low sexual desire/loss of arousal, sexual distress associated with sexual abuse, provoked vestibulodynia, and situational erectile dysfunction. She is also interested in sexual difficulties associated with gynaecologic and colorectal cancers (men and women), and women with provoked vestibulodynia (genital pain) and outcome research focused on psychological and mindfulness-based methods in the treatment of sexual dysfunction.

Lori Brotto is a leading expert in the field of women's sexual health who has shown how mindfulness can be a powerful tool for addressing sexual concerns. As she explains, "Mindfulness is not something you can just read about and expect to work. You have to be motivated to do the practice." In other words, the benefits of mindfulness require active engagement and commitment.

== Book ==
Brotto's book, Better Sex through Mindfulness, is published by Greystone Books in April 2018. Here, Brotto offers a groundbreaking approach to improving desire, arousal, and satisfaction in women. A pioneer in the use of mindfulness for treating sexual difficulties, Brotto has helped hundreds of women cultivate more exciting, fulfilling sexual experiences. In this accessible, relatable book, she explores the various reasons for sexual problems, such as stress and incessant multitasking, and tells the stories of many of the women she has treated over the years. She also provides exercises that readers can do on their own to increase desire and sexual enjoyment, whether their goal is to overcome a sexual difficulty or simply give their love life a boost.

== Selected publications ==
=== Book ===
- Brotto, L. A. (2018). Better sex through mindfulness: How women can cultivate desire. Vancouver, Canada: Greystone Publ. ISBN 1771642351

=== Research works ===
- Brotto L. .A (2003). Genital and Subjective Sexual Arousal in Women: Effects of Menopause, Sympathetic Nervous System Activation, and Arousal Disorder. University of British Columbia, ISBN 0-612-85429-9
- Basson R, Brotto LA (2003). Sexual psychophysiology and effects of sildenafil citrate in oestrogenised women with acquired genital arousal disorder and impaired orgasm: a randomised controlled trial. BJOG: An International Journal of Obstetrics & Gynaecology 2003 Nov;110(11):1014-24.
- Graziottin A, Brotto LA (2004). Vulvar Vestibulitis Syndrome: A Clinical Approach. Journal of Sex & Marital Therapy, 2004 May-Jun;30(3):125-39.
- Basson R, Leiblum S, Brotto LA, Derogatis J (2004). Revised Definitions of Women's Sexual Dysfunction. The Journal of Sexual Medicine, 2004 Jul;1(1):40-8.
- Basson R, Brotto LA, Laan E, Redmond G, Utian WH (2005). Assessment and Management of Women's Sexual Dysfunctions: Problematic Desire and Arousal. ‘’Journal of Sexual Medicine." 2005 May;2(3):291-300.
- Brotto LA (2005). Psychologic-based desire and arousal disorders: Treatment strategies and outcome results. In Goldstein I, Meston CM, Davis S, Traish A (Eds.). Textbook of Female Sexual Dysfunction. Taylor & Francis Medical Books, pp. 443–450.
- Brotto LA. Klein C (2007). Sexual and Gender-Identity Disorders. In: Hersen M, Turner SM, Beidel D. (Eds.) Adult Psychopathology and Diagnosis (Fifth Edition). John Wiley & Sons, Hoboken, NJ, pp. 504–570. ISBN 0-470-11466-5
- Brotto LA, Luria M. (2008). Menopause, Aging, and Sexual Response in Women. In: Rowland DL, Incrocci L. (Eds.). Handbook of Sexual and Gender Identity Disorders. John Wiley & Sons, Hoboken, NJ, pp. 251–283. ISBN 978-0-471-76738-1
