= Certified sex therapist =

Therapist trained in sex physiology

Certified Sex Therapists (CST) have graduate degrees in a clinical mental health field (e.g., clinical psychology, social work, mental health counseling) and have obtained advanced training in sex therapy from a credentialed training body, resulting in certification. One of the largest such bodies is the American Association of Sexuality Educators, Counselors and Therapists (AASECT).

== Certification Criteria ==
The specific certification criteria can vary from credentialing body to credentialing body. Florida is the only state that requires certification to market oneself as a "sex therapist," requiring 120 hours of in-depth training in sexual issues and concerns and 20 hours of sex therapy supervision.

== AASECT-Specific Criteria ==
AASECT certified sex therapists are mental health professionals, trained to provide in-depth psychotherapy, who have specialized in treating clients with sexual issues and concerns. They are either licensed, or in the absence of available licensure, certified, registered, or clinical members of a national psychotherapy organization. At present, AASECT requires that applicants for sex therapist certification be current members of AASECT, have a graduate degree, post-degree clinical experience, liability insurance, and a valid state license to practice psychology, medicine, social work, counseling, nursing, or marriage and family therapy.

AASECT requirements include 90 hours of courses in 15 core areas of human sexuality, and also 60 hours of training in seven specific disciplines related to sex therapy. Every AASECT certified sex therapist must agree to abide by the AASECT code of ethics, which stresses competence and integrity along with moral, ethical, and legal responsibility to safeguard the well-being of clients. Further, AASECT certification requires up to 50 hours of direct supervision by a AASECT certified sex therapy supervisor — half of these hours can take place in small, pre-approved groups. For the vast majority of professionals in health care and human services, certification is a prerequisite to practice. AASECT credentials sexual health professionals on the basis of rigorous standards for academic preparation, supervised training and consultation, field-related experience and applied skills. Field experience and practical application of skills and competencies carried out under trained and approved supervision or consultation are crucial aspects of certification. Applicants must substantiate completion of certification requirements with academic transcripts and other formal documentation, and must also undergo peer review of their credentials.

== PLISSIT Model ==
Using the PLISSIT model for Sexual Counseling, sex therapists are trained to perform all four steps (P-LI-SS-IT). The P-LI-SS-IT model for Sexuality Counseling:

- Permission (P): The practitioner creates a climate of comfort and permission for clients to discuss sexual concerns, often introducing the topic of sexuality, thereby validating sexuality as a legitimate health issue.
- Limited Information (LI): The practitioner addresses specific sexual concerns and attempts to correct myths and misinformation.
- Specific suggestions (SS): The practitioner compiles a sexual history or profile of the client:

1. Defining the issues and concerns of the client.
2. Determining the course of how the issues have evolved over time.
3. Facilitating the client's understanding of the main issues and providing options for resolution.
4. Assisting the client in formulating perceptions and ideas about sources of these concerns and developing realistic and appropriate goals and solution plans.

- Intensive Therapy (IT): The practitioner provides specialized treatment in cases that are complicated by the coexistence of other complex life issues which may also include psychiatric diagnoses such as depression, anxiety disorders (including obsessive-compulsive disorder), personality disorders, or substance abuse, or by interpersonal or intrapersonal conflict.

== Certified sex therapy treatment ==
Certified sex therapists work with simple sexual concerns, but in addition, where appropriate, are prepared to provide comprehensive and intensive psychotherapy over an extended period of time in more complex cases. Sex therapy can help resolve various sexual issues, from concerns about sexual function or feelings that affect one’s sex life to the way one relates to a partner. Sex therapy may address: concerns about sexual desire or arousal, concerns about sexual interests or sexual orientation, sex addiction or compulsive sexual behavior, erectile dysfunction, premature ejaculation, trouble reaching orgasm (anorgasmia), painful intercourse (dyspareunia), intimacy issues related to a disability or chronic condition. Sex therapists tend to have much greater than average knowledge about the physiological processes that are a part of human sexuality.
