= Marta Meana =

Spanish-American psychologist and academic

- Born: 1957 (age 68–69); Madrid, Spain
- Education: McGill University (BA, BA, MA, PhD)
- Occupations: Psychologist; Academic
- Employer: University of Nevada, Las Vegas
- Known for: Research on female sexuality and sexual health
- Title: Acting President of the University of Nevada, Las Vegas
- Predecessor: Len Jessup
- Successor: Keith E. Whitfield

Marta Meana (born 1957) is a Spanish-American psychologist known for her work on female sexuality and sexual health. She served as a professor and acting president at the University of Nevada, Las Vegas.

== Early life and education ==
Meana was born in Madrid, Spain, in 1957. She earned two Bachelor of Arts degrees—one in Psychology and one in English Literature—as well as a Master of Arts in English Literature and a Ph.D. in Clinical Psychology, all from McGill University in Montreal, Canada. Her dissertation was titled Deconstructing Dyspareunia: Description, Classification and Biopsychosocial Correlates of a Pain Disorder.

== Career ==
Meana served as a professor of psychology at the University of Nevada, Las Vegas (UNLV) from 1997 until her retirement in 2024.

Her primary area of research focuses on sexual desire and sexual pain disorders in women, approached from both essentialist and social constructivist perspectives. She has been first or lead author on over 60 academic articles related to sexual health and has co-authored dozens more.

Meana is listed as an advisor to the DSM-5 Task Force on Sexual Desires according to her biography,. Her name does not appear on the official DSM-5 Task Force subgroup member lists or in published commentaries considered by the committee.

Meana has contributed to academic discussions on the theory of autogynephilia, a controversial hypothesis related to transgender identity. Some of her editorial and research contributions have been cited in scholarly critiques of the theory.

The theory itself has been the subject of debate in the field of psychology and among transgender advocacy groups. Critics argue that autogynephilia pathologizes transgender women and may contribute to social stigma. These criticisms are not specifically directed at Meana’s work, but reflect broader controversies surrounding the concept.

== Professional affiliations ==
- Acting President of UNLV (2018–2020)
- President of the Society for Sex Therapy and Research (SSTAR) from 2011 to 2013

== Awards ==
- 2018: SSTAR Masters and Johnson Lifetime Achievement Award
- 2015: Nevada Psychological Association James Mikawa Award
- 2013: UNLV Barrick Distinguished Scholar Award

She is a Fellow of the Society for the Scientific Study of Sexuality.
