= Laurie Mintz =

American psychologist and sex therapist

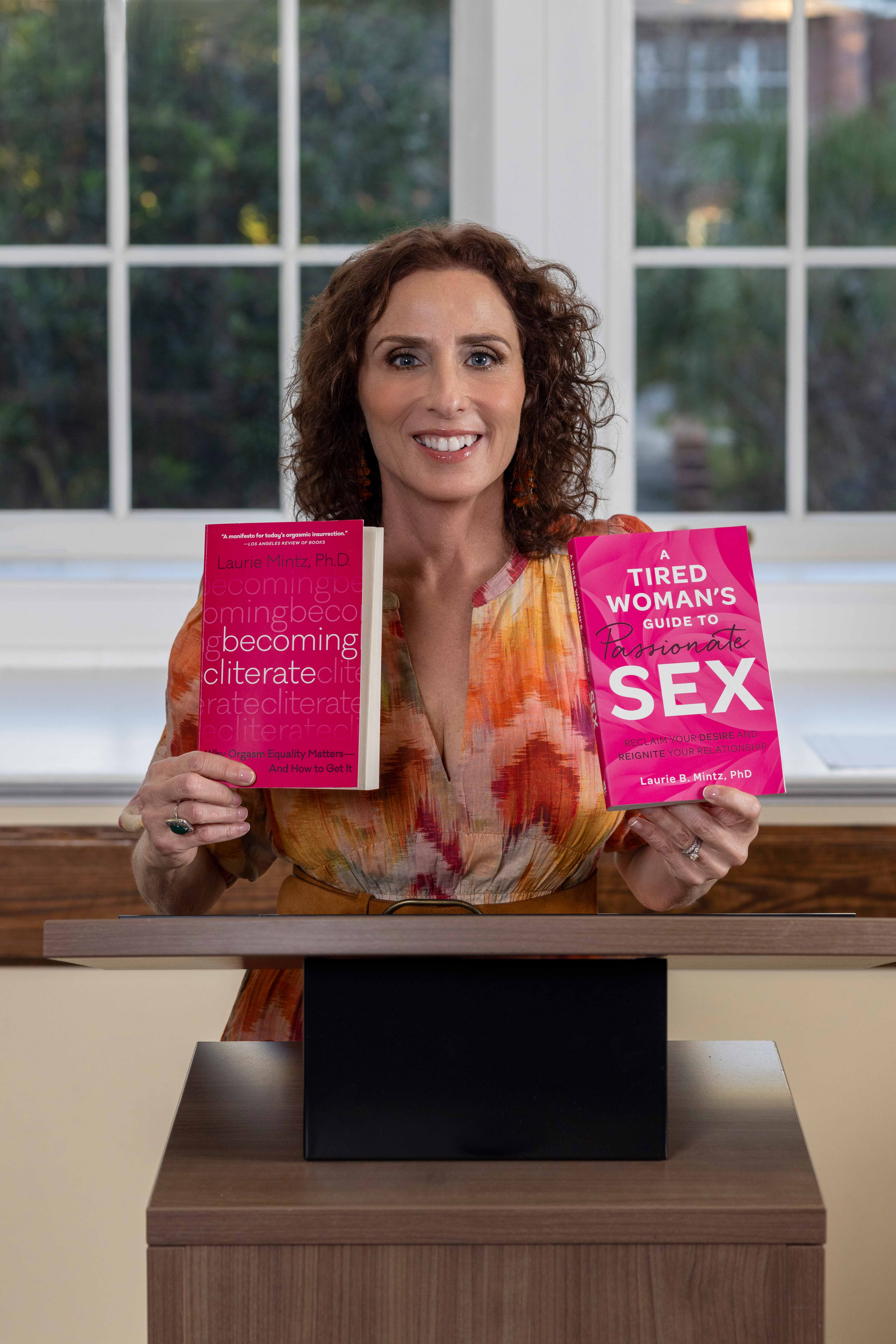
- Education: Union College (New York) (BS) Ohio State University (MA, PhD)
- Occupations: Psychologist, sex therapist, professor emerita, author
- Notable work: A Tired Woman's Guide to Passionate Sex (2009) Becoming Cliterate: Why Orgasm Equality Matters—And How to Get It (2017)

Laurie Mintz is an American psychologist, sex therapist, and professor emerita in the Department of Psychology at the University of Florida. She authored A Tired Woman's Guide to Passionate Sex (2009) and Becoming Cliterate: Why Orgasm Equality Matters and How to Get It (2017). Mintz has published over 50 peer-reviewed research articles in psychology and sex therapy and is a Fellow of the American Psychological Association. In 2023, she was named to Forbes' "50 Over 50 – Innovation" list.

== Early life and education ==
During her undergraduate years, she co-founded the campus Woman's Network (now the Women's Union), volunteered at a local rape crisis center, and served as a Big Sister to local youth. She then completed an M.A. (1984) and PhD (1987) in counseling psychology at Ohio State University.

== Career ==
Mintz joined the University of Florida faculty in October 2011 after spending 21 years at the University of Missouri–Columbia, where she was promoted from assistant to full professor and served five years as Training Director for the American Psychological Association-accredited Counseling Psychology program. Mintz has also worked in private practice for over 30 years, providing therapy to individuals and couples for both general mental health and sexual concerns.

== Books ==
Mintz's first trade title, A Tired Woman's Guide to Passionate Sex (2009), explores psychological approaches to addressing low sexual desire among women.

Her second book, Becoming Cliterate: Why Orgasm Equality Matters—And How to Get It, was published by HarperOne

== Awards and honors ==
- Forbes "50 Over 50 – Innovation" honoree (2023)
- Consumer Book Award, Society for Sex Therapy and Research (2019) for Becoming Cliterate.
