= Wulf H. Utian =

South African physician

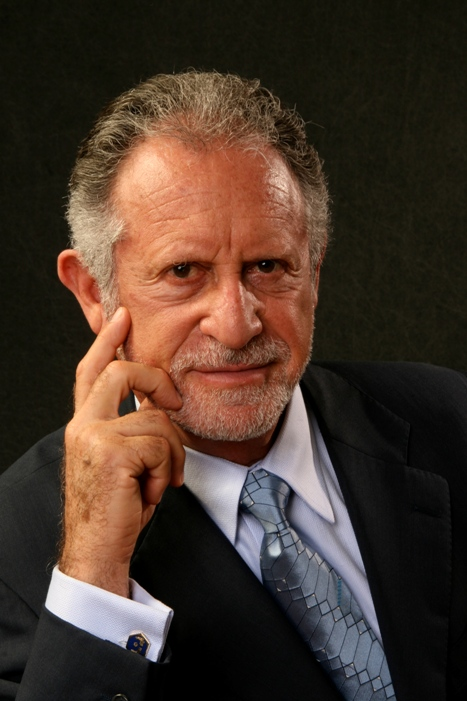
- Citizenship: American
- Education: MD and PhD
- Alma mater: University of the Witwatersrand and University of Cape Town
- Occupations: Medical Reproductive Endocrinologist, clinical researcher, and academic department administrator
- Known for: Discovery of menopause as a medical condition
- Title: Arthur H. Bill Professor Emeritus of Reproductive Biology
- Spouse: Moira Utian
- Website: Official website

Wulf H. Utian is a physician, reproductive endocrinologist, clinical researcher, and academic women's health department administrator. He is best known for first recognizing menopause as a potential health-related issue. He is the co-founder of the International Menopause Society and founder of the North American Menopause Society. Previously he has worked as a medical department Director at the Mount Sinai Medical Center, the University Hospitals of Cleveland, and academic chairman of the department of Reproductive Biology at Case Western Reserve University School of Medicine. He is currently the Arthur H. Bill Professor Emeritus of Reproductive Biology at the Case Western Reserve University School of Medicine, a consultant in women's health, and Scientific Director Emeritus of Rapid Medical Research Inc.

== Education ==
Utian received an MD from the University of the Witwatersrand and a PhD from the University of Cape Town. He also received a DSc degree in medicine in 2007, becoming only the eleventh recipient of the degree in 100 years.

== Career in South Africa ==
Utian is credited for describing menopause as a potential health-related issue in 1967. He has described the situation that led to his discovery as occurring when he was invited to visit a large pharmaceutical firm in West Berlin. He has stated that "A new female hormone was mentioned and thereby started my interest in the subject. Upon my return [home] I approached the Chairman of the Department of Gynaecology of the University of Cape Town ... and spelled out my plans for a menopause clinic." This clinic, named the Femininity Clinic (later renamed the Mature Woman Clinic), was the first of its kind in the world, located at the Groote Schuur Hospital. In 1976 he also became one of the three co-founders of the International Menopause Society. Utian ultimately left South Africa due to conflicts with the Apartheid government, including his objections to the treatment of non-white physicians in the country's hospitals.

== Career in Cleveland ==
Utian ran the South African clinic until his move to Cleveland Ohio in 1976, where he began to work for the University Hospitals of Cleveland and Case Western Reserve University School of Medicine. He then served as Director of Obstetrics and Gynaecology at the Mount Sinai Hospital of Cleveland. In 1982 he began performing In vitro fertilisations, becoming one of the first medical doctors in the US to do so.

In 1985 he became the first physician to successfully complete the in vitro fertilization of a surrogate mother without using an egg from the surrogate mother. Utian's team instead removed eggs from the ovaries of a woman whose uterus had been removed, fertilized them with her husband's sperm, and implanted the fertilized eggs into the womb of a surrogate mother. Utian reported the event to the New England Journal of Medicine in a published letter announcing it as the world's first successful effort of this kind. All previous surrogate pregnancies had used an egg from the surrogate mother instead of the woman unable to have children. The baby was also the world's first baby where a court in Michigan determined that the genetic mother and not the birth mother was the one who should be listed on the birth certificate (the first baby in the world where the women who gave birth was not recognized as the mother). The story was featured on the cover of Life magazine and on Nova.

Utian became the director of the Department of Obstetrics and Gynaecology at the University Hospitals of Cleveland and Chairman of Reproductive Biology at Case Western Reserve University in 1989, staying in the position until 1999. In 1989 Utian also became the Executive director and founder of the North American Menopause Society, located in Cleveland, Ohio. He also served as the editor of the society's scientific journal Menopause. He has additionally served as the President of the International Menopause Society. In 1998 he became the founding Secretary of the Council of Affiliated Menopause Societies. Utian retired from the head of the North American Menopause Society in 2009.

Utian left academic department administration after twenty years service to continue as a medical practitioner at the Cleveland Clinic, and clinical research scientist at Rapid Medical Research, which he founded in 1997. He also served as a professor of obstetrics and gynaecology at Case Western Reserve University, where he is now Arthur H. Bill Professor Emeritus of Reproductive Biology. Utian served as the Medical Editor of Maturitas from 1983-1993, was named Honorary Founding Editor of Menopause (1994-2010), and served as Editor of Menopause Management between 1987 and 2009.

== Views on menopause ==
In 1976 Utian co-determined the first internationally accepted definitions of menopause and time-related events. In 1985 Utian publicly disagreed with the medical definition of menopause agreed upon by the International Menopause Society. He believed menopause to be a potential endocrinopathy (disease of the endocrine system), with potential adverse physical effects on pelvic and extra-pelvic organs such as bone, cardiovascular system, brain, skin and sensory organs. He has written that menopause has been recognized by society as a stage of life as far back as Biblical times. Utian has stated that the symptoms women experience when their ovaries shut down are due to an evolutionary lag, as the endocrine system of the human female has not kept pace with the increase in life expectancy human beings have experienced recently. Utian is known as the world's most prolific author of studies in the field of menopause, including 26 authored or co-authored articles during the first ten years of the field's existence and more than 200 over his career.

== Bibliography of major works ==
- "Feminine Forever? Current Concepts on the Menopause", Utian's first article on menopause (South African Journal of Obstetrics and Gynaecology, 1968)
- The Menopause Manual - A Woman's Guide to the Menopause (MTP Press, 1978)
- Menopause in Modern Perspective (Appleton-Century-Crofts, 1980)
- Your Middle Years: A Doctor's Guide for Today's Woman (Appleton-Century-Crofts, 1980)
- The Premenstrual Syndrome, coauthored with Pieter van Keep (MTP Press, 1981)
- The Controversial Climacteric, coauthored with Pieter van Keep and Alex Vermuelen (MTP Press, 1982)
- Managing Your Menopause, coauthored with Ruth S. Jacobowitz (Prentice Hall, 1990)
- The Menopause and Hormonal Replacement Therapy: Facts and Controversies, coauthored with Regine Sitruk-Ware (Marcel Dekker, 1991)
- The Utian Strategy: Is this my problem or is this your problem? (Self-published on Utian Press, 2010)
- Is this my problem or yours? The Utian Strategy (Self-published on Utian Press, 2020)
- Change Your Menopause: Why One Size Does Not Fit All (Self-published on Utian Press, 2010, 2016)
