= William J. Taverner =

Editor of the American Journal of Sexuality Education

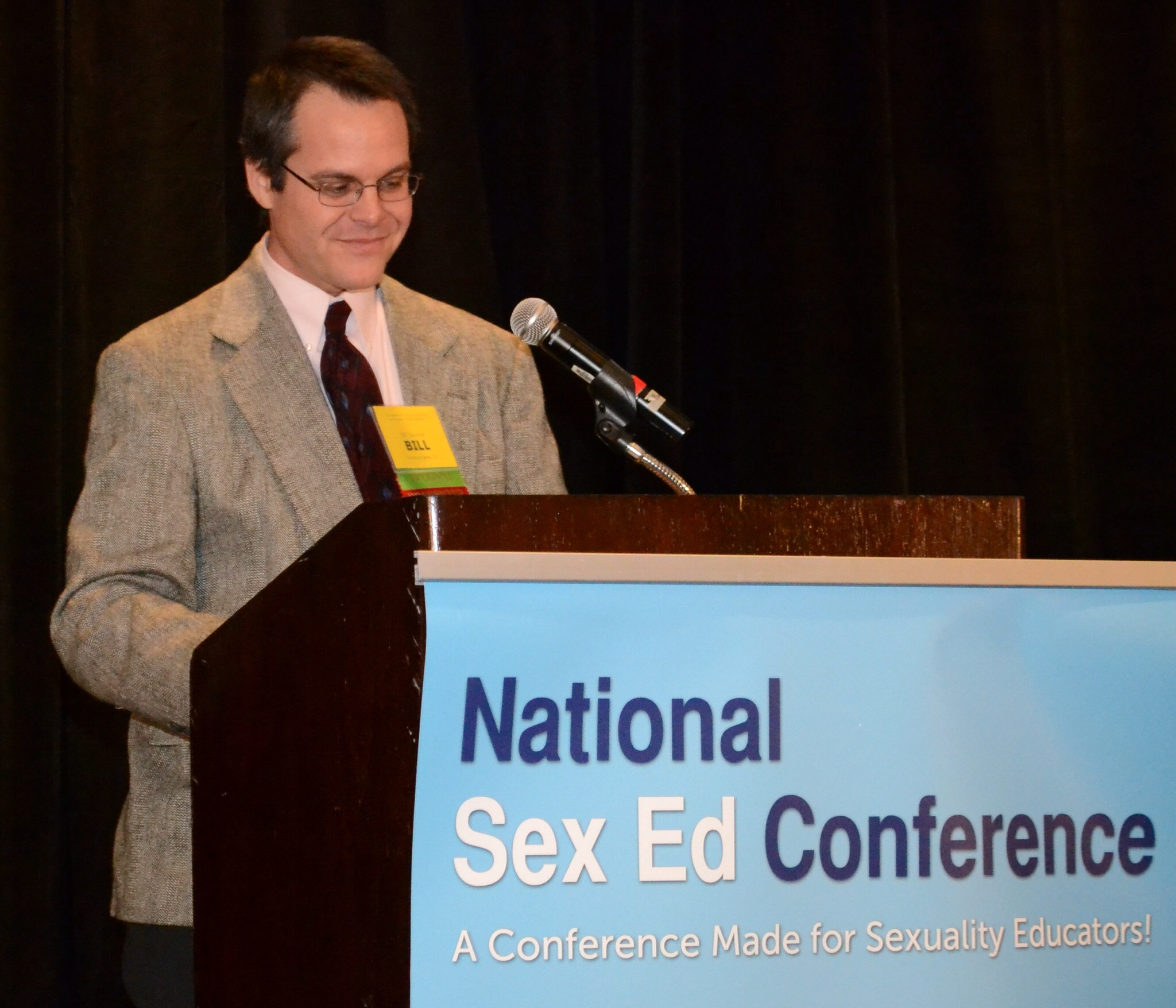
Taverner in 2014.

William J. Taverner, MA, commonly known as Bill Taverner, is the editor of the American Journal of Sexuality Education and the executive director of the Center for Sex Education (CSE). He has co-authored numerous sexuality education manuals, including All Together Now: Teaching about Contraception and Safer Sex, Making Sense of Abstinence: Lessons for Comprehensive Sex Education, Positive Images: Teaching Abstinence, Contraception, and Sexual Health, Streetwise to Sex-Wise: Sexuality Education for High-Risk Youth, and Older, Wiser, Sexually Smarter.

As a trainer, Taverner presents such topics as “Unequal Partners,” and "Making sense of abstinence," training thousands of educators, counselors, social workers, nurses, therapists, and other professionals. He frequently trains early-childhood professionals, helping them respond to young children’s sexual questions and behaviors, And in 2008, he gave an address at a congressional briefing advocating for sex education.

Before joining the CFLE in 1998, Taverner served as the sexuality educator and trainer for Phoenix House, where he developed Sexuality and Substance Abuse, a comprehensive sexuality education program (for people in recovery from substance abuse) and training program (for their counseling staff). Prior to Phoenix House, he worked with people with developmental disabilities, and co-authored the Verbal Informed Sexual Consent Assessment Tool, to help measure an individual’s capacity to give informed sexual consent.

Taverner is the editor of the eighth, ninth, and tenth editions of Taking Sides: Clashing Views on Controversial Issues in Human Sexuality, and co-authored the fifth through seventh, and eleventh through thirteenth editions of this college reader. He served as a contributing author to the International Encyclopedia of Sexuality, co-author of Older, Wiser, Sexually Smarter and his newest publications include the fourth edition of Positive Images: Teaching about Contraception and Sexual Health and the two-volume third edition of Teaching Safer Sex, which won the 2013 AASECT Book Award.

Taverner has received the 2006 "Golden Apple Award," given by the Association for Planned Parenthood Leaders in Education (APPLE), and a 2006 national award given by the online journal "Sexual Intelligence".

Formerly an adjunct professor of human sexuality at Fairleigh Dickinson University, Taverner received his Master of Arts degree in human sexuality from New York University.

== Bibliography ==
=== Books ===
- Representation in Sex Education: Cultivating Diversity, Equity, Inclusion, and Belonging, with Tanya M. Bass. The Center for Sex Education, 2024.
- Sex Education Research: A Look Between the Sheets. Routledge, 2023.
- Teaching Safer Sex: Abridged Edition:. The Center for Sex Education, 2020.
- How I Got into Sex…Ed, with Karen Rayne and Catherine Dukes, 2014.
- Taking Sides: Clashing Views in Human Sexuality, 13th ed., with Ryan W. McKee. McGraw-Hill, 2013.
- Positive Images, 4th Ed., with Peggy Brick, Carolyn Cooperman, Lizbeth Cruz, Melissa Keyes DiGioia, and Susan Milstein. The Center for Family Life Education, 2013.
- Teaching Safer Sex, 3rd ed., vols. 1 & 2, with Susan Milstein & Sue Montfort. The Center for Family Life Education, 2012.
- Taking Sides: Clashing Views in Human Sexuality, 12th ed., with Ryan W. McKee. McGraw-Hill, 2011.
- Taking Sides: Clashing Views in Human Sexuality, 11th ed., with Ryan W. McKee. McGraw-Hill, 2009.
- Older, Wiser, Sexually Smarter: 30 Sex Ed Lessons for Adults Only, with Peggy Brick, Jan Lunquist, and Allyson Sandak. The Center for Family Life Education, 2009.
- The Business of Education: Accountability in the Mission of Planned Parenthood, with Mary Gossert, Rebecca Holbrook, Terri Lind, Michael McGee, Cory Neering, and Pierette Silverman. Planned Parenthood Federation of America (PPFA), 2007.
- Taking Sides: Clashing Views in Human Sexuality, 10th ed.. McGraw-Hill, 2007.
- Verbal Informed Sexual Consent Assessment Tool, with Christopher DeMarco.
- Sex Ed 101: A Collection of Sex Education Lessons. The Center for Family Life Education, 2006.
- All Together Now: Teaching about Contraception and Safer Sex, with Linda Potter, Melissa Keyes DiGioia, and Sue Montfort. PPFA, 2006.
- Making Sense of Abstinence: Lessons for Comprehensive Sex Education. The Center for Family Life Education, 2005.
- Taking Sides: Clashing Views in Human Sexuality, 9th ed.. McGraw-Hill, 2005.
- Educating about Abortion, 2nd ed., with Peggy Brick. The Center for Family Life Education, 2002.
- Taking Sides: Clashing Views in Human Sexuality, 8th ed.. McGraw-Hill, 2002.
- Positive Images: Teaching about Abstinence, Contraception, and Sexual Health, 3rd ed., with Peggy Brick. The Center for Family Life Education, 2001.
- Educating about Abortion, with Peggy Brick. The Center for Family Life Education, 2001.
- Streetwise to Sex-Wise: Sexuality Education for High-Risk Youth, 2nd Ed., with Steve Brown. The Center for Family Life Education, 2001.
- Taking Sides: Clashing Views in Human Sexuality, 7th ed., with Robert T. Francoeur. McGraw-Hill, 2000.
- Taking Sides: Clashing Views in Human Sexuality, 6th ed., with Robert T. Francoeur. McGraw-Hill, 1998.
- Sexuality and Substance Abuse. Phoenix House Foundation, 1997.
- Sexuality and Recovery: Theme Group Handbook. Phoenix House Foundation, 1995.

=== Textbook/encyclopedia chapters ===
- The Right to Pass in Taking Sides: Clashing Views in Family and Personal Relationships, by David M. Hall. McGraw-Hill, 2009.
- You Want Me to Say What??? Helping Parents Teach Their Young Children about Sexuality in Sexuality Education: Past, Present, Future Issues, by Elizabeth Schroeder and Judy Kuriansky. Greenwood/Praeger Publishing, 2009.
- A Contraceptive Revolution? in the United States chapter of The Continuum Complete International Encyclopedia of Sexuality, by Robert T. Francoeur and Raymond J. Noonan. Continuum, 2004.
- Sexuality Education in the United States in the United States chapter of The Continuum Complete International Encyclopedia of Sexuality, by Robert T. Francoeur and Ray Noonan. Continuum, 2004.
- “Childhood Sexuality,” entry chapter in The Encyclopedia of Human Sexuality, edited by P. Welehan & A. Bolin. Singapore: Wiley-Blackwell. 2013.

=== Academic journal articles ===
- American Journal of Sexuality Education. Editor-in-Chief.
- "Making Sense of Abstinence," in American Journal of Sexuality Education, 6(4), 2012.
- "Touring the World of Sexuality Education: A Review of Sexuality Education: Past, Present, and Future," by E. Schroeder & J. Kuriansky (Eds.) Review co-authored with Joan Garrity, Robert Selverstone, and Pamela Wilson in PsycCRITIQUES, 55(26), 2010.
- "Sex Ed in the USA," in News Bulletin: International Society for Sexual Medicine, March, 2008.
- "Inside the Sex Ed Studio: An Interview with Peggy Brick," in American Journal of Sexuality Education, 3(3), 2008.
- "Reclaiming 'Abstinence' in Comprehensive Sex Education," in Contemporary Sexuality, 41(4), 2006.
- "Inside the Sex Ed Studio: An Interview with Susan N. Wilson," in American Journal of Sexuality Education, 2(1), 2006.
- "Sexual Health in Prime Time," in American Journal of Sexuality Education, 1(4), 2006.
- "Tips for Emerging Sexology Professionals: Networking and Nurturing," in Contemporary Sexuality, 40(2), 2006.
- "Unplanned Pregnancy: Making a Decision," with Peggy Brick, in American Journal of Sexuality Education, 1(3), 2006.
- "Teaching Safer Sex: In English and en Espanol," with Lizbeth Cruz and Jescenia Oviedo, in SIECUS Report, 32(1), 2004.
- "All Together Now: Combining Pregnancy and STI Prevention Programs,"in SIECUS Report, 31(3), 2003.

=== Newspaper editorials ===
- "Tiger Woods Bogeyed His Televised Apology," The Morning Call, February 26, 2010.
- "The Shot Heard 'Round My Family," Staten Island Advance, August 18, 2010.
