= Sensate focus =

Sex therapy technique

Sensate focus is a sex therapy technique introduced by the Masters and Johnson team. It works by refocusing the participants on their own sensory perceptions and sensuality, instead of goal-oriented behavior focused on the genitals and penetrative sex. Sensate focus has been used to treat problems with body image, erectile dysfunction, orgasm disorders, and lack of sexual arousal.

== Method ==
The exercises are conducted by the couple at home, between therapy sessions. Although the couple are nude or in underwear and touching each other during the exercises, they are instructed to abstain from sexual intercourse during or close to the sessions. Both participants are instructed instead to focus on their own varied sense experience, instead of focusing on performance or orgasm. Initially, the emphasis is on touching in a mindful way for oneself without regard for sexual response or pleasure for oneself or one's partner. A sex therapist will usually guide the timing and technique of the sensate focusing. In the first stage, the couple may touch each other's bodies excluding breasts and genitals. They are encouraged to enjoy and become increasingly aware of the warmth, texture and other qualities of their partner's skin. Participants attend to whatever they find interesting in each other, rather than attend to what they think the other wants.

Contact with the breasts, or male or female genitalia is banned at least for the first initial session, but other aspects of intimacy are explored: touching, talking, hugging, kissing, and so on. This includes taste, smell, and sound, as partners are encouraged to talk to each other, to express emotion, and to encourage each other.

The aim here is to minimize pressure and expectations, and to appreciate new sensual possibilities. Patients often report an improvement in their sex life generally with less anxiety. As the man reports increasing awareness and attention paid to these holistic sense aspects of sex, potency often returns. This works well for women too. Women report more sensation in their vagina, and lubrication.

The second stage increases the touch options to include breasts. Sensation and gathering information about the partner's body is still encouraged and intercourse and touching of the genitals is still forbidden. The participants then use a technique of placing their hand over their partner's hand in order to show what they find pleasurable in terms of pace and pressure. Even though the methodology stresses that that this is not the goal, these exercises can lead to an improved ability to provide a pleasurable experience to a partner. Further stages gradually re-introduce touching of breasts and genitals, then intercourse. Orgasm is never the focus.

This is also used as a treatment for impotence in males, and arousal difficulties, especially where anxiety is involved. In psychosexual therapy practice, sensate focus is considered particularly effective for psychogenic erectile dysfunction, where performance anxiety and self-monitoring during sexual activity are the primary maintaining factors. Because of performance anxiety in men, the obsessional focus on the penis can result in impotence. The therapist will encourage the man to forget about his penis, and forget about his partner's genitals, and instead concentrate on the sensual possibilities available in the feel of his own and his partner's skin, hair, mouth, body, (breasts), etc.
