= Becoming Cliterate: Why Orgasm Equality Matters—And How to Get It =

2017 non-fiction book by Laurie Mintz

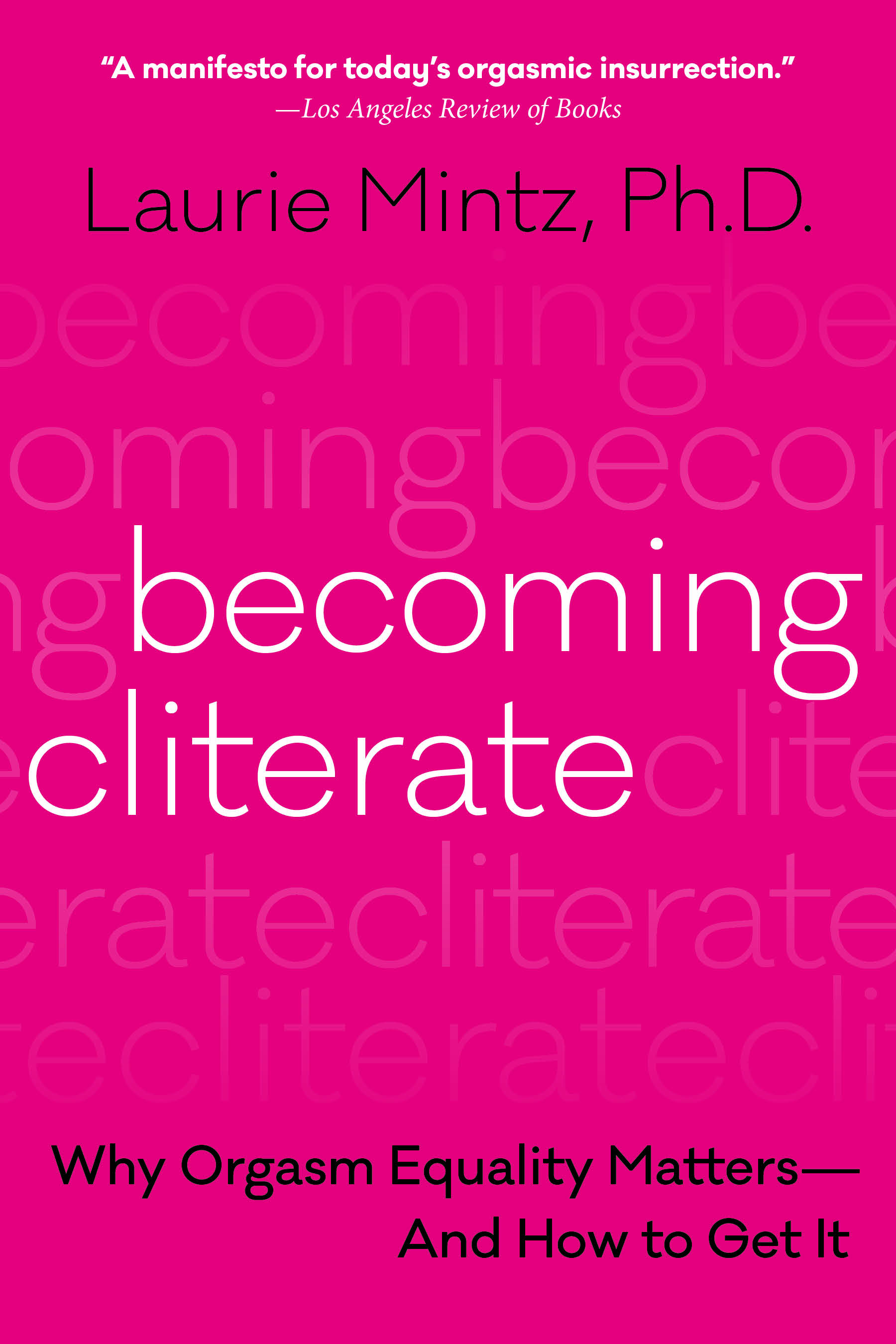
- Author: Laurie Mintz
- Language: English
- Publisher: HarperOne
- Publication date: May 9, 2017
- Publication place: USA
- ISBN: 978-0062484383

Becoming Cliterate: Why Orgasm Equality Matters—And How to Get It is a non-fiction book by psychologist and sex educator Laurie Mintz, published in 2017. The book addresses the topic of the orgasm gap, its causes, and how to overcome it.

The book was published by HarperOne, an imprint of HarperCollins, on May 9, 2017.

== Summary ==
Becoming Cliterate: Why Orgasm Equality Matters—and How to Get includes a detailed section on female anatomy, a review of misconceptions about the female orgasm, and practical techniques aimed at improving sexual experiences. The book advocates for a more informed and equitable approach to sexual intimacy, aiming to shift both individual behaviors and broader societal attitudes. It received positive reviews for its accessible and research-based approach to female sexuality.

== Recognition ==
Becoming Cliterate received the 2019 Consumer Book Award from the Society for Sex Therapy and Research.
