= Pain (journal) =

- Discipline: Anesthesiology
- Language: English
- Edited by: Karen D. Davis

Publication details
- History: 1975-present
- Publisher: Lippincott Williams & Wilkins on behalf of the International Association for the Study of Pain
- Frequency: Monthly
- Impact factor: 7.926 (2021)

Standard abbreviations
- ISO 4: Pain

Indexing
- CODEN: PAINDB
- ISSN: 0304-3959 (print); 1872-6623 (web)
- LCCN: 76646874
- OCLC no.: 2962157

Links
- Journal homepage; Online access; Online archive; Journal page at publisher's website

Pain is a monthly peer-reviewed medical journal published by Lippincott Williams & Wilkins on behalf of the International Association for the Study of Pain. The journal was established in 1975 and covers research and reviews in the fields of pain medicine, anesthesiology and clinical neurology. The editor-in-chief is Karen D. Davis (Krembil Research Institute).

== Abstracting and indexing ==
The journal is abstracted and indexed in:

- BIOSIS
- Behavioral Medicine Abstracts
- Current Contents/Clinical Medicine
- Current Contents/Life Sciences
- EMBASE
- Index Medicus
- MEDLINE/PubMed
- PsycINFO/Psychological Abstracts
- Scopus

According to the Journal Citation Reports, the journal has a 2018 impact factor of 6.029.
