= South African Journal of Obstetrics and Gynaecology =

- Discipline: Obstetrics and gynaecology
- Language: English
- Edited by: William Edridge

Publication details
- History: 1968, 1970-1972, 1999-present
- Publisher: South African Medical Association (South Africa)
- Frequency: Biannual
- Open access: Yes
- License: CC-BY-NC 4.0

Standard abbreviations
- ISO 4: S. Afr. J. Obstet. Gynaecol.
- NLM: S Afr J Obstet Gynaecol (1999)

Indexing
- ISSN: 0038-2329 (print); 2305-8862 (web)
- LCCN: 00-243525
- OCLC no.: 45320096

Links
- Journal homepage; Journal archive

The South African Journal of Obstetrics and Gynaecology is a biannual peer-reviewed open access medical journal published by the South African Medical Association. It was formerly published as a supplement to the South African Medical Journal.

== Abstracting and indexing ==
The journal is abstracted and indexed in:

- CAB Abstracts
- EBSCO databases
- Embase
- Emerging Sources Citation Index
- Scopus
