= Julia Heiman =

American sexologist and psychologist

- Education: Arizona State University (BA); Stony Brook University (PhD)
- Occupations: Sexologist, psychologist
- Scientific career
- Fields: Sexology, psychology

Julia R. Heiman is an American sexologist and psychologist. The sixth Director of The Kinsey Institute for Research in Sex, Gender, and Reproduction at Indiana University, she began on June 1, 2004. Heiman is also a professor in the Psychology Department at Indiana University with a joint appointment in the Psychiatry Department at the IU School of Medicine in Indianapolis.

== Life and career ==
Heiman received a Bachelor of Arts (Psychology) in 1970 from Arizona State University, Tempe, Arizona, then a PhD in Clinical Psychology in 1975 from State University of New York at Stony Brook. She performed a predoctoral internship from 1972 to 1974 at the Stony Brook Psychological Center and Patchogue-Medford School District. She received postgraduate training as a National Institute of Mental Health funded postdoctoral research associate in 1975 from the Department of Psychiatry and Behavioral Sciences at the State University of New York at Stony Brook. She co-authored the self-help book Becoming Orgasmic with Joseph LoPiccolo in 1976. She is an elected Fellow of the Society for the Scientific Study of Sexuality.

== Research ==
Heiman's research is concerned with the physiological and emotional dimensions of sexuality. Her research interests include treatments for sexual difficulty, the impact of treatments for sexual difficulty on relationships, cross-cultural definitions of sexual satisfaction, sexual abuse and aggression, depression and sex, quality of sex experience in the wake of cancer, impact of childhood sexual abuse on adult relationships, and sexual risk taking.

== Selected publications ==
- Heiman J, LoPiccolo L, LoPiccolo J (1976). Becoming Orgasmic: A Sexual and Personal Growth Program for Women. Prentice-Hall, ISBN 978-0-13-072652-0
- Heiman J, LoPiccolo J (1987). Becoming Orgasmic: A Sexual and Personal Growth Program for Women, (Rev Exp edition). Fireside, ISBN 978-0-671-76177-6
