= Joseph LoPiccolo (psychology) =

American psychologist and sex researcher (1943-2019)

Joseph LoPiccolo (1943 – 2019) was an American psychologist and sex researcher who focuses on female sexual response. He coauthored the self-help book Becoming Orgasmic with Julia Heiman and served on the Subcommittee on Sexual Dysfunctions for the DSM-III-R. He was Professor Emeritus of Psychological Sciences at the University of Missouri in Columbia, Missouri, where previously served as chair of the department.

== Life and career ==
LoPiccolo earned his Ph.D. from Yale University in 1969. That year, he took a position at University of Oregon. In 1974 he moved to the Department of Psychiatry at Stony Brook University.

In 1976 he produced the film 'Becoming Orgasmic,' based on research into assisting women with difficulties reaching orgasm. The film led to a 1976 book version co-authored with Julia Heiman, titled Becoming Orgasmic: A Sexual and Personal Growth Program for Women.

In a study funded by the National Institute of Mental Health, LoPiccolo found that low sex drive among men was far more common than previously thought, and he credited the feminist movement with reducing the percentage of anorgasmic women.

He taught at Texas A&M from 1984 to 1988 before taking an appointment that year at University of Missouri. Since becoming an emeritus professor, he continued to write reviews and articles.

== Selected publications ==
- LoPiccolo J, Lobitz WC (1972). The role of masturbation in the treatment of orgasmic dysfunction. Archives of Sexual Behavior 1972 Dec;2(2):163-71. PMID 4680816
- Lobitz WC, LoPiccolo J (1972). New methods in the behavioral treatment of sexual dysfunction. Journal of Behavior Therapy and Experimental Psychiatry Volume 3, Issue 4, December 1972, Pages 265-271 doi:10.1016/0005-7916(72)90047-X
- LoPiccolo J, Steger JC (1974). The sexual interaction inventory: A new instrument for assessment of sexual dysfunction. Archives of Sexual Behavior 1974 Nov;3(6):585-95. PMID 4429442
- Heiman J, LoPiccolo L, LoPiccolo J (1976). Becoming Orgasmic: A Sexual and Personal Growth Program for Women. Prentice-Hall, ISBN 978-0-13-072652-0
- LoPiccolo J, LoPiccolo L, Eds. (1978). Handbook of sex therapy. Plenum Press, ISBN 978-0-306-31074-4
- Schover LR, Friedman JM, Weiler SJ, Heiman JR, LoPiccolo J (1982). Multiaxial Problem-Oriented System for Sexual Dysfunctions: An Alternative to DSM-III. Arch Gen Psychiatry 1982;39(5):614-619. PMID 7092493
- De Amicis LA, Goldberg DC, LoPiccolo J, Friedman J, Davies L (1985). Clinical follow-up of couples treated for sexual dysfunction. Archives of Sexual Behavior 1985 Dec;14(6):467-89. PMID 4084048
- LoPiccoloJ, Stock WE (1986). Treatment of sexual dysfunction Journal of Consulting and Clinical Psychology, Journal of Consulting and Clinical Psychology, Volume 54, Issue 2, April 1986, Pages 158-167 doi:10.1037/0022-006X.54.2.158
- Heiman J, LoPiccolo J (1987). Becoming Orgasmic: A Sexual and Personal Growth Program for Women, (Rev Exp edition). Fireside, ISBN 978-0-671-76177-6
