= Sexual and Gender Diversity in Social Services =

- Discipline: Sexology
- Language: English
- Edited by: Shelley Craig, Peter A. Newman

Publication details
- Former name(s): Journal of Gay and Lesbian Social Services
- History: 1994–present
- Publisher: Routledge
- Frequency: Quarterly
- Open access: Hybrid
- Impact factor: 1.5 (2022)

Standard abbreviations
- ISO 4: Sex. Gend. Divers. Soc. Serv.

Indexing
- ISSN: 2993-3021 (print); 2993-303X (web)
- LCCN: 2023201332
- Journal of Gay and Lesbian Social Services
- ISSN: 1053-8720 (print); 1540-4056 (web)
- LCCN: 94659088
- OCLC no.: 22683509

Links
- Journal homepage; Online access; Online archive

Sexual and Gender Diversity in Social Services is a quarterly peer-reviewed academic journal that covers research related to sexual minorities and their social environment, including issues of homophobia and heterosexism and the personal, day-to-day experiences of people affected by these attitudes. The editors-in-chief are Shelley Craig and Peter A. Newman (both University of Toronto). The journal was established in 1994 as the Journal of Gay and Lesbian Social Services, obtaining its current name in 2024. The journal is affiliated with the American Association of Sexuality Educators, Counselors, and Therapists, Society for the Psychological Study of Lesbian, Gay, Bisexual, and Transgender Issues (Division 44 of the American Psychological Association), Society for the Scientific Study of Sexuality, and the Caucus of LGBT Faculty and Students in Social Work, whose members can obtain the journal at a special society member rate.

== Abstracting and indexing ==
The journal is abstracted and indexed in:

- EBSCO databases
- Emerging Sources Citation Index
- International Bibliography of Periodical Literature
- ProQuest databases
- PsycINFO
- Scopus

According to the Journal Citation Reports, the journal has a 2022 impact factor of 1.5.
