= Journal of Homosexuality =

- Discipline: Sexology, queer studies
- Language: English
- Edited by: John Elia

Publication details
- History: 1976–present
- Publisher: Routledge
- Frequency: Monthly
- Impact factor: 1.369 (2016)

Standard abbreviations
- ISO 4: J. Homosex.

Indexing
- CODEN: JOHOD7
- ISSN: 0091-8369 (print); 1540-3602 (web)
- LCCN: 74-78295
- OCLC no.: 01790856

Links
- Journal homepage; Online access; Online archive

The Journal of Homosexuality is a peer-reviewed academic journal covering research into sexual practices and gender roles in their cultural, historical, interpersonal, and modern social contexts.

== History ==
The founding editor-in-chief was Charles Silverstein. After the first volume, the journal was edited by John Paul De Cecco who stayed on for about 50 volumes. The current editor-in-chief is John Elia (San Francisco State University). The journal was originally published by the Haworth Press, until it was acquired by Taylor & Francis, who now publish it under their Routledge imprint.

== Abstracting and indexing ==
The journal is abstracted and indexed in the Social Sciences Citation Index, MEDLINE, Current Contents, PsycINFO, Sociological Abstracts, Social Work Abstracts, Abstracts in Anthropology, Criminal Justice Abstracts, Studies on Women & Gender Abstracts, AgeLine, and Education Research Abstracts. According to the Journal Citation Reports, the journal has a 2015 impact factor of 0.862.

== See also ==
- List of academic journals in sexology
