= PLISSIT model =

Modeling system in sexology

The PLISSIT model, also known as the PLISSIT model of sex therapy, is a modeling system used in the field of sexology to determine the different levels of intervention for individual clients. The model was created in 1976 by Jack S. Annon. The letters of the name refer to the four different levels of intervention that a sexologist can apply: permission (P), limited information (LI), specific suggestions (SS), and intensive therapy (IT). The model is also used outside the field of sexology, especially in fields involving extensive or life-threatening surgery.

== Structure ==
The model created by Annon has four levels of increasing intervention and interaction related to what kind of and how much help is given to a client. The varying levels largely revolve around what the client is looking for and how comfortable they are in discussing sexuality and sexual health.

The first level is permission, which involves the sexologist giving the client permission to feel comfortable about a topic or permission to change their lifestyle or to get medical assistance. This level was created because many clients only require the permission to speak and voice their concerns about sexual issues in order to understand and move past them, often without needing the other levels of the model. The sexologist, in acting as a receptive, nonjudgmental listening partner, allows the client to discuss matters that would otherwise be too embarrassing for the individual to discuss.

The second level is limited information, wherein the client is supplied with limited and specific information on the topics of discussion. Because there is a significant amount of information available, sexologists must learn what sexual topics the client wishes to discuss, so that information, organizations, and support groups for those specific subjects can be provided.

The third level is specific suggestions, where the sexologist gives the client suggestions related to the specific situations and assignments to do in order to help the client fix the mental or health problem. This can include suggestions on how to deal with sex related diseases or information on how to better achieve sexual satisfaction by the client changing their sexual behavior. The suggestions may be as simple as recommending exercise or can involve specific regimens of activity or medications.

The fourth and final level is intensive therapy, which has the sexologist refer the client to other mental and medical health professionals that can help the client deal with the deeper, underlying issues and concerns being expressed. This level, with the onset of the internet age, may also refer to a sexologist suggesting professional online resources for the client to browse about their specific issue in a more private setting.

=== EX-PLISSIT model ===
The PLISSIT model was extended in 2006 by Sally Davis and Bridget Taylor because of concerns that practitioners often bypass permission-giving and go straight to providing information (sometimes merely in the form of a leaflet), without giving patients the opportunity to express any concerns they might have. The extended model, named the EX-PLISSIT model, places permission-giving at the core. By giving people explicit permission to discuss any concerns they have about their sexuality, the healthcare professional affirms the individual as a sexual being. Any information or suggestions that follow, are then specific to the needs of that person.

The EX-PLISSIT model also requires further permission-giving in the form of 'review', whereby the healthcare professional asks the patient to review the interaction and is given the opportunity to express any further worries or concerns. In addition, this model requires the professional to reflect on their interactions, challenging assumptions and extending their knowledge.
