= Society for the Advancement of Sexual Health =

Nonprofit organisation

SASH
- Society for the Advancement of Sexual Health
- Formation: 1987
- Headquarters: Acworth, Georgia
- Location: United States
- Founder: Patrick Carnes
- Current President: Laney Knowlton
- Website: www.sash.net

The Society for the Advancement of Sexual Health (SASH) is a nonprofit organization focused on fostering a comprehensive approach to sexual health. SASH's mission is to advance sexual health through research, education, and intervention by addressing a wide spectrum, from problematic behaviors to healthy sexual expression. The organization promotes public and professional access to resources on sexual health, offers credentialing for clinicians, and supports research in areas like sexual wellness and trauma. Through conferences, publications, and other educational media, SASH provides platforms for professionals to collaborate and for communities to support positive sexual health practices.

The size of the SASH membership was estimated to be 575 individuals in 2006 and 630 members in 2012. The majority of the membership are professionals working in the field of sexual health or in fields related to sexual health. These members include sex therapists, educators, and researchers.

== History and overview ==
SASH was founded by Patrick Carnes in 1987, originally as the National Council on Sexual Addiction (NCSA). In 2003, they changed the name to Society for the Advancement of Sexual Health.

In 2010, the topic of "sex addiction" received widespread public attention following revelations about the personal life of golfer Tiger Woods. Patrick Carnes's work with Tiger Woods brought SASH into the public consciousness.

Starting in 2013, SASH shifted their policy and position statements away from the somewhat controversial topic of sex addiction, adopting a broader definition of problematic sexual behavior. The organization continued to provide training and resources to their members to keep abreast of changes in the research and evidence.

== Journal ==
SASH publishes a peer-reviewed, academic journal titled Sexual Health & Compulsivity, edited by Nicholas Borgogna. This journal is a key source for providing practicing clinicians useful and innovative strategies for intervention and treatment of sexual behaviors, which includes problematic/compulsive sexual behaviors. It aims to expand knowledge of sexual health with a particular focus on problematic/compulsive sexual behaviors across diverse clinical and non-clinical populations. The journal covers a broad perspective of sexual health, compulsive sexual behaviors, and their co-occurrence with other addictive and mental health disorders. Furthermore, the journal covers behavioral, epidemiological, and neurobiological methods used to assess factors contributing to the development and treatment of compulsive and addictive sexual behaviors (often referred to as sexual addiction, sexual compulsivity, and hypersexuality).

== Notable people ==
- Patrick Carnes, American counselor, author, and founder of SASH
