= American Journal of Sexuality Education =

- Discipline: Sex education
- Language: English
- Edited by: William J. Taverner

Publication details
- Former name(s): Journal of Sex Education and Therapy
- History: 1975–2001, 2005–present
- Publisher: Routledge (United States)
- Frequency: Quarterly

Standard abbreviations
- ISO 4: Am. J. Sex. Educ.

Indexing
- ISSN: 1554-6128 (print); 1554-6136 (web)
- LCCN: 2005212185
- OCLC no.: 58450353
- Journal of Sex Education and Therapy
- ISSN: 0161-4576

Links
- Journal homepage; Online access; Online archive; Online archive of the Journal of Sex Education and Therapy

The American Journal of Sexuality Education is a quarterly peer-reviewed academic journal established in 2005 and published by Routledge. It covers research on sex education. The editor-in-chief is William J. Taverner. It is an official journal of the American Association of Sexuality Educators, Counselors and Therapists.

== History ==
The journal was formerly published by Haworth Press, which was acquired by Routledge in 2007. From 1975 through 2001, the journal was named Journal of Sex Education and Therapy, with Gary F. Kelly serving as editor. It was relaunched in 2005 as the American Journal of Sexuality Education.

== Abstracting and indexing ==
The American Journal of Sexuality Education is abstracted and indexed in EBSCO databases, Emerging Sources Citation Index, PsycINFO, and Scopus.
