= Sex therapy =

Strategy for the treatment of sexual dysfunction

Sex therapy is a therapeutic strategy for the improvement of sexual function and treatment of sexual dysfunction. This includes dysfunctions such as premature ejaculation and delayed ejaculation, erectile dysfunction, lack of sexual interest or arousal, and painful sex (vaginismus and dyspareunia); as well as problems imposed by atypical sexual interests (paraphilias), gender dysphoria (and being transgender), highly overactive libido or hypersexuality, a lack of sexual confidence, and recovering from sexual abuse (such as rape or sexual assault); and also includes sexual issues related to aging, illness, or disability.

== Practice ==
Modern sex therapy often integrates psychotherapeutic techniques and medical ones, such as Viagra (sildenafil) and Cialis (tadalafil) to increase erectile response and Paxil (paroxetine) to treat premature ejaculation. Sex therapists assist those experiencing problems in overcoming them, in doing so possibly regaining an active and healthy sex life. The transformative approach to sex therapy aims to understand the psychological, biological, pharmacological, relational, and contextual aspects of sexual problems.

Sex therapy requires rigorous evaluation that includes a medical and psychological examination. The reason is that sexual dysfunction may have a somatic base or a psychogenic basis. A clear example is erectile dysfunction (sometimes still called "impotence"), whose causes may include circulatory problems and performance anxiety. Sex therapy is frequently short term, with duration depending on the causes for therapy.

Sex therapy can be provided by licensed psychologists or physicians who have undergone training and become certified. These trainings and certifications usually begin with a master's degree, and internship, and a license. This can take up to two years, and longer if a doctoral degree is desired.

Certified sex therapists do not have sexual contact with their clients. Sex therapy is distinct from sex surrogates. Whereas sex therapists discuss and instruct clients in sex-based exercises to be performed at home between sessions, sexual surrogates participate in the exercises with their clients as part of helping them to practice and develop improved skills. Therapists and surrogates sometimes collaborate on cases.

=== Symptoms ===
Sex therapy sessions are focused on the individual's symptoms rather than on underlying psychodynamic conflicts. The sexual dysfunctions which may be addressed by sex therapy include non-consummation, premature ejaculation, erectile dysfunction, low libido, unwanted sexual fetishes, sexual addiction, painful sex, or a lack of sexual confidence, assisting people who are recovering from sexual assault, problems commonly caused by stress, tiredness, and other environmental and relationship factors. Sex therapy can either be on an individual basis or with the sex partner. Sex therapy can be conducted with any adult client, including older adults, any gender expression, and LGBTQ-identified people.

A therapist's misunderstanding of these conflicts can lead to resistance or serve as a barrier to improving sexual dysfunctions that are directly or indirectly related to sex. The interest in sex therapy among couples has increased along with the number of sexuality educators, counselors, and therapists. Today, sexual problems are no longer regarded as symptoms of hidden deviant, pathological, or psychological defects in maturity or development. Sex therapy has also influenced the emergence of sexual medicine and exploring integrative approaches to sex therapy, in addition to reducing or eliminating sexual problems and increasing sexual satisfaction for individuals of all stages of life. Health therapists, educators, and counselors are conducting research and administering surveys to fully understand normative sexual function – what most people do and experience as they grow older and live longer.

== Aging and sexuality ==
Both physical and emotional transformation throughout various stages of life can affect the body and sexuality. The subsequent decline in hormone levels and changes in neurological and circulatory functioning may lead to sexual problems such as erectile dysfunction or vaginal pain. These physical changes often affect the intensity of youthful sex and may give way to more subdued responses during middle and later life. Issues with low libido and sexual dysfunction are usually considered to be a byproduct of old age. The emotional byproducts of maturity, however — increased confidence, better communication skills, and lessened inhibitions — can help create a richer, more nuanced, and ultimately satisfying sexual experience. During AARP's last surveys in 1999, 2004, and 2009 statistics show well-being among older adults has increased; however, overall sexual satisfaction has decreased. Nevertheless, older adults believed that an active sexual life offers great pleasure and contributes materially to overall emotional and physical health.

=== Older adults ===
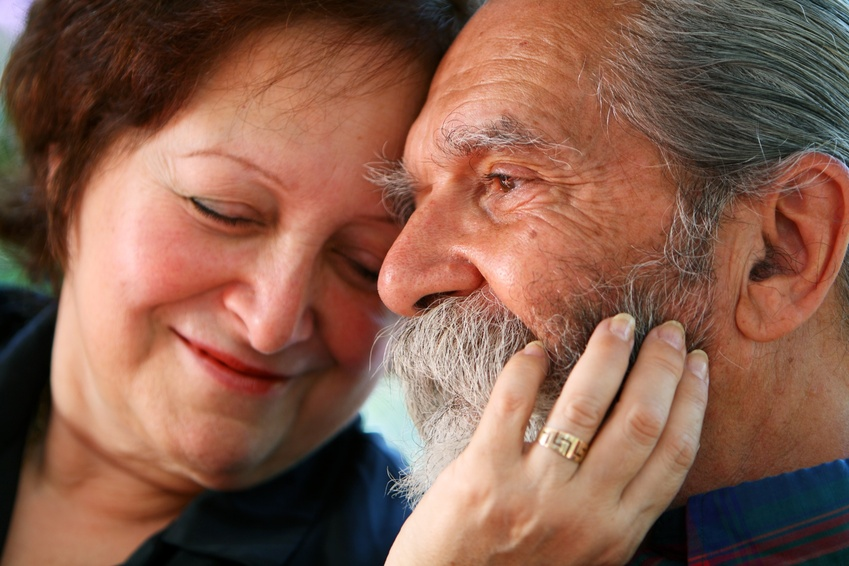
Sex therapy, at any age, often involves sensate-focused touching.

Over the years, little attention has been paid to older adults and sexuality. As the population of older adults and life expectancy continue to grow, there is information about sex therapy but it is often not easily accepted. Cultural and sexual roles are always changing throughout the life-course. As people age, they are often viewed as asexual or as incapable of possessing sexual desires. The presence of sexual dysfunction during old age can be impacted by health problems. There are many endocrine, vascular and neurological disorders that may interfere in sexual function, along with some medications and surgeries. Older men experience changes that occur in sexual physiology and affect both erectile function and ejaculation. While older women experience physiological effects of aging after menopause, resulting in the decreased production of estrogen. This leads to increased vaginal dryness, general atrophy of vaginal tissue, and genital changes (reduced size of clitoral, vulvar, and labial tissue). Cognitive changes and decline is another factor that influences sexual activity. Dementia, Alzheimer's and mental health disorders may have an effect on sexual behavior, producing disinhibition or relationship difficulties with subsequent effects on couple's sexual relationships.

Sex therapy with older adults looks at factors which influence sexuality in older adults, including sexual desire, sexual activity, the value of sexuality, and health. It can include sensate focus, communication, and fantasy exercises as well as psychodynamic therapy.

Sex therapy for older adults is similar to sex therapy with other populations. It includes the use of water-based personal lubricants (for decreased vaginal lubrication), hormone therapy, and medications. Sex therapists working with older adults should know about sexuality and aging. They should also be aware of how stereotypes affect their clients. This is especially true for LGBT-identified clients.

Older adults may also need more education about their sexuality and sexual functioning. Curriculum for this includes communication, masturbation, body image, and spirituality. It also teaches about talking to a doctor about sexual activity. It is optimal that sex education for older adults includes information about sexually transmitted infections (STDs/STIs), such as HIV/AIDS.

== History ==
Sex therapy has existed in different cultures throughout time, including ancient India, China, Greece, and Rome. It has taken the form of manuals, spells, anaphrodisiacs or aphrodisiacs, and tantric yoga, among others. Much of sex therapy and sexual dysfunction in Western cultures was limited to scientific discussion, especially throughout the 19th century and into the early 20th century.

Sexologists such as Henry Havelock Ellis and Alfred Kinsey began conducting research in the area of human sexuality during the first half of the 20th century. This work was groundbreaking and controversial in the scientific arena.

In the 1950s, sex therapy was concerned with "controlling sexual expression" and repressing what was then-considered deviant behaviors, such as homosexuality or having sex too often. Masters and Johnson are credited with revolutionizing sex therapy in the mid-century and included couple therapy and behavioral interventions that focused on being present in the moment such as sensate focus exercises. Dr. Helen Singer Kaplan modified some of Masters and Johnson's ideas to better suit her outpatient practice, including introducing medication. Both integrated cognitive behavioral therapy into their practice and Kaplan used psychodynamic therapy as well. The combination of hypnotic procedures with humanistic psychodrama (Hans-Werner Gessmann 1976) is an option. The work of Jack Annon in 1976 also saw the creation of the PLISSIT model that sought to create a structured system of levels for the therapist to follow.

The mid-1980s saw the medicalization of sex therapy, with a primary focus on male sexual dysfunction. The 1990s brought penile injections and medications such as Viagra as well as the marketing of antidepressants for their delayed ejaculation side-effects. Hormone therapy was introduced to assist both male and female sexual dysfunction. Dilators were used to treat women with vaginismus and surgical procedures to increase the size of the vaginal opening and treat vulvar pain were also introduced.

== See also ==
- Certified Sex Addiction Therapist
- Certified Sex Therapist
- Emotional isolation
- List of sex therapists
- Sensate focus
- Sexual assistance
- Society for Sex Therapy and Research
- Touch starvation
