= American Association of Sexuality Educators, Counselors and Therapists =

Association for sexuality educators, counselors and therapists

AASECT
- American Association of Sexuality Educators, Counselors, and Therapists
- Formation: 1967
- Headquarters: Chicago, Illinois
- Location: United States
- Founder: Patricia Schiller, JD, MA
- Current President: Shadeen Francis, LMFT, CST
- Website: www.aasect.org

The American Association of Sexuality Educators, Counselors and Therapists (AASECT) is a professional organization for sexuality educators, sexuality counselors and sex therapists.

== History and overview ==
AASECT (/ˈeɪsɛkt/ AY-sekt) was founded in 1967 by Patricia Schiller with the aim of promoting greater understanding of human sexuality, especially in relation to women. AASECT publishes the peer-reviewed journals American Journal of Sexuality Education and the Journal of Sex Education and Therapy. AASECT offers certification of sexual health practitioners in four categories: sexuality educator, sex counselor, sex therapist (CST) and supervisor (CST-S). They have also published a directory of sex therapists since 1976 and have initiated therapeutic options via phone and online.
