= Culture Reframed =

Anti-pornography organization

Culture Reframed is an American nonprofit organization formed in 2015 to address the negative effects of pornography on young people. It was born from Stop Porn Culture, an international, feminist, anti-pornography organization.

== History ==
In the late 1990s and early 2000s, concurrent with the rapid growth of the Internet and the increased accessibility to pornography that it provided, feminists in the U.S. began to organize to discuss the proliferation of pornography and of "violence associated with its production and consumption". Some of the discussion participants decided to build a national movement to address the harms of the pornography industry. Some developed an updated version of similar 1970s slide shows to be used as an educational tool and to inspire action against the pornification (or sexualization) of culture. These efforts led to the 2008 creation of Stop Porn Culture.

The nonprofit Culture Reframed was born in 2015 when Gail Dines – a founder of Stop Porn Culture – and other public health experts and concerned scientists organized to study the impact of porn on youth and to help parents and educators mitigate its damaging influences.

== Mission and work ==
The Culture Reframed mission is stated in a single sentence: "We work to stop the emotional, behavioral, and sexual harms of pornography to children and youth."

The group says that about one third of 12-year-old children have seen – often unexpectedly – explicit, hardcore porn. This, they say, undermines social, emotional, cognitive, and physical development. They say parents and caregivers can help children "build resilience and resistance to hypersexualized media and porn."

Free courses on its website include one for educators, one for parents of tweens, and one for parents of teens. The website offers fact sheets and reports, and its online academic library serves as a clearinghouse for hundreds of peer-reviewed articles.

== Stop Porn Culture ==
Stop Porn Culture was created in 2008 to challenge "an increasingly pornographic pop culture" and the exploitation, coercion, and violence of the porn industry itself. Much of this work was done online through lecture videos and social media work as well as through workshops and conferences for feminist slideshow training. It was an unpaid organization and recruited through a volunteer and internship program focused on marketing, digital writing, video editing, and social media projects.

In 2013, Stop Porn Culture started a petition against the journal Porn Studies, a first-of-its-kind, peer-reviewed publication focused on porn studies. Stop Porn Culture's co-founder Dines claimed that the journal had a pro-porn bias, a claim that the journal denied.

In 2014, Media Education Foundation produced a documentary titled "Pornland: How the Porn Industry Has Hijacked Our Sexuality". Promoted on the Stop Porn Culture website, it was based on a 2010 book by Dines and was described as "an ideal introduction to the core arguments of the feminist anti-pornography movement."

== See also ==
- Anti-pornography movement in the United States
- Anti-pornography movement in the United Kingdom
- Free Speech Coalition – a non-profit trade association of the sex industry in the United States
- National Center on Sexual Exploitation – previously Morality in Media
- Women Against Pornography – anti-porn group of the late 1970s and the 1980s that used slide shows
- XXXchurch.com – a website to help men with addictions to pornography and sex
