= Myron (novel) =

1974 novel by Gore Vidal

- Cover of the first edition
- Author: Gore Vidal
- Language: English
- Genre: Science fiction
- Publisher: Random House
- Publication date: 1974
- Publication place: United States
- Media type: Print (Hardcover and Paperback)
- Pages: 244 pp
- ISBN: 0-394-49477-6
- OCLC: 934591
- Dewey Decimal: 813/.5/4
- LC Class: PS3543.I26 M92
- Preceded by: Myra Breckinridge

Myron is a novel by American author Gore Vidal, published in 1974. It was written as a sequel to his 1968 bestseller Myra Breckinridge. The novel was published shortly after an anti-pornography ruling by the Supreme Court; Vidal responded by replacing the profanity in his novel with the names of the Justices involved (e.g., "He thrust his enormous Rehnquist deep within her Whizzer White", etc.)

== Plot summary ==
Myra Breckinridge, the transsexual who terrorized Hollywood with dildo-rape and lesbianism, has reverted back to her former self, the literally and metaphorically castrated Myron.

Myron watches Siren of Babylon, a 1948 fictional film starring Maria Montez on the late show and based upon Siren of Atlantis (released 1938), which starred that actress. He/she is transported to the set of the 1948 film through the television. It is a dream for Myra and Myron's nightmare. As Myron tries to adapt to life inside an endlessly repeating B-movie, Myra begins to creep back into Myron's head, making a connection with a gay member of the community to obtain dresses and wigs. Her lapses back into Myron's personality are encouraged by a character based on Norman Mailer (who, while drunk, shows attraction to Myra). Most of the others favor Myra over Myron. She attempts to castrate a crew member, then tries to castrate herself. She gains partial success in acquiring silicone implants. While Myron searches for a way off the set, he runs into Richard Nixon along the way, who is considering taking up residence in Siren of Babylon to escape the Watergate hearing. Myra wants to reside permanently.

Myra/Myron then trades places with Montez, the star of the film. Myra is ecstatic and Myron disappears from the narrative for a time. When Montez, inhabited by Myra, coincidentally meets the 1948 Myron (who in this year is a child, possessed by the soul of a perplexed Montez) their respective personalities are restored to their original bodies. Myron returns to his living room in 1970s California. The changes wrought by Myra's running amok on the set of Siren of Babylon continue to influence the present. The book ends with a former cowboy actor in the film, now a transsexual, being elected Republican governor of Arizona. (This likely references the political career of Ronald Reagan.)

== Glossary ==
In his introduction to the novel, Vidal mentions the Supreme Court decision Miller v. California, which in his words "leaves to each community the right to decide what is pornography." Saying that the decision has "alarmed and confused peddlers of smut" by eliminating guidelines, Vidal says he has decided to substitute the names of the five Justices who voted for the decision, plus the names of anti-pornography crusaders Charles Keating of Citizens for Decent Literature and Father Morton A. Hill, S.J. of Morality in Media (whom Vidal had debated on The David Susskind Show in 1968), for the "dirty words". He has done this to conform to the Supreme Court's imposition of the "community standards" test, as he wants "to conform with the letter and spirit of the Court's decision."

These are the words and their substitutions:

- blackmun: ass
- burger: fuck
- father hills: tits
- keating: shit
- powells: balls
- rehnquist: cock
- whizzer white: cunt

Later editions of the novel do not use these substitutions.

== Sources ==
- Vidal, Gore (1974). Myron: A Novel. New York: Random House. ISBN 0-394-49477-6.
