= Morton Hill =

Morton Hill may refer to:

== People ==
- Morton A. Hill (1917–1985), American clergyman and anti-pornography activist
- Morton Charles Hill (1936–2021), American diplomat

== Places ==
- Morton Hill (New York), a mountain in the Catskill Mountains in New York state
- Morton on the Hill, a civil parish in the English county of Norfolk

== See also ==
- Hillmorton, a suburb of Rugby, Warwickshire, England
- Hillmorton, New Zealand, a suburb of south-western Christchurch
