= NCOSE =

NCOSE can refer to:

- National Center on Sexual Exploitation
- International Council on Systems Engineering
