= List of Washington Journal programs aired in March 1995 =

The C-SPAN news and interview program Washington Journal has been presented live every day of the year from January 4, 1995 through the present, with very few exceptions. Programs are typically a mix of politically themed interviews, viewer calls and emails, discussion of current events, and reviews of that morning's newspapers.

In the table below, guests are listed in alphabetical order, rather than the order in which they appeared on the program. They are also listed with the position or affiliation they held at the time of their appearance.

== Table of programs ==
Date (w/link to video)	Approx. run time	Host(s)	Guests	Comments and summary
Wednesday, March 1, 1995	3 hr.	Bruce Collins; Steve Scully	Gov. George Allen (R-VA); Rep. Samuel "Sam" Brownback (R-KS); Tom Diemer (Washington Bureau Correspondent, Cleveland Plain Dealer); John D. Holum (Director, Arms Control and Disarmament Agency); Rep. Sheila Jackson Lee (D-TX); Merrill Matthews Jr. (Health Policy Director, National Center for Policy Analysis); Michael Petit (Deputy Director, Child Welfare League of America)	"Mr. Diemer talked about the status of the Balanced Budget Amendment in the Senate. In the newspaper roundtable, Reps. Brownback and Lee discussed headlines from various papers across the country. Via remote, Governor Allen talked about Virginia’s recently passed welfare reform plan. In a point-counterpoint discussion, Mr. Matthews and Mr. Petit discussed welfare reform. Mr. Holum talked about the Nuclear Non-proliferation Treaty (NPT)."
Thursday, March 2, 1995	3 hr.	Susan Swain	Victor Ashe (Mayor [R], Knoxville, TN); Susan B. Glasser (Managing Editor, CQ Today); Rep. Marcy Kaptur (D-OH); Carolyn Lochhead (Correspondent, San Francisco Chronicle); Steve McFarland (Attorney); Elliot Mincberg (Vice President and Gen. Counsel, People for the American Way); James "Jim" P. Pinkerton (Syndicated Columnist, Los Angeles Times); Sylvia Smith (Washington D.C. Editor, Fort Wayne Journal Gazette; Kathleen Sylvester (Domestic Policy Vice President), Progressive Policy Institute)	"Ms. Lochhead talked about the status of the Balanced Budget Amendment in the Senate. In the newspaper roundtable, Mr. Pinkerton and Ms. Sylvester discussed headlines from various papers across the country. Via telephone, Rep. Kaptur talked about the vote in the House on U.S aid to Mexico. Via remote link, Ms. Glasser talked about an editorial in Roll Call on Senator Robert Dole and the Balanced Budget Amendment. In a point-counter point discussion, Mr. McFarland and Mr. Mincberg discussed the relationship between church and state. Mayor Ashe talked about crime block grants to states. Via telephone, Ms. Smith talked about presidential ambitions of Senator Richard Lugar."
Friday, March 3, 1995	3 hr. 1 min.	Connie Doebele; Brian Lamb	Lee Bandy (Correspondent, The State, Columbia, SC); Martin Corry (Federal Affairs Director, American Association of Retired Persons); John "Jack" Aloysius Farrell (Correspondent, Boston Globe); Chuck Green (Editor, Denver Post); Cragg Hines (Washington Bureau Chief, Houston Chronicle); Charles "Chuck" Raasch (Correspondent, Gannett News Service); Ruth Shalit (Editor New York Times Magazine); Joe Theissen (Research Director, Concord Coalition); Jamie Wallace (Chamber of Commerce President, Selma, Alabama); Brent Walth (Correspondent, The Oregonian)	"Mr. Raasch talked about some of the interesting people and issues this week with the balanced budget amendment. Via telephone, Mr. Walth talked about the Republicans and the Balanced Budget Amendment. In the newspaper roundtable, Mr. Farrell and Mr. Hines discussed headlines from various papers across the country. Via telephone, Ms. Shalit talked about her article in New York Times Magazine about Senator Robert Dole. Via telephone, Mr. Bandy talked about the "Straw Poll". Via telephone, Mr. Green talked about Ben Nighthorse Campbell's change in party affiliation from Democratic to Republican. In a point-counterpoint discussion, Mr. Corry and Mr. Theissen discussed social security and the budget. Via telephone, Mr. Wallace talked about the 30th anniversary of the march on Selma."
Saturday, March 4, 1995	1 hr. 27 min.	Steve Scully	Tom Fitton (Representative, National Empowerment Television); Colin Greer (Correspondent, Parade Magazine); Joan Lowy (Congressional Correspondent, Scripps Howard News Service); Rep. Ileana Ros-Lehtinen (R-FL); Bennett Roth (Correspondent, Houston Chronicle); Rep. Steve Stockman (R-TX); Dan Walters (Correspondent, Sacramento Bee); Frank Wilkinson (Correspondent, Rolling Stone)	This is the first Washington Journal program to be aired on a Saturday. "Ms. Lowy talked about her perspectives of the week events. In a point-counterpoint discussion, Reps. Ros-Lehtinen and Stockman discussed English as the official national language. In the newspaper roundtable, Mr. Wilkinson and Mr. Fitton discussed headlines from various papers across the country. Via telephone, Mr. Roth talked about the South Carolina Republican straw poll. Via telephone, Mr. Greer talked about his article in Parade Magazine about Americans in need. Via telephone, Mr. Walters talked about Governor Pete Wilson. "
Sunday, March 5, 1995	1 hr. 59 min.	Steve Scully	Sen. Robert C. Byrd (D-WV); Marlin Fitzwater (Former White House Press Secretary); Candace Gingrich; Chuck Greener (Communications Director, Republican National Committee); Michael "Mike" D. McCurry (White House Press Secretary); Andrew Nagorski (Moscow Bureau Chief, Newsweek); Pierre Salinger (Chief Foreign Correspondent, ABC News); Karen Tumulty (Washington, D.C. Correspondent, Time Magazine)	"Interviews, video clips and vignettes illustrated the political issues and events of the previous week. Topics included presidential politics, the 1996 presidential election and Russian politics."
Monday, March 6, 1995	1 hr. 59 min.		Lincoln Caplan (Editor, Newsweek); Alan J. Dixon (Chair, Defense Base Closure and Realignment Commission); Jamie Dupree (Correspondent, Cox Communications); James Michael Oliver (Worker, Norfolk Naval Base); Paul Rodriguez (Editor, Insight Magazine)	"Mr. Dupree talked about the vote on the Balanced Budget Amendment last Thursday and previewed this week in Congress. In the newspaper roundtable, Mr. Caplan and Mr. Rodriguez discussed a variety of topics. In the final segment, former Senator Dixon discussed the current hearings of the Defense Base Closure and Realignment Commission, which he chairs."
Tuesday, March 7, 1995	2 hr. 31 min.	Susan Swain	David Beeder (Correspondent, Omaha World Herald); Thomas Edmonds (President, Edmonds and Associates Inc.); John Franzen (President, John Franzen Multimedia); Rep. Pat Roberts (R-KS)	"In the first segment, Mr. Beeder discussed Republican efforts to cut the food stamp program, which is the largest part of agricultural spending. In the newspaper roundtable, Mr. Edmonds and Mr. Franzen talked about current events, including Senator Hatfield's controversial vote against the Balanced Budget Amendment. In the last segment, Rep. Roberts talked about Republican efforts to cut the food stamp program."
Wednesday, March 8, 1995	3 hr. 2 min.	Steve Scully	Gov. Howard Dean, M.D. (D-VT); Thomas Ferraro (Correspondent, Bloomberg Business News); Rep. Bob Goodlatte (R-VA); Rep. Luis Gutiérrez (D-IL); Rep. J.D. Hayworth (R-AZ); Patrice Hill (Correspondent, Washington Times); Abner J. Mikva (Counsel, White House); Tom Walker (Correspondent, Fisher Broadcasting)	"Mr. Walker discussed Senator Mark Hatfield’s current standing in Oregon following his vote against the Balanced Budget Amendment. Ms. Hill reviewed the legal reform measures being proposed by the House Republicans. In the newspaper roundtable, Rep. Gutierrez and Hayworth discussed the headlines in the morning newspapers around the U.S. Mr. Ferraro discussed the Securities Litigation Reform Bill being debated in the House. Mr. Mikva presented the case against the Republican legal reform proposals; Rep. Goodlatte presented the case in favor of it. In the final segment, Governor Dean discussed issues involved with welfare reform."
Thursday, March 9, 1995	3 hr.	Lew Ketcham	Sen. Bill Bradley (D-NJ); Sen. Dan Coats (R-IN); Betty Friedan (Author); Andrew "Andy" Taylor (Correspondent, Congressional Quarterly); Byron York (Correspondent, American Spectator); Cathy Young (Vice President, Women's Freedom Network)	"In the first segment Mr. Taylor talked about Line Item Veto legislation in the Senate. Ms. Friedan and Ms. Young took part in the newspaper roundtable and discussed women’s issues. Mr. York wrote the American Spectator cover story on ethics charges against House Speaker Newt Gingrich filed by Reps. Bonior and Jones. The article is critical of Bonior and Jones. In the point-counterpoint section, Republican Senator Coats supported the Line-Item Veto legislation while Democratic Senator Bradley opposed it."
Friday, March 10, 1995	3 hr.	Brian Lamb	Janell Byrd (Attorney, NAACP Legal Defense and Education Fund); Jack Fishman (Regional Operations Director, National Newspaper Association); Kathy Kiely (Washington Bureau Chief, Houston Post); Sen. Joseph "Joe" Lieberman (D-CT); John Moore (Correspondent, National Journal); Michael Parta (Chairman, National Newspaper Association); William Welch (Congressional Correspondent, USA Today); Thomas Wood (Representative, California Civil Rights Initiative)	"Both the incoming and the outgoing chairman of the National Newspaper Association, who both represent small town newspapers discussed national stories and how they filter down to smaller areas. Ms. Kiely and Mr. Welch reviewed today’s newspaper headlines. Senator Lieberman, newly appointed chair of the Democratic Leadership Conference, talked about welfare reform. In the point-counterpoint segment Ms. Byrd and Mr. Wood debated the California Civil Rights Initiative. Mr. Moore discussed his new article on young conservatives in Washington."
Saturday, March 11, 1995	1 hr. 26 min.	Lew Ketcham	Donald Haines (Legislative Affairs Counsel, American Civil Liberties Union); Jesse Jackson Jr. (Director, National Rainbow Coalition); David Lightman (Washington Bureau Chief, Hartford Courant); Michael Sununu (Research Director, National Republican Congressional Committee); Patrick A. Trueman (Government Affairs Director, American Family Association)	"In the first segment, Mr. Lightman reviewed the week in Washington, including the controversy over affirmative action. In the next segment, Mr. Haines and Mr. Trueman discussed free speech and pornography issues on the information superhighway. In the newspaper roundtable, Mr. Jackson and Mr. Sununu reviewed current topics including affirmative action and deficit reduction."
Sunday, March 12, 1995	1 hr. 59 min.	Bruce Collins	Ronald Brownstein (Correspondent, Los Angeles Times); Jeff Danziger (Editorial Cartoonist, Christian Science Monitor); Nina J. Easton (Correspondent, Los Angeles Times); Michael Isikoff (Correspondent, Newsweek); Richard "Rich" A. Lowry (Correspondent, National Review); Daniel J. Mitchell (Senior Fellow, Political Economy, The Heritage Foundation); Nancy Mitchell (Vice President, Citizens for a Sound Economy)	"In the opening segment, Mr. Lowry reviewed the legislative agenda for the upcoming week in Congress. In the newspaper roundtable, two married couples, the Mitchells and Mr. Brownstein and his wife Ms. Easton, discussed the top new stories and current events. In the final segment, Mr. Danziger discussed his cartoons and his views on current events and issues."
Monday, March 13, 1995	2 hr. 37 min.	Brian Lamb	Sam Durrance (Space Shuttle Astronaut, NASA); John Harwood (White House Correspondent, Wall Street Journal); Glenda Hood (President, National League of Cities); Tammy Jernigan (Space Shuttle Astronaut, NASA); Wesley Pruden (Editor-in-Chief, Washington Times); Suneea Ratan (Correspondent, Time Magazine); Robert Stachnik, (Hubble Space Telescope Specialist, NASA); Ray Suarez (Talk Show Host, National Public Radio)	"Mr. Harwood talked about his article in the Wall Street Journal about limits on product-liability and medical suits and other headlines in various newspapers across the country. Dr. Stachnik talked about the NASA space program and the space shuttle Endeavour. Via satellite link, space shuttle astronauts Jernigan and Durrance talked about their mission on board the space shuttle. In the newspaper roundtable, Mr. Suarez and Mr. Pruden discussed headlines from various papers across the country. Via remote line, Ms. Hood discussed the National League of Cities meeting scheduled for today in Washington, DC. Via remote link, Mr. Ratan talked about his article in Time Magazine about social security."
Tuesday, March 14, 1995	3 hr. 2 min.	Lew Ketcham; Susan Swain	Former Rep. Thomas "Tom" S. Foley (D-WA); George Hager (Correspondent, Congressional Quarterly); Brooks Jackson (Correspondent, CNN); Jane Kirtley (Executive Director, Reporters Committee for Freedom of the Press); Rep. John Mica (R-FL); Sen. Fred Thompson (R-TN); Jacob Weisberg (Correspondent, New York Magazine)	"Mr. Hager talked about the House Republican rescissions package. In the newspaper roundtable, Mr. Jackson discussed headlines from various papers across the country. Via remote link, Ms. Kirtley talked about the Reporters Committee for Freedom of the Press's report on the Clinton administration’s relationship with the media. In a point-counterpoint discussion, Rep. Foley and Senator Thompson discussed term limits. Mr. Mica discussed pension reform. Via telephone, Mr. Weisberg discussed his article in the New York Magazine about the Republican ideas about welfare reform and how President Clinton has responded to these ideas."
Wednesday, March 15, 1995	2 hr. 46 min.	Steve Scully	Albert Eisele (Editor, The Hill); Dan Freedman (Law Correspondent, Hearst Newspapers); Robert B. Reich (Secretary, Department of Labor); Robert V. Remini (History Professor, University of Richmond); Nancy Roman (Supreme Court Correspondent, Washington Times); Martin Scorsese (Filmmaker); Rep. Bobby Scott (D-VA); Rep. Peter Torkildsen (R-MA)	"Mr. Eisele discussed his interview with Rep. Richard Gephardt on the Democratic agenda for the next 500 days. Mr. Freedman discussed the ethics investigation of Housing and Urban Development Secretary Henry Cisneros. In the newspaper roundtable, Reps. Torkildsen and Scott discussed headlines from various papers across the country. Via telephone, Ms. Roman talked about term limits. Via telephone, Mr. Remini talked about former president Andrew Jackson. Mr. Reich discussed proposed cuts in summer jobs programs. Mr. Scorsese talked about a proposed artists' rights bill."
Thursday, March 16, 1995	2 hr. 47 min.	Lew Ketcham; Susan Swain	Kenneth Adelman (Columnist, Tribune Company); Mary Ann Akers (Correspondent, CongressDaily); David Baumann (Correspondent, CongressDaily); Rep. David "Dave" Lee Camp (R-MI); Rep. Ben Cardin (D-MA); Kati Marton (Fellow, Gannett Center for Media Studies); William Lee Miller (Professor of Political and Social Thought, University of Virginia); William Reed) (Communications Director, National Newspaper Association); Tom Wicker (Former Columnist, New York Times)	"Mr. Baumann and Ms. Akers discussed the current congressional debates on both the Senate striker replacement and House funding rescissions bills. In the newspaper roundtable, Mr. Wicker and Mr. Adelman discussed headlines from various papers across the country. Via remote link, Mr. Reed discussed the 168th anniversary commemoration for the first black-owned newspaper Freedom's Journal. In a point-counterpoint discussion, Reps. Camp and Cardin discussed the Republican proposed tax cut plan. Via telephone, Mr. Miller talked about former president James Madison. Ms. Marton talked about the Committee to Protect Journalists annual status report on the safety of journalists and freedom of the press around the world."
Friday, March 17, 1995	3 hr. 1 min.	Brian Lamb	John Alderdice (Alliance Party of Northern Ireland Leader, House of Commons of the United Kingdom); James H. Bruns (Director, National Postal Museum); Craig Crawford (Washington Bureau Chief, Orlando Sentinel); John Hume (Member for Foyle, House of Commons of the United Kingdom); Rep. Nancy Johnson (R-CT); Sen. Arlen Specter (R-PA); Rep. Louis Stokes (D-OH); Wilbert Tatum (Publisher and Editor, New York Amsterdam News); Ben J. Wattenberg (Senior Fellow, American Enterprise Institute)	"Mr. Crawford discussed the past week of House debate on rescissions and the Republican tax cuts. Via remote link, Mr. Bruns spoke about the 25th anniversary of the U.S. postal strike and discussed the museum’s many displays. In the newspaper roundtable, Mr. Wattenberg and Mr. Tatum discussed headlines from various papers across the country. Via remote link, Rep. Johnson discussed the Republican plan for tax cuts. Via remote link, Rep. Stokes discussed the Democratic position on the Republican tax cutting plan. In a point-counterpoint discussion, Mr. Alderdice and Mr. Hume discussed current events in Northern Ireland. Senator Specter discussed the future of the Central Intelligence Agency, his health, and his presidential aspirations."
Saturday, March 18, 1995	1 hr. 29 min.	Lew Ketcham	Bob Cohn (White House Correspondent, Newsweek); Peter LaBarbera (Editor, Lambda Report on Homosexuality); Heather Lamm (Member, Bipartisan Commission on Entitlements); Allan J. Lichtman (History Professor, American University); Melinda Paras (Executive Director, National Gay and Lesbian Task Force); Kevin Pritchett (Office of Sen. Trent Lott, R-MS)	"Mr. Lichtman talked about former president Grover Cleveland. In a point-counterpoint discussion, Ms. Paras and Mr. LaBarbera discussed homosexual marriages. In the newspaper roundtable, Ms. Lamm and Mr. Pritchett discussed headlines from various papers across the country. Via telephone, Mr. Cohn talked about his article in Newsweek about affirmative action."
Sunday, March 19, 1995	1 hr. 58 min.	Steve Scully	Jeffrey H. Birnbaum (Correspondent, Time Magazine); Former Gov. Mario M. Cuomo (D-NY); John H. Fund (Editorial Writer, Wall Street Journal); Donald Lambro (Political Affairs Correspondent, Washington Times); Gene B. Sperling (Deputy Assistant, White House); Former Gov. L. Douglas Wilder (D-VA)	"Mr. Birnbaum talked about his article in TIME about the Republican "Contract with America". In the newspaper roundtable, former Governor Wilder and Mr. Lambro discussed headlines from various papers across the country. Via telephone, Mr. Lund talked about his article in MediaCritic about talk radio. Via telephone, former Governor Cuomo discussed headlines from various papers across the country. Mr. Sperling discussed the Clinton administration's economic policies, and Republican legislation to change funding levels for child nutrition and welfare programs."
Monday, March 20, 1995	3 hr.	Connie Doebele	Betsy Hart (Columnist, Scripps Howard News Service); Donald F. Kettl (Senior Fellow, Government Studies, Brookings Institution); Nackey Loeb (Publisher, Manchester Union Leader); Askia Muhammad (Correspondent, National Scene News Bureau); Lloyd Ogilvie (Chaplain, U.S. Senate); Richard Sammon (Correspondent, CQ Daily); Rep. Robert "Bob" S. Walker (R-PA)	"Mr. Sammon reviewed the first 75 days of congressional debate on legislation outlined in the Republican Contract with America. In the point-counterpoint segment, Rep. Walker and Mr. Kettl debated progress on and meaning of the Republican Contract with America. Rep. Walker participated via remote connection. Mr. Kettl is the author of Fine Print: The Contract with America. Ms. Loeb discussed the Pat Buchanan presidential candidacy to be announced today. In the first of two parts, Rev. Ogilvie discussed his background and his appointment as Chaplain of the U.S. Senate."
Tuesday, March 21, 1995	2 hr. 29 min.	Lew Ketcham	Rep. Mac Collins (R-GA); Vanessa Gallman (National Correspondent, Knight-Ridder Newspapers); Heidi Hartmann (Director, Institute for Women's Policy Research); Jim Kuhnhenn (Washington Bureau Chief, Kansas City Star); Rep. Patsy Mink (D-HI); Bud Norman (Correspondent, Wichita Eagle); Rep. James Nussle (R-IA); Lloyd Ogilvie (Chaplain, U.S. Senate)	"Ms. Gallman discussed the welfare reform debate in Congress. She was present at the Knight-Ridder luncheon with Senator Kassebaum yesterday. Rep. Nussle and Ms. Hartmann discussed headline stories in the newspaper roundtable segment. In the point-counterpoint segment, Reps. Collins and Mink debated welfare reform. Kansas journalists Norman and Kynhenn discussed today's confirmation hearing on former Rep. Dan Glickman to be Secretary of Agriculture. Mr. Norman participated by telephone."
Wednesday, March 22, 1995	3 hr.	Bruce Collins; Steve Scully	Jim Abrams (Correspondent, Associated Press); Bonnie Campbell (Attorney General of Iowa); Lt. Gov. Gray Davis (D-CA); Patrick Ellis (President, Catholic University of America); Rep. William "Bill" F. Goodling (R-PA); Dave McConnell (Congressional Correspondent, WTOP-Radio); Dan Stein (Executive Director, Federation of Americans for Immigration Reform); Rick Swartz (Attorney, National Immigration Forum)	"In the first segment, Mr. Abrams talked about current Line-Item Veto legislation. In the newspaper roundtable, Rep. Goodling, chair of the House Economic and Education Opportunities Committee, and Rev. Ellis discussed morning headline stories from around the U.S. Mr. McConnell talked about welfare reform legislation. In the point-counterpoint segment, Mr. Stein supported and Mr. Swartz opposed the Republican welfare reform bill being debated in the U.S. House. In the final segment, Ms. Campbell talked about her appointment by President Clinton as director of the newly-created office of Violence Against Women."
Thursday, March 23, 1995	2 hr. 59 min.		Rep. Randall "Duke" Cunningham (R-CA); Rep. Nathan Deal (D-GA); Rep. Harris W. Fawell (R-IL); Robert Fersh (President, Food Research and Action Center); Sen. Jon Kyl (R-AZ); Rep. Donald M. Payne (D-NJ); Sen. Harry Reid (D-NV); Elizabeth Shogren (Correspondent, Los Angeles Times); Gov. Fife Symington (R-AZ)	"In the first segment, Ms. Shogren discussed the debate in the House on welfare reform and the various amendments which were voted on. In the newspaper roundtable, Senators Kyl and Reid discussed the top stories in the morning newspapers. Rep. Deal discussed his proposed bill for welfare reform and its differences from the Republican proposals. Rep. Payne discussed the status of the Congressional Black Caucus following its loss of federal funding. In the second roundtable, Rep. Cunningham and Mr. Fersh debated the merits of the Republican welfare reform proposals, especially those affecting the school lunch program. Governor Symington discussed the Republican welfare reform proposals and their impact on the states. In the final segment, Rep. Fawell talked about the status of the Affirmative Action programs."
Friday, March 24, 1995	3 hr.	Brian Lamb	David Brock (Investigative Reporting Correspondent, American Spectator); Rep. Eva Clayton (D-NC); Kenneth Cooper (Correspondent, Washington Post); David Corn (Washington Bureau Editor, The Nation); Elizabeth Kolbert (Correspondent, New York Times Magazine); Rep. Matt Salmon (R-AZ); Bill Williams (Writer, National Gallery of Art); Lisa Woll (Washington, D.C. Liaison, Save the Children)	"In the first segment, Mr. Cooper reviewed the major political issues during the past week. Mr. Williams discussed the life and career of Andrew Mellon, who served as the U.S. Secretary of the Treasury from 1921 to 1932 and founded the National Gallery of Art. In the newspaper roundtable, Mr. Brock and Mr. Corn reviewed the top stories in the morning paper. Ms. Kolbert discussed her article on Frank Luntz in the New York Times Magazine. Rep. Clayton and Salmon discussed welfare reform issues and reviewed the proposed reforms in the 104th Congress. In the final segment, Ms. Woll discussed her organization’s efforts to help children around the world, including the sale of scarves and ties."
Saturday, March 25, 1995	1 hr. 28 min.	Lew Ketcham; Steve Scully	Rene Denfeld; Kim Gandy; (Vice President, National Organization for Women); Jeff Glasser (Editor-in-Chief, Yale Daily News); Alex Schmitz (Editor, Georgetown Hoya); Steven Thomma (Politics Correspondent, Knight-Ridder Newspapers)	"Mr. Thomma reviewed the week for the Republican Congress and President Clinton. In the point-counterpoint segment, Ms. Denfeld, author of The New Victorians, and Ms. Gandy debated the proper goals for the feminist movement. In the newspaper roundtable, Mr. Glasser and Mr. Schmitz, who are both college newspaper editors reviewed current events, including education loan cuts and welfare reform."
Sunday, March 26, 1995	1 hr. 58 min.		Daniel "Dan" J. Balz (Politics Correspondent, Washington Post); Howard Fineman (Correspondent, Newsweek); Anne Groder (Correspondent, Orlando Sentinel); Alan Keyes (Talk Show Host, WCBM Radio); Gov. Michael O. Leavitt (R-UT); Gov. Ben Nelson (D-NE)	"In the first segment, Mr. Fineman described the contentious political debate over affirmative action and discussed other political issues. In the newspaper roundtable, Governors Leavitt and Nelson reviewed current news stories and outlined their perspectives on welfare reform. Mr. Keyes, a former U.S. Ambassador to the United Nations, talked about his reasons for running for president. Ms. Groder talked about the Gridiron Club dinner held last night in Washington. Mr. Balz talked about presidential politics, especially the Republican race."
Monday, March 27, 1995	2 hr. 59 min.	Brian Lamb	Elliott Abrams (Former Assistant Secretary for Inter-American Affairs, U.S. Department of State); Haley Barbour (Chairman, Republican National Committee); Jean Casimir (Haitian Ambassador to the United States); Arnaud De Borchgrave (Editor-in-Chief, Washington Times); James Fallows (Washington D.C. Editor, Atlantic Monthly); William Jones (Former United States Ambassador to Haiti); T. Boone Pickens Jr. (Former Chairman and CEO, Mesa Limited Partnership); Kathy Sawyer (Correspondent, Washington Post); Benjamin Sheffner (Correspondent, CQ Today); Gov. Pete Wilson (R-CA)	"Mr. Sheffner discussed the upcoming debate on term limits. In the newspaper roundtable, Mr. De Borchgrave and Mr. Fallows discussed headlines from various papers across the country. Via telephone, Ms. Sawyer talked about her Washington Post article about NASA budget cuts. In a point-counterpoint discussion, Mr. Abrams and Mr. Jones discussed U.S. policy toward Haiti. Ambassador Casimir talked about the U.S. policy toward Haiti. Mr. Pickens discussed U.S. oil policy."
Tuesday, March 28, 1995	3 hr. 1 min.	Lew Ketcham; Susan Swain	Jennifer Babson (Correspondent, Congressional Quarterly); Rep. Barney Frank (D-MA); Rep. Van Hilleary (R-TN); Sen. Kay Bailey Hutchison (R-TX); Rep. Robert "Bob" Inglis (R-SC); Paul Jacob (Executive Director, U.S. Term Limits); Victor Kamber (Political Consultant, Democratic Party); Rep. Bill McCollum Jr. (R-FL); Rep. Douglas "Pete" B. Peterson (D-FL); Sen. Paul Wellstone (D-MN)	"All of the guests discussed term limits."
Wednesday, March 29, 1995	3 hr. 5 min.	Bruce Collins; Steve Scully	Rep. Corrine Brown (D-FL); Former Gov. Edmund "Jerry" G. Brown Jr. (D-CA); Warren Christopher (U.S. Secretary of State); Rep. Peter "Pete" King (R-NY); Terry Lemons (Correspondent, Arkansas Democrat-Gazette); Rep. Martin "Marty" Meehan (D-MA); William Pascoe (Legislative Affairs Director, American Conservative Union); Rep. Nick Smith (R-MI); Stuart S. Taylor Jr. (Senior Writer, The American Lawyer)	"Mr. Lemons discussed yesterday and today’s debate on term limits in the House. He also discussed the Arkansas term limits law that went to the Supreme Court. In the newspaper roundtable, Rep. Smith and former Governor Brown discussed headlines from various papers across the country. Reps. Meehan and Keene talked about how they strongly support term limits. Reps. Brown and King talked how they strongly oppose term limits. Via remote link, Mr. Pascoe talked about term limits. Mr. Taylor discussed the Supreme Court’s handling of term limits legislation passed by states and previewed the debate over the constitutionality of term limits legislation that could be passed by Congress. Mr. Christopher discussed several issues, including President Clinton’s upcoming trip to Russia."
Thursday, March 30, 1995	3 hr. 1 min.	Lew Ketcham; Susan Swain	Kenan Block (Television Committee Chairman, U.S. House of Representatives); Sen. Thad Cochran (R-MS); Jeanne Cummings (Correspondent, Cox Newspapers); Rep. James Vear Hansen (R-UT); Rep. Peter Hoekstra (R-MI); Rep. Steny H. Hoyer (D-MD); Anick Jesdanun (Pennsylvania Correspondent, Associated Press); Ralph Lotkin (Former Chief Counsel, House Standards of Official Conduct Committee); Sen. David Pryor (D-AR); Ralph E. Reed Jr. (Executive Director, Christian Coalition of America); Ann Stone (Chairwoman, Republicans for Choice)	"Rep. Hoekstra, Rep. Hoyer and, via telephone, Mr. Block discussed the new television coverage of the House. In the newspaper roundtable, Senators Cochran and Pryor discussed headlines from various papers across the country. In a point-counterpoint discussion, Mr. Reed and Ms. Stone discussed the issue of abortion and how it relates to Republican politics. Mr. Jesdanun discussed Senator Specter and his prospects in the 1996 presidential race. Mr. Lotkin, Ms. Cummings and, via telephone, Rep. Hansen discussed the history of the House Ethics Committee, what their mission was and is, some of the members of the committee and previous investigations."
Friday, March 31, 1995	3 hr. 3 min.		R.W. "Johnny" Apple Jr. (Washington Bureau Chief Correspondent, New York Times); Michael Beard (President, Coalition to Stop Gun Violence); Shirley Chater (Commissioner, Social Security Administration); John Cochran (Chief Congressional Correspondent, ABC News); Robert DeFao (Horticulturalist, National Park Service); Paul Gigot (Columnist, Wall Street Journal); Dan Glickman (Secretary, Department of Agriculture); Lisa Leiter (Correspondent, Insight Magazine); Dianne Mance (President, National Cherry Blossom Festival); Tanya Metaksa (Executive Director, National Rifle Association Institute for Legislative Action); David Rieff (Contributing Editor, New Republic)	"Mr. Cochran talked about headlines from various papers across the country. Via remote link, Ms. Mance talked about the details of the Cherry Blossom Festival and the history of the cherry blossom trees. In the newspaper roundtable, Mr. Apple and Mr. Gigot discussed headlines from various papers across the country. Via remote link, Mr. Glickman discussed his plans for the Agriculture Department. In a point-counterpoint discussion, Mr. Beard and Ms. Metaksa discussed revising gun laws. Via remote link, Mr. DeFao talked about the cherry blossom trees in the nation’s capitol. Mr. Rieff, who is the author of Slaughterhouse, talked about the situation in Bosnia. Ms. Chater talked about the changes in the Social Security Agency. Via telephone, Ms. Leiter talked about the freshman conservative women in the House."
