= Anti-pornography movement in the United States =

An anti-pornography movement in the United States has existed since before the 1969 Supreme Court decision of Stanley v. Georgia, which held that people could view whatever they wished in the privacy of their own homes, by establishing an implied "right to privacy" in U.S. law. This led President Lyndon B. Johnson, with the backing of Congress, to appoint a commission to study pornography. The anti-pornography movement seeks to maintain or restore restrictions and to increase or create restrictions on the production, sale or distribution of pornography.

== Presidential Commission on Obscenity and Pornography ==
In 1970, the President's Commission on Obscenity and Pornography concluded that "there was insufficient evidence that exposure to explicit sexual materials played a significant role in the causation of delinquent or criminal behavior." In general, with regard to adults, the Commission recommended that legislation "should not seek to interfere with the right of adults who wish to do so to read, obtain, or view explicit sexual materials." Regarding the view that these materials should be restricted for adults in order to protect young people from exposure to them, the Commission found that it is "inappropriate to adjust the level of adult communication to that considered suitable for children." The Supreme Court supported this view.

A large portion of the Commission's budget was applied to funding original research on the effects of sexually explicit materials. One experiment is described in which repeated exposure of male college students to pornography "caused decreased interest in it, less response to it and no lasting effect," although it appears that the satiation effect does wear off eventually ("Once more"). William B. Lockhart, Dean of the University of Minnesota Law School and chairman of the commission, said that before his work with the commission he had favored control of obscenity for both children and adults, but had changed his mind as a result of scientific studies done by commission researchers. In reference to dissenting commission members Keating and Rev. Morton A. Hill, Lockhart said, "When these men have been forgotten, the research developed by the commission will provide a factual basis for informed, intelligent policymaking by the legislators of tomorrow".

Commission member Father Hill, the founder of Morality in Media, helped to author a minority report that disagreed with the findings of the Commission. Believing that the Commission was stacked towards First Amendment free speech advocates, Father Hill and another clergyman on the Commission, Dr. Winfrey C. Link, issued the Hill-Link Minority Report rebutting the conclusions of the majority report. Issued in 1970, the majority report was rejected by both President Richard Nixon and the United States Congress. The Hill-Link Report, which recommended maintaining anti-obscenity statutes, was read into the record of both the Senate and the House of Representatives. It was cited by the Burger Court in its 1973 obscenity decisions, including Miller v. California.

== Meese Commission under Reagan ==
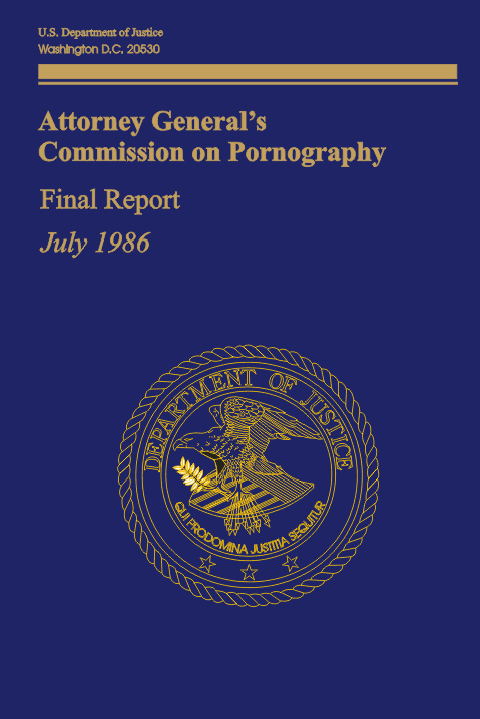
Meese report cover

President Ronald Reagan announced his intention to set up a commission to study pornography. The result was the appointment by Attorney General Edwin Meese in the spring of 1985 of a panel of 11 members, the majority of whom had established records as anti-pornography crusaders.

In 1986, the Attorney General's Commission on Pornography, often called the Meese Commission, reached the opposite conclusion, advising that pornography was in varying degrees harmful. A workshop headed by Surgeon General C. Everett Koop provided essentially the only original research done by the Meese Commission. Given very little time and money to "develop something of substance" to include in the Meese Commission's report, it was decided to conduct a closed, weekend workshop of "recognized authorities" in the field. All but one of the invited participants attended. At the end of the workshop, the participants expressed consensus in five areas:

1. "Children and adolescents who participate in the production of pornography experience adverse, enduring effects,"
2. "Prolonged use of pornography increases beliefs that less common sexual practices are more common,"
3. "Pornography that portrays sexual aggression as pleasurable for the victim increases the acceptance of the use of coercion in sexual relations,"
4. "Acceptance of coercive sexuality appears to be related to sexual aggression,"
5. "In laboratory studies measuring short-term effects, exposure to violent pornography increases punitive behavior toward women"

According to Surgeon General Koop, "Although the evidence may be slim, we nevertheless know enough to conclude that pornography does present a clear and present danger to American public health".

== New Right opposition ==
In the 1980s, a grassroots effort began to mount opposition to pornography. New Right conservatives considered pornography indecent, and detrimental to the traditional family.

== Pandering and prostitution statutes ==
In 1983, prosecutors in California tried to use pandering and prostitution state statutes against a producer of and actors in a pornographic movie; the California Supreme Court ruled in 1988 that these statutes do not apply to the production of non-obscene pornography. It has been suggested that this decision was one of the contributing factors that led to the popularity of California with adult filmmakers.

== Obscenity vs. free speech ==
In a line of cases beginning with Roth v. United States, 354 U.S. 476 (1957), the United States Supreme Court has repeatedly held that distribution of obscenity is not protected by the First Amendment or by any other provisions of the U.S. Constitution. The court in Stanley v. Georgia, 394 U.S. 557 (1969) however, later clarified that possession of obscenity is protected on the grounds of both the First and Fourteenth Amendments.

== Miller v. California ==
In explaining its position, in Miller v. California, 413 U.S. 15 (1973) the U.S. Supreme Court found that:

The dissenting Justices sound the alarm of repression. But, in our view, to equate the free and robust exchange of ideas and political debate with commercial exploitation of obscene material demeans the grand conception of the First Amendment and its high purposes in the historic struggle for freedom. It is a "misuse of the great guarantees of free speech and free press . . . ." Breard v. Alexandria, 341 U.S., at 645.

and in Paris Adult Theatre I v. Slaton, 413 U.S. 49 (1973) that:

In particular, we hold that there are legitimate state interests at stake in stemming the tide of commercialized obscenity, even assuming it is feasible to enforce effective safeguards against exposure to juveniles and to passersby. 7 [413 U.S. 49, 58] Rights and interests "other than those of the advocates are involved." Breard v. Alexandria, 341 U.S. 622, 642 (1951). These include the interest of the public in the quality of life and the total community environment, the tone of commerce in the great city centers, and, possibly, the public safety itself... As Mr. Chief Justice Warren stated, there is a "right of the Nation and of the States to maintain a decent society ...," [413 U.S. 49, 60] Jacobellis v. Ohio, 378 U.S. 184, 199 (1964) (dissenting opinion)... The sum of experience, including that of the past two decades, affords an ample basis for legislatures to conclude that a sensitive, key relationship of human existence, central to family life, community welfare, and the development of human personality, can be debased and distorted by crass commercial exploitation of sex.

The Supreme Court defined obscenity in Miller v. California with the Miller test.

== Protect Act and U.S. v. Williams ==
The Supreme Court on May 19, 2008 upheld a 2003 federal law, the Prosecutorial Remedies and other Tools to end the Exploitation of Children Today Act, the Protect Act, aimed at child pornography, in a 7-to-2 ruling penned by Justice Antonin Scalia in United States v. Williams. It dismissed the United States Court of Appeals for the 11th Circuit's finding the law unconstitutionally vague. Michael Williams of Florida was caught in a 2004 federal undercover operation and found guilty later of "pandering" child pornography, since he offered to sell nude pictures of his young daughter and other forms of child pornography in an Internet chat room.

== Criticism ==
The so-called "Sex Wars" of the late 1970s challenged the traditional understanding of the gender role. Andrea Dworkin and Catharine MacKinnon became well-known often-cited anti-pornography authors. Many debates have attended their political intervention into the law by way of their advocacy of anti-pornography ordinances in several midwestern cities. Other notable American anti-pornography activists to belong to this camp are Robin Morgan and Susan Griffin. Libertarians, who separate sex and violence, take MacKinnon and Dworkin to task for their refusal to leave sexual expression alone. This was done particularly by Gillian Rodgerson and Elizabeth Wilson in Pornography and Feminism: The Case Against Censorship: "Yet this theoretical cocktail of biologism and behaviorism is lethal. To see men as naturally programmed for violence is to endorse the most conservative views on human nature, and to see it as unchanging and unchangeable". Rodgerson and Wilson argue that pornography plays a relatively minor role in the wider regime of sexist practices pervading women's lives.

Another matter, which frequently circulates in American anti-pornography movement is a close bond of pornography with rape. According to a 2006 paper, Porn Up, Rape Down, by Northwestern University Law Professor Anthony D'Amato, "the incidence of rape in the United States has declined 85 per cent in the past 25 years while access to pornography has become freely available to teenagers and adults". Recognizing that the Nixon and Reagan Commissions tried to show that exposure to pornographic materials produced social violence, D'amato concludes that "the reverse may be true: that pornography has reduced social violence". D'amato suggests there are two predominant reasons why an increase in the availability of pornography has led to a reduction in rape. First, using pornographic material provides an easy avenue for the sexually desirous to "get it out of their system". Second, D'amato points to the so-called "Victorian effect". It dates back to the British Victorian era when people covered up their bodies with an immense amount of clothing, generating a greater mystery as to what they looked like naked. D'amato suggests that the free availability of pornography since the 1970s, and the recent bombardment of internet pornography, has de-mystified sex, thus satisfying the sexually curious.

== See also ==
- Anti-pornography movement in the United Kingdom
- Free Speech Coalition
- Nymwar
- Scunthorpe problem
- Sex-positive movement – the opposing viewpoint
- Stop Porn Culture
- XXXchurch.com
