= XXXchurch.com =

Non-profit Christian website

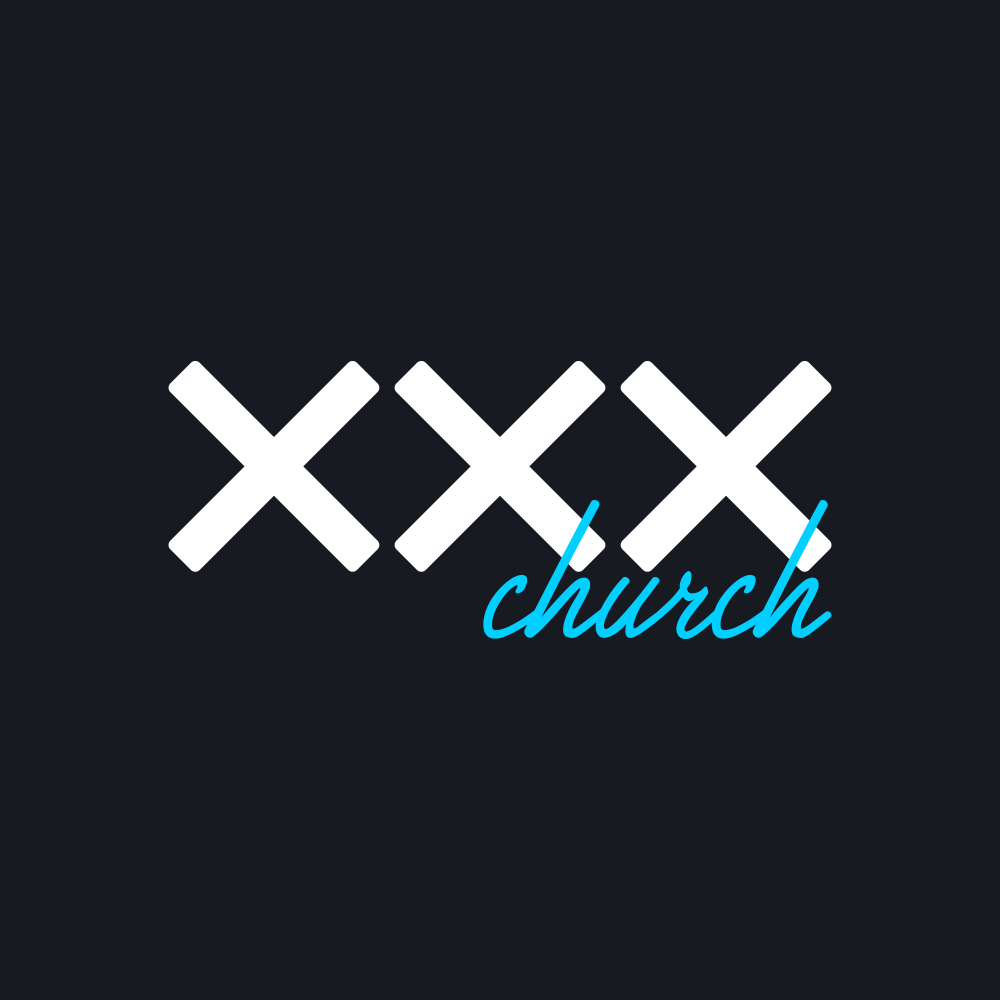
- Founded: June 5, 2001; 25 years ago
- Founder: Mike Foster (2001–2004); Craig Gross (2001–2020)
- Type: Religious charity
- Headquarters: Deptford Township, New Jersey, U.S.
- Location: Deptford Township, New Jersey, U.S.
- CEO: Carl Thomas
- Key people: Carl Thomas (2021–); Michelle Russell (2004–)
- Website: xxxchurch.com

XXXchurch.com is a website developed by Live Free Ministries promoting a Christian ideology to try to help men with pornography and sex addiction. The website was launched in 2002 and relaunched/rebranded in 2021 when it became part of Live Free Ministries, a New Jersey–based 501(c)(3) non-profit.

The website provides articles, videos, podcasts, courses, and online communities.

== History ==
The website was launched in January 2002 when Fireproof Ministry founders, set up a booth inside the AVN Adult Entertainment Expo in Las Vegas to promote the website and continued to attend porn conventions internationally for over 15 years. The group has given out Bibles with "Jesus Loves Porn Stars" on the cover at these conventions, a facet of their ministry which has been featured in American national media.

The organization has received support from Christian pastors such as Bill Hybels, Craig Groeschel and Rick Warren.

Non-Christian pornographic film director James DiGiorgio took photographs for XXXchurch and faced business issues as a result of becoming affiliated with the organization. He said, "[The sex industry is] always trying to preach freedom of speech; [so] anyone in this industry who has a problem with [XXXchurch's] message is a fucking hypocrite. You can't have it both ways."

In 2004, Mike Foster departed from Fireproof Ministries and XXXchurch.

In 2005, the independent film Missionary Positions was released, produced and directed by Bill Day, which documented the origins of XXXchurch.

Craig Gross left the ministry in 2021 to promote the benefits of marijuana consumption and other drugs.

In March 2021, XXXchurch was acquired and relaunched by Live Free Ministries.

Live Free Ministries founder and executive director, Carl Thomas, was once employed by the 501(c)(3) organization Fireproof Ministries and left to start his own non-profit in 2019.

== See also ==
- Anti-pornography movement in the United States
- Fight the New Drug
- Stop Porn Culture
- NoFap
