= Religious views on masturbation =

Among the world's religions, views on masturbation vary widely. Some religions view it as a spiritually detrimental practice, some see it as not spiritually detrimental and others take a situational view. Among these latter religions, some view masturbation as allowable if used as a means towards sexual self-control, or as part of healthy self-exploration, but disallow it if it is done with motives they consider to be wrong, or as an addiction. A 2016 Psychology Today article stated that the more religious people are, the more likely they are to restrict their sexual fantasies, have fewer sex partners, use less pornography and express stronger disapproval of the use of sex toys.

== Abrahamic religions ==
=== Biblical scholarship ===
Most scholars have held that there are no explicit proscriptions in the Bible about masturbation. The word masturbation is never specifically mentioned in the Bible, nor are there any clear unchallenged references to masturbation. Various passages have been held to implicitly condemn or approve of masturbation, but others disagree; there is not "a clear condemnation of masturbation".

The biblical story of Onan (Genesis 38) is traditionally linked to referring to masturbation and condemnation thereof. A number of scholars have pointed out that the sexual act described by this story is coitus interruptus, not masturbation. Some go further and argue that Onan's death was solely due to his refusal to fulfill the obligation of levirate marriage, rather than any sexual sin. Others argue that Onan's punishment was both for his refusal to fulfill his obligations and because of his perverse sexual act. For example, James Nelson argues that Onan's act was condemned due to the firm "procreative" accent of the Hebrew interpretation regarding sexuality, where survival of the tribe depends on abundant procreation. The story was written by a "prescientific mind" that considered the child to be contained in the sperm the same way a plant is contained in its seed. Onan's offense was therefore the deliberate destruction of human life.

Leviticus 15:16–17 says that a man who has an emission of semen should wash and be ceremonially unclean until evening. Verse 18 goes on to say that if a man and woman have intercourse, the same cleanliness rules apply. Ilona N. Rashkow states that Leviticus 15:16 "refers to the emission rather than its circumstances." According to James R. Johnson, by bringing up intercourse separately, the passage implies that the emission of semen in verses 16 and 17 occurred for the man individually. The passage may be referring to a nocturnal emission, or wet dream, rather than masturbation, but the passage is not specific. In contrast, Deuteronomy 23:9–11 explicitly specifies nocturnal emission. Johnson thus views this passage as suggesting that masturbation is a purely ceremonial cleanliness issue, and not as a matter of morality. Johnson also notes that the passage puts no more disapproval on the solitary experience than it does on intercourse.

Matthew 5:29–30, Matt. 18:6–9, and Mark 9:42–48 state that, if they cause one to sin, one should tear out one's eye and cut off one's hand or foot. Will Deming states "The sinning by eye, hand, and foot may come from a tradition of formulaic warnings against lustful gazing (by the eye), masturbation (by hand), and adultery (by 'foot', the Hebrew euphemism for genitalia)," referencing the Niddah, specifically m. Nid. 2.1 and b. Nid. 13b. In addition to the eye, Deming argues that "the hand plays a major role in lust as well through masturbation". William Loader links this to the story of Origen, where perhaps Origen read "foot" and "hand" as euphemisms for penis and castrated himself. Loader views attaching special meanings to the body parts in these passages as over-interpretation, as these passages are mainly hyperbole.

1 Thessalonians 4:3–4 reads: “What God wants is for you all to be holy. He wants you to keep away from fornication [porneia], and each of you to know how to use the body that belongs to him in a way that is holy and honorable, not giving way to selfish lust like the pagans who do not know God.” The Greek word porneia (πορνεία) is used in other New Testament passages such as Galatians 5:19–23 and has a general meaning of sexual immorality or unchastity. More generally, Paul refers to purity and contamination in 2 Corinthians 7:1. Some commentators view the word porneia as including masturbation, and see these passages as implicitly confirming the immorality of masturbation. Others disagree, holding that this passage simply condemns the pagans' then-common sexual licentiousness and promiscuity, and has no relevance to masturbation.

Romans 1:24 and 1 Corinthians 6:10 are sometimes held to refer to masturbation, but Dedek argues that they refer to sodomy and pederasty respectively.

1 Corinthians 7:3–5 has been held by some to allow masturbation in the context of marriage. The passage may imply that masturbation should not necessarily be a normal circumstance, but if for example sexual tension becomes unmanageable due to extended separation, Johnson states "masturbation would not counteract the divine purpose" with the consent of one's spouse.

=== Christianity ===
Christian denominations have different views on masturbation. Today, Roman Catholic (including Eastern Catholic), Eastern Orthodox, Oriental Orthodox and some Protestant Christians consider masturbation to be a sin. Many Protestant churches in Northern and Western Europe and some Protestant churches in Northern America and in Australia/New Zealand see masturbation as not a sin.

According to Björn Krondorfer, "Auto-erotic sex became conceivable as a distinct entity among sexual sins only when the autonomous self emerged." He goes on to cite Laqueur, "Only after the Freudian revolution...did a cultural shift occur. Masturbation was now valued as an adult, non-pathological, pleasurable activity. 'Beginning in the 1950s, picking up energy with the feminism of the 1960s and early 1970s, with the subsequent sex wars, and with the worldwide gay movement of the last quarter of the century, it would become an arena of sexual politics and for art across a wide spectrum of society...Due to this cultural change across the spectrum, even theological reassessments of masturbation as a positive sexual practice were possible – though, admittedly, rare."

=== Islam ===
In modern times, Islamic jurists have ruled masturbation (Arabic: استمناء, romanized: istimnā’) haram (forbidden) or makruh (discouraged) on the basis of Istihsan (discretion), however there is a widely cited hadith by Hasan al-Basri, Qatada ibn al-Nu'man and Al-Dahhak ibn Muzahim, that the Sahaba practiced it during the Ghazwat, which is used to form other opinions.

Another common narration is that of Ibn Abbas:

Ibn Abbas said: "Masturbation is better than fornication, and marrying a concubine is better than masturbation."

— al-Tabari, Ikhtilaf al-Fuqaha, p. 303

As well as that of Jabir ibn Zayd:

Jabir ibn Ziyad said: "It is your liquid, you may do with it as you please."

— Abd al-Razzaq al-San'ani, Musannaf Abdurrazzaq, vol. 7, p.391

The minority viewpoint then formed with these narration as their basis, most notably Ahmad ibn Hanbal, and his student Ibn Qayyim al-Jawziyya, as well as Ibn Hazm, who permit masturbation as an alternative to zina (fornication), or if one is unable to buy a concubine or pursue marriage. It used to be the majority opinion within the Zahiri and Hanbali schools of thought.

Bathing (ghusl) after any kind of seminal discharge whether through sexual intercourse, masturbation, or nocturnal emissions is considered obligatory according to all Islamic schools of jurisprudence, in order to be considered ritually pure for compulsory prayer.

=== Judaism ===
Maimonides stated that the Tanakh does not explicitly prohibit masturbation. On the matter of masturbation, the biblical story of Onan is traditionally interpreted by Jews to be about the emitting sperm outside of the vagina and condemnation thereof, applying this story to masturbation, although the Tanakh does not explicitly state that Onan was masturbating. By virtue of Onan, traditional Judaism condemns [male] masturbation.

Leviticus 15:16–18 states that any male who emits semen is considered ritually impure - whether the emission came through masturbation, nocturnal emission, or sex between married heterosexual partners. The traditional rabbinical interpretation of Leviticus 15 was that it applies to all sperm flows, including sperm flows due to masturbation. Other than this ritual impurity, no consequences or punishments are specified.

Even among Jewish scholars and among rabbis, it is widely disputed whether the prohibition of masturbation is a biblical prohibition or a rabbinical prohibition, since it is never explicitly mentioned in the Torah. Many Ultra-Orthodox rabbis are afraid to publicly discuss their disagreement with the traditional interpretation about it being prohibited by the Bible.

== Indian and Iranian religions ==
=== Hinduism ===
Seeking bodily pleasure is only considered condemned for those who dedicate themselves to chastity. There are no references in Hindu religious texts to suggest that masturbation itself desecrates sexual purity. For those who are dedicated to chastity, this sin is absolutely minor, and can be absolved either by taking a bath, or by worshipping the Sun, or by saying three prayers.

=== Buddhism ===
The most used formulation of Buddhist ethics are the Five Precepts. These precepts take the form of voluntary personal undertakings, not divine mandate or instruction. The third precept is "to refrain from committing sexual misconduct". However, different schools of Buddhism have differing interpretations of what constitutes sexual misconduct.

Buddhism was advanced by Gautama Buddha as a method by which human beings could end dukkha (suffering) and escape samsara (cyclic existence). Normally this entails practicing meditation and following the Four Noble Truths and the Noble Eightfold Path as a way to subdue the passions which, along with the skandhas, cause suffering and rebirth. Masturbation (Pali: sukkavissaṭṭhi) is accordingly seen as problematic for a person who wishes to attain liberation. According to a lecture by Lama Thubten Zopa Rinpoche, it is important to abstain from "sexual intercourse, including masturbation, any action that brings an orgasm and so forth, because this results in a rebirth." He clarifies: "Generally, the action that is the opposite of the precept brings the opposite negative result, takes us further from enlightenment, and keeps us longer in samsara."

Shravasti Dhammika, a Theravadin monk, cites the Vinaya Pitaka in his online "Guide to Buddhism A to Z", and states the following:

Masturbation (sukkavissaṭṭhi) is the act of stimulating one's own sexual organs (sambādha) to the stage of orgasm (adhikavega). In the Kāma Sūtra male masturbation is called "seizing the lion" (siṃhākāranta). Some people during the Buddha's time believed that masturbation could have a therapeutic effect on the mind and the body (Vin. III, 109), although the Buddha disagreed with this. According to the Vinaya, it is an offence of some seriousness for monks or nuns to masturbate (Vin. III, 111) although the Buddha gave no guidance on this matter to lay people. However, Buddhism could agree with contemporary medical opinion that masturbation is a normal expression of the sexual drive and is physically and psychologically harmless, as long as it does not become a preoccupation or a substitute for ordinary sexual relations. Guilt and self-disgust about masturbating is certainly more harmful than masturbation itself.

His opinions regarding non-Buddhists notwithstanding, the Buddha did encourage his serious disciples to limit their sexual behaviour or to embrace celibacy. Indeed, emphasis on chastity in Buddhism is strong for bhikkhus and bhikkhunis (renunciates), who vow to follow the rules of the Vinaya. Not only are monastics celibate, but they also take more and stricter vows in order to conquer their desires. In the Theravadin tradition, masturbation is also stressed as being harmful for upāsakas and upāsikās (lay devotees) who practice the Eight Precepts on Uposatha days, leading a more ascetic lifestyle that does not allow for masturbation. Indeed, public masturbation is explicitly characterised as sexual misconduct in the mahāyāna Upāsakaśīla sūtra:

"If one has sex with oneself or someone by the road, beside a pagoda or temple, or in an assembly, one is guilty of the sin of sexual misconduct."

Nevertheless, some contemporary writers on Buddhism suggest that masturbation is essentially harmless for a layperson.

However, many Buddhist practitioners disagree on whether masturbation constitutes sexual misconduct or not, where Gampopa (1079-1153) believed that anal or oral sexes with any genders as improper sexual behavior, and Longchenpa (1308–1363) included masturbation along with it as sexual misconduct. Je Tsongkhapa (1357–1419) however, accepts masturbation. On the other hand, Dalai Lama Tenzin Gyatso reportedly believes that masturbation does constitute sexual misconduct.

=== Zoroastrianism ===
The act of masturbation is known as Shoeythra Gunaah, or Shoithra-gunah, which can also be used to refer to onanism.

The Zoroastrian holy book Avesta, with its stress on physical cleanliness, lists voluntary masturbation among the unpardonable sins that one can commit. This view was supported by James R. Russell. The Verses 26-28 of Fargard VIII, Section V of the Vendidad state

O Maker of the material world, thou Holy One! If a man involuntarily emits his seed, what is the penalty that he shall pay?

Ahura Mazda answered: 'Eight hundred stripes with the Aspahê-astra, eight hundred stripes with the Sraoshô-karana.'

O Maker of the material world, thou Holy One! If a man voluntarily emits his seed, what is the penalty for it? What is the atonement for it? What is the cleansing from it?

Ahura Mazda answered: 'For that deed there is nothing that can pay, nothing that can atone, nothing that can cleanse from it; it is a trespass for which there is no atonement, for ever and ever.'

When is it so?

'It is so, if the sinner be a professor of the law of Mazda, or one who has been taught in it. But if he be not a professor of the law of Mazda, nor one who has been taught in it, then this law of Mazda takes his sin from him, if he confesses it and resolves never to commit again such forbidden deeds.

The scholar Sorabji Edalji Dubash has also written:

If a man resorts to the evil practice of masturbation to overcome his passion, his tissues, both muscular and nervous, become relaxed in tone. By the waste of muscular tissue he is hardly able to undergo the exertion required for the discharge of his daily duties. But it is the nervous tissue that suffers most, inasmuch as his memory fails, his intellect becomes dull, he becomes morose and peevish, and shuns the agreeable society of his friends and relatives, and consequently he becomes subject to melancholia. His mind soon becomes exhausted after slight application and its power of retaining impressions is lost. If he becomes subject to melancholia, he sometimes attempts to commit suicide. When we consider these evil effects following masturbation, we do not wonder why it is considered an inexpiable crime.

Masturbation is also considered a Drujih-i-Buji (evil associated with menstrual flow) which is caused by the menstrual discharge of a woman if proper precautions are not followed. Drujih (evil) is smarter and stronger than human intelligence. Thus also enumerated in the Expiatory prayer of Dasturan Dastur Adarbad Mahrespand fall under Drujih-i-Buji. A right knowledge of Drujih-i-Buji and of the ill-effects is said to save young boys of the age of puberty from the fangs of masturbation.

In the story of Jamshid and Taxmoruw (Tahmuras) preserved in a Parsi rivayat, Ahriman is shown to be a masturbator.

Zoroastrian hell is also said to have sinners forced to defecate and masturbate continually.

== East Asian religions ==
=== Taoism ===
Some teachers and practitioners of Traditional Chinese medicine, Taoist meditative and martial arts say that masturbation can cause a lowered energy level in men. They say that ejaculation in this way reduces "origin qi" from dantian, the energy center located in the lower abdomen. Some maintain that sex with a partner does not do this because the partners replenish each other's qi. Some practitioners therefore say that males should not practice martial arts for at least 48 hours after masturbation while others prescribe up to six months, because the loss of Origin Qi does not allow new qi to be created for this kind of time.

Some Taoists strongly discouraged female masturbation. Women were encouraged to practice massaging techniques upon themselves, but were also instructed to avoid thinking sexual thoughts if experiencing a feeling of pleasure. Otherwise, the woman's "labia will open wide and the sexual secretions will flow." If this happened, the woman would lose part of her life force, and this could bring illness and shortened life.

=== Confucianism ===
Since the Song dynasty, the framing of sexual asceticism as a moral imperative began to spread among intellectual elites due to the emergence of neo-Confucianism. The elite masculinity of junzi (the cultured man) emphasised intellectuals’ capability to assist the emperor to govern the country. Strict self-cultivation (xiushen) through obedience to the patriarchal family institution was then seen as a necessary means for budding intellectuals to transform themselves into eligible political elites. Excessive or deviant sexual desire, viewed as men's overindulgence in private affairs and disobedience to their masculine family/public obligations, was thus disparaged by dynastic rulers. This norm was also imposed on the emperors themselves. Masturbation raises an ethical crisis because it means that men waste their bodily essence for pleasure, harm their spirit and productivity, and thus disobey their obligation to carry on the family lineage and fail to practice filial piety.

== Wicca ==
Wicca, like other religions, has adherents with a spectrum of views ranging from conservative to liberal. Wicca is generally undogmatic, and nothing in Wiccan philosophy prohibits masturbation. On the contrary, Wiccan ethics, summed up in the Wiccan Rede "An it harm none, do as thou wilt", are interpreted by many as endorsing responsible sexual activity of all varieties. This is reinforced in the Charge of the Goddess, a key piece of Wiccan literature, in which the Goddess says, "all acts of love and pleasure are my rituals".

== See also ==
- Chastity
- Fornication
- Religion and sexuality
- Religious views on pornography

== Bibliography ==
- Wile, Douglas (1992). Art of the Bedchamber: The Chinese Sexual Yoga Classics Including Women's Solo Meditation Texts. G – Reference, Information and Interdisciplinary Subjects Series. State University of New York Press. ISBN 978-0-7914-0885-8.
- Numbers, Ronald L. (2003). Sex, Science, and Salvation: The Sexual Advice of Ellen G. White and John Harvey Kellogg. Johns Hopkins University Press.
- Kwee, Alex W.; Hoover, David C. (2008). "Theologically-Informed Education about Masturbation: A Male Sexual Health Perspective" (PDF). Journal of Psychology and Theology. 36 (4): 258–269. doi:10.1177/009164710803600402. ISSN 0091-6471. S2CID 142040707. Archived (PDF) from the original on 6 February 2012. "The Bible presents no clear theological ethic on masturbation, leaving many young unmarried Christians with confusion and guilt around their sexuality."
- Harvey, John F. "The Pastoral Problem of Masturbation" (PDF). couragerc.org. Archived from the original (PDF) on 2014-12-22.
- Dobson, James (2012) [1978]. Preparing for Adolescence: How to Survive the Coming Years of Change (Ebook ed.). Grand Rapids, Michigan: Revell. p. 50. ISBN 978-1-4412-2483-5. Archived from the original on 2021-08-15. "Still, the subject of masturbation is a very controversial one. Christian people have different opinions about how God views this act. Unfortunately, I can't speak directly for God on this subject, since His Holy Word, the Bible, is silent on this point. I will tell you what I believe although I certainly do not want to contradict what your parents or your pastor believe. It is my opinion that masturbation is not much of an issue with God. It's a normal part of adolescence, which involves no one else. It does not cause diseases, it does not produce babies, and Jesus did not mention it in the Bible. I'm not telling you to masturbate, and I hope you won't feel the need for it. But if you do, it is my opinion that you should not struggle with guilt over it."
- Dobson, James C. (2000). Preparing for Adolescence: Growth Guide. Delight, AR: Gospel Light. ISBN 978-0-8307-2502-1. Archived from the original on 2021-08-15. "The Bible says nothing about masturbation, so we don't really know what God thinks about it. My opinion is that He doesn't make a big issue of it. It won't cause you to become crazy, as some people say. So I would encourage you not to struggle with guilt..."
