= Patrick A. Trueman =

American attorney

Patrick A. Trueman is an American attorney and anti-pornography activist who served as president of the National Center on Sexual Exploitation (NCOSE) from 2010 to 2023, though he continued to serve on the board for the NCOSE afterwords. He previously worked as the director of government affairs for the American Family Association, as a legal counsel for the Family Research Council and as the executive director of the Americans United for Life. Trueman was the Chief of the Child Exploitation and Obscenity Section, Criminal Division at the US Department of Justice from 1988 to 1993. During his tenure, the George H. W. Bush administration aggressively prosecuted obscenity cases against adult pornography. The ABA Journal dubs him a "porn war veteran". He took over at NCOSE in 2010 when it was a struggling organization known as Morality in Media, and during his tenure the organization started initiatives such as the "Dirty Dozen List" and the NCOSE Law Center.

== Personal life ==
Trueman is Catholic lives in North Carolina with his wife Laura Clay. They are the parents of three adult children.
