= Opposition to pornography =

Overview of opposing views to pornography

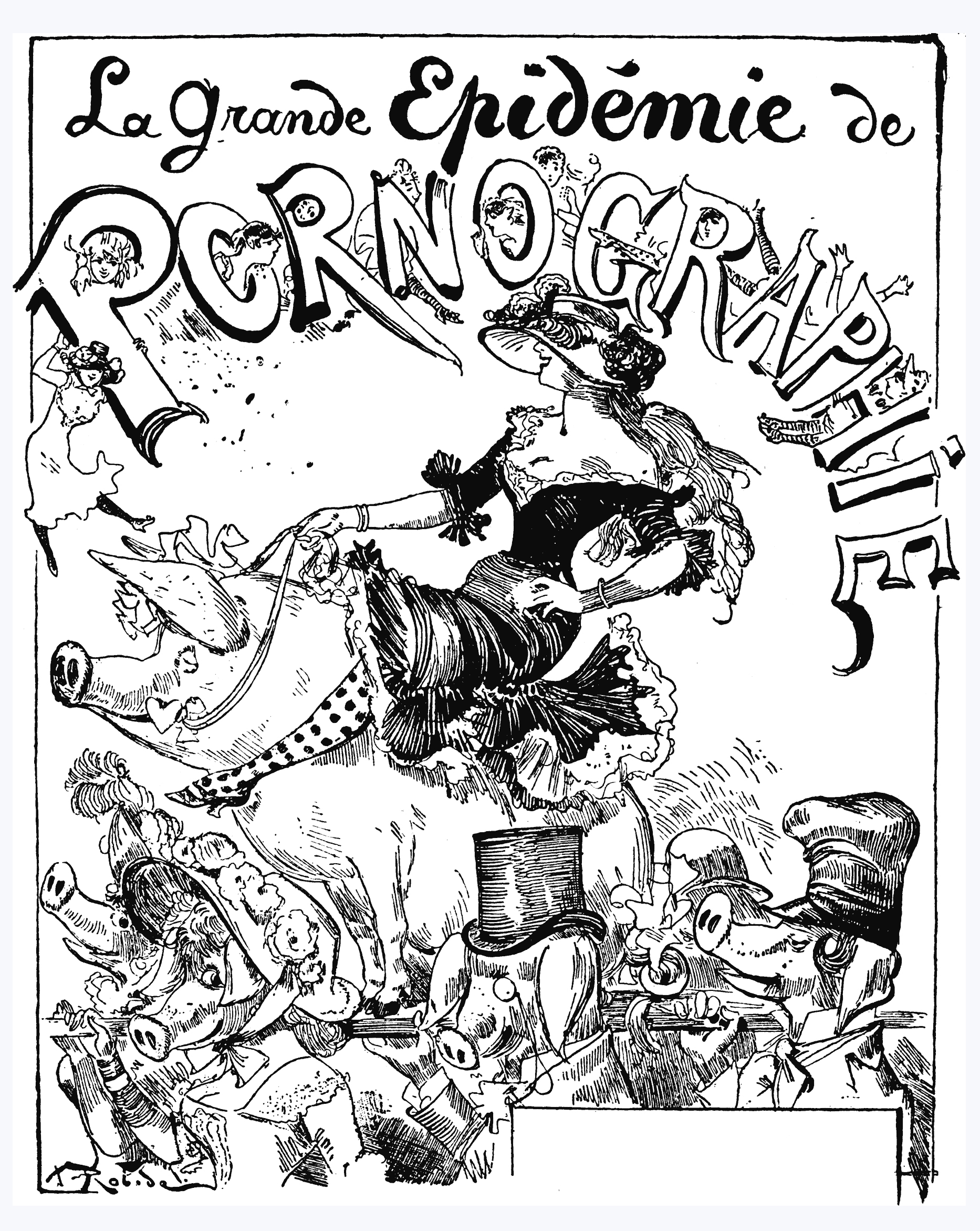
A caricature on "The great epidemic of pornography". French illustration (c. 1880 – c. 1900 CE).

Reasons for opposition to pornography include religious objections, moral values, feminist concerns, as well as harmful effects, such as pornography addiction and erectile dysfunction. Pornography addiction is not a condition recognized by the DSM-5, the ICD-11, or the DSM-5-TR. The definition of "porn" varies between countries and movements, and many make distinctions between pornography, which they oppose, and erotica, which they consider acceptable. Sometimes opposition will deem certain forms of pornography more or less harmful, while others draw no such distinctions.

A 2018 Gallup survey reported that 43% of U.S. adults believe that pornography is "morally acceptable", a 7% increase from 2017. By 2025 that number had fallen to 35%. From 1975 to 2012, the gender gap in pornography opposition has widened, with more women increasingly opposed to pornography, and men's opposition rate declining faster.

== Religious views ==
Most world religions hold negative opinions about pornography which stem from a variety of rationales, including concerns about human dignity, modesty, chastity, and other virtues.

In Judaism and Christianity, there are numerous verses in the Bible which are usually cited as condemning fornication and adultery, notably the Sermon on the Mount in Matthew 5:28, which states that "anyone who looks at a woman lustfully has already committed adultery with her in his heart." The Catechism of the Catholic Church explicitly condemns pornography because it "offends against chastity" and "does grave injury to the dignity of its participants", since "each one becomes an object of base pleasure and illicit profit for others".

Islam also forbids adultery and fornication, and various verses of the Quran have been cited as condemning pornography and lustfulness, including Surah An-Nur (24:30–31), which tells Muslim women to "lower their gaze and guard their chastity, and not to reveal their adornments, except what normally appears", and Muslim men to "lower their gaze and guard their chastity. That is purer for them. Surely, Allah is All-Aware of what they do."

== Feminist views ==
Some feminists are opposed to pornography, arguing that it is an industry which exploits women and is complicit in violence against women, both in its production (where they present evidence that abuse and exploitation of women performing in pornography is rampant) and in its consumption (where pornography eroticizes the domination, humiliation, and coercion of women, and reinforces sexual and cultural attitudes that are complicit in rape and sexual harassment). They charge that pornography contributes to the male-centered objectification of women and thus to sexism. Andrea Dworkin was a feminist famously opposed to the pornography industry, and proposed the Antipornography Civil Rights Ordinance in several American cities in the 1980s. In 2015, feminist Gail Dines founded Culture Reframed, which responds to the growing pornography industry by providing education and support for healthy child and youth development.

However, many other feminists are opposed to censorship, and have argued against the introduction of anti-porn legislation in the United States, among them Betty Friedan, Kate Millett, Karen DeCrow, Wendy Kaminer and Jamaica Kincaid. Some sex-positive feminists actively support pornography that depicts female sexuality in a positive way, without objectifying or demeaning women, whereas some other feminists don't see any problem with the industry in its current state, given the subjective nature of perceiving humiliation or aggressiveness in a consensual context as something demeaning or negative.

== Conservative views ==
Religious conservatives commonly oppose pornography, along with a subset of feminists, though their reasoning may differ. Many religious conservatives view pornography as a threat to children. Some conservative Catholics and Protestants oppose pornography because they believe that it encourages non-procreative sex, encourages abortion, and can be connected to the rise of sexually transmitted diseases.

Concerned Women For America (CWA) is a conservative organization that opposes same-sex marriage and abortion. When discussing violence against women, the CWA often uses pornography to illustrate their points. The CWA asserts that pornography is a major reason why men inflict harm on women. The CWA argues that pornography convinces men to disrespect their wives and neglect their marriages, thereby threatening the sanctity of traditional marriage. Unlike other issues CWA has tackled, they are less forcefully anti-feminist when it comes to the topic of pornography, as many of their points surrounding why pornography is distasteful parallels those of anti-pornography feminists.

Some extremist Christian and far-right groups have issued death threats towards porn managers and sex workers.

== Science-based views ==
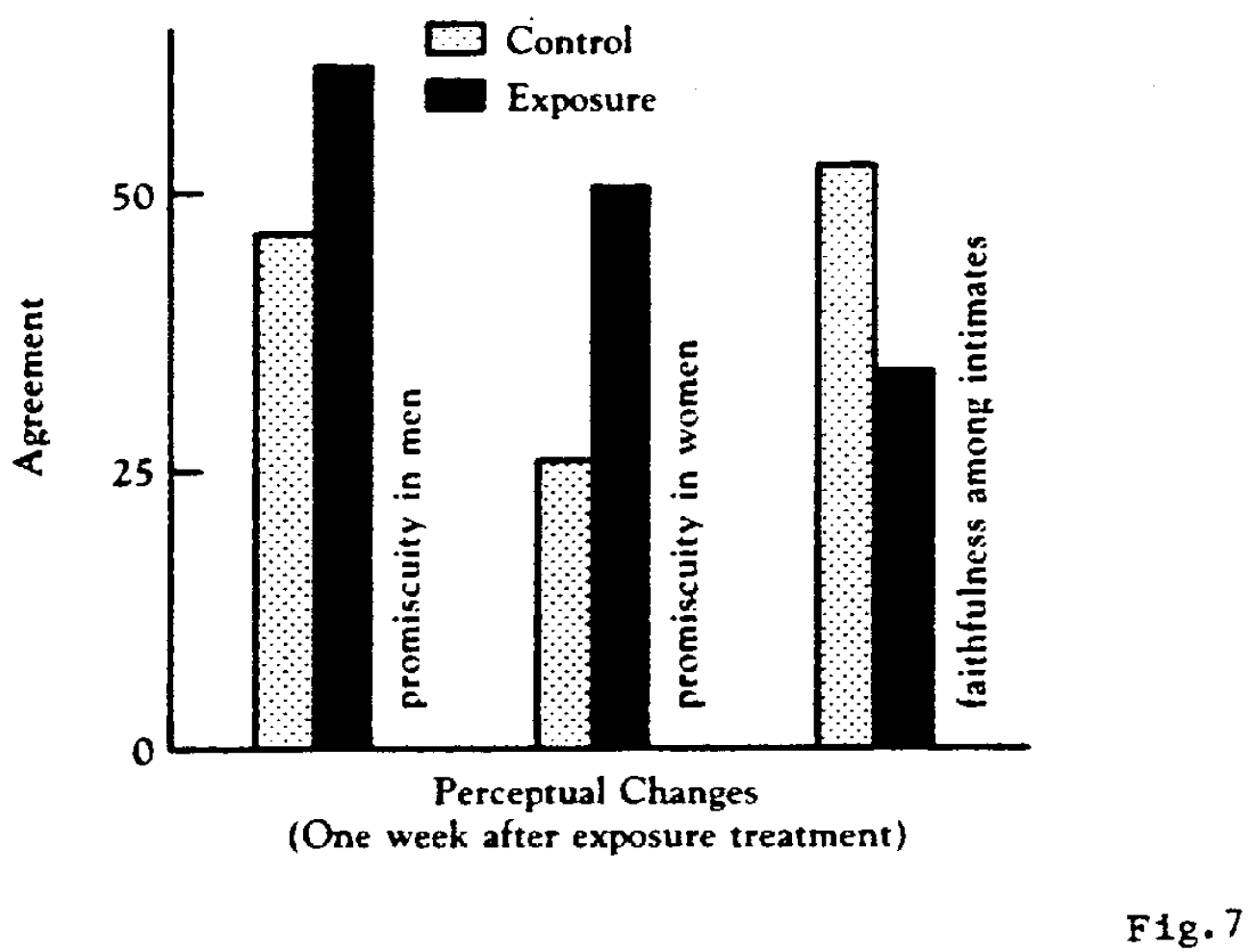
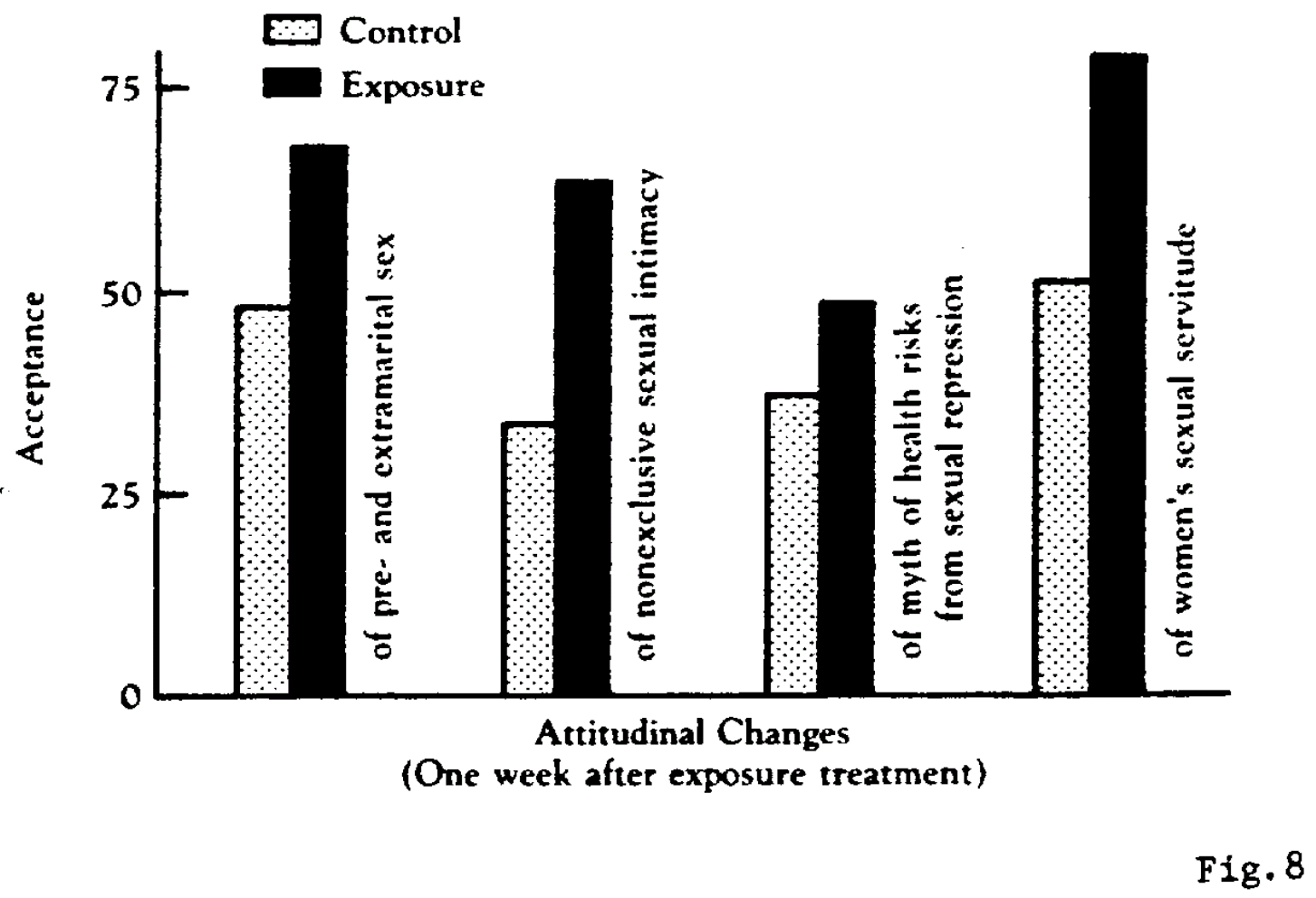
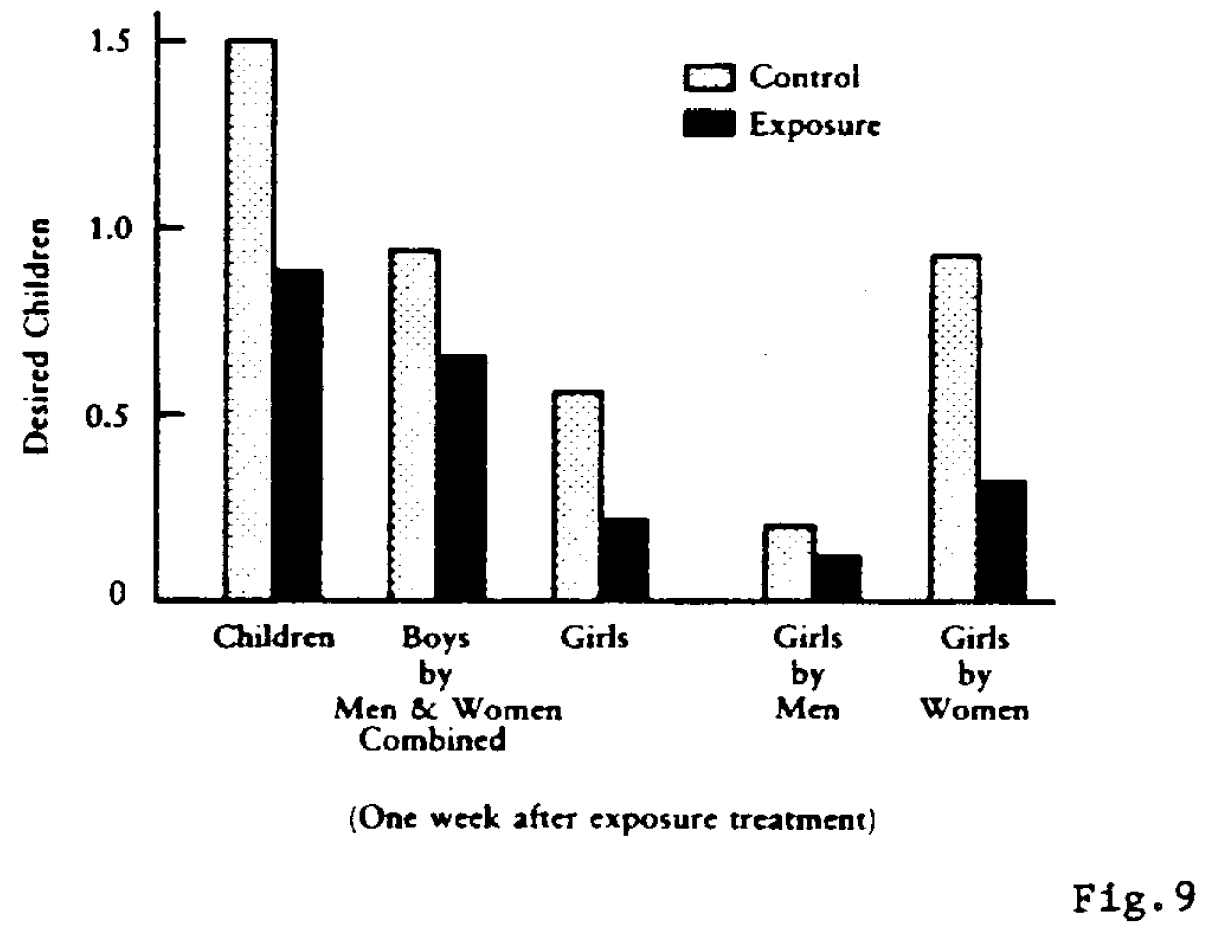
Figures 7, 8, and 9 in Zillmann, Dolf: "Effects of Prolonged Consumption of Pornography", 1986.

Dolf Zillmann argued in the 1986 publication "Effects of Prolonged Consumption of Pornography" that extensive viewing of pornographic material produces many unfavorable political effects, including a decreased respect for long-term monogamous relationships, and an attenuated desire for procreation. He describes the theoretical basis of these experimental findings:

The values expressed in pornography clash so obviously with the family concept, and they potentially undermine the traditional values that favor marriage, family, and children... Pornographic scripts dwell on sexual engagements of parties who have just met, who are in no way attached or committed to each other, and who will part shortly, never to meet again... Sexual gratification in pornography is not a function of emotional attachment, of kindness, of caring, and especially not of continuance of the relationship, as such continuance would translate into responsibilities, curtailments, and costs...

A study by Zillman in 1982 also indicated that prolonged exposure to pornography desensitized both men and women toward victims of sexual violence. After being shown pornographic movies, test subjects were asked to judge an appropriate punishment for a rapist. The test subjects recommended incarceration terms that were significantly more lenient than those recommended by control subjects who had not watched pornography. Some researchers like Zillman believe that pornography causes unequivocal harm to society by increasing rates of sexual assault. Other researchers believe that there is a correlation between pornography and a decrease of sex crimes; exhibiting a strong disbelief in the claim that pornography is a cause of rape; mainstream science does not claim that pornography would be a cause of rape.

The appropriation of the sexually explicit in American culture and society is part of what has been called "the pornification of America". Rape culture is often discussed when it comes to pornography, and is defined by society victim-blaming women because of their rape. It is known as society making rape less substantial. Some of the most searched titles on pornography websites is rape scenes.

The impact of pornography can vary significantly among teenagers and across cultures, depending on specific constellations of personality traits. Research indicates that special attention may be required for highly frequent consumers of pornography, those who actively seek sexually violent content, and individuals with additional risk factors. Male adolescents at a more advanced pubertal stage, characterized as sensation seekers with weak or troubled family relations, tended to use pornography more frequently. This usage correlated with more permissive sexual attitudes and stronger gender-stereotypical sexual beliefs. Additionally, it appeared to be associated with engaging in sexual intercourse, having greater experience with casual sex behavior, and an increased likelihood of involvement in sexual aggression, both as perpetrators and victims. The authors of the review state that the impact of pornography upon the brains of teenagers is a suggestion (what scientific literature suggests) rather than a scientific fact. That is, the data are suggestive rather than conclusive.

In a 2021 review of recent pornography research, K. Camille Hoagland & Joshua B. Grubbs posit that "Specifically, mere pornography use itself was most often not associated with sexual functioning in either direction, but self-reported problematic use of pornography was consistently associated with more sexual functioning problems."

Some studies suggest that children and youths are more susceptible to the neurological effects of pornography consumption than adults, however this lacks direct empirical evidence. This can be attributed to considerable ethical problems with performing such research. Since those problems are a huge obstacle, it is likely that such research will not be allowed, thus possibly it could never be known. Rory Reid (UCLA) declared "Universities don't want their name on the front page of a newspaper for an unethical study exposing minors to porn." Repeated cross-sectional surveys did not detect any correlation between pornography use and mental problems of teenagers, since the curve is U-shaped, with both too low and too high consumption of pornography being problematic.

While the World Health Organization's ICD-11 (2022) has recognized compulsive sexual behaviour disorder (CSBD) as an "impulsive control disorder", CSBD is not classified as an addiction; the American Psychiatric Association's DSM-5 (2013) and the DSM-5-TR (2022) do not classify compulsive pornography consumption as a mental disorder or a behavioral addiction. According to Emily F. Rothman, "The professional public health community is not behind the recent push to declare pornography a public health crisis." The ideas supporting the "crisis" have been described as pseudoscientific.

According to Samuel L. Perry, "it also seems likely that those who wish to ban pornography see science and scientists as apologists for sexual deviance".

== See also ==
- Anti-pornography movement in the United Kingdom
- Anti-pornography movement in the United States
- Criticism of Wikipedia § Sexual content
- Effects of pornography
- Nymwar
- Pornography addiction
- Pornography laws by region
- Religious views on pornography
- Stanley v. Georgia
- Scunthorpe problem
- Women Against Pornography
- Women Against Violence in Pornography and Media
