= Morton A. Hill =

American anti-pornography campaigner

Father Morton A. Hill, S.J. (1917-1985) was a leader of the campaign against pornography in the 1960s, 1970s and 1980s. He was one of the founders of Morality in Media, which was created in 1962 to fight pornography. President Lyndon B. Johnson appointed him to the President's Commission on Obscenity and Pornography.

Believing that the Commission was stacked with supporters of loosening laws on pornography, Hill and another clergyman on the Commission, Dr. Winfrey C. Link, issued the Hill-Link Minority Report rebutting the conclusions of the majority report, which held that pornography should be decriminalized as there were no links between it and criminal behavior.

Issued in 1970, the majority report was rejected by both President Richard Nixon and the United States Congress. The Hill-Link Report, which recommended maintaining anti-obscenity statutes, was read into the record of both the United States Senate and the United States House of Representatives. It was cited by the Burger Court in its 1973 obscenity decisions, including Miller v. California.

According to the Morality in Media site, Hill was influential in the Reagan Administration's efforts against pornography. In March 1983, he headed a coalition of groups spearheading the anti-pornography movement that met with President Reagan at the White House.

Hill and his allies recommended that the President appoint an anti-pornography czar to coordinate the federal government's efforts to crack down on porn. The Morality in Media site states, "As a result of this meeting, a White House Working Group on Pornography was formed in June of 1983, and in December, President Reagan addressed the nation's U.S. Attorneys and called for tighter enforcement of the laws."

== References in popular culture ==
Father Hill debated novelist Gore Vidal on the David Susskind Show on March 17, 1968, in a program called "Read Any Dirty Books Lately?" The previous year, Vidal had published a #1 best-selling novel, Myra Breckenridge, which many considered pornographic. In the sequel to the book, Myron, Vidal used Father Hill's name as a euphemism for a "dirty word" in order to conform to the U.S. Supreme Court's Miller v. California decision that enshrined "community standards" as the legal test for pornography.

== Sources ==
- Obscenity.crimes.org, "FR. MORTON A. HILL, S.J.: Defender of the Public Decencies"
