= Myra Breckinridge =

1968 novel by Gore Vidal

- Cover of the first edition
- Author: Gore Vidal
- Language: English
- Genre: Satire
- Publisher: Little, Brown
- Publication date: February 29, 1968
- Publication place: United States
- Media type: Print (hardback & paperback)
- Pages: 264
- ISBN: 1-125-97948-8
- Dewey Decimal: 813.54
- LC Class: PS3543.I26 M9
- Followed by: Myron

Myra Breckinridge is a 1968 satirical novel by Gore Vidal written in the form of a diary. Described by the critic Dennis Altman as "part of a major cultural assault on the assumed norms of gender and sexuality which swept the western world in the late 1960s and early 1970s", the book's major themes are feminism, transsexuality, American expressions of machismo and patriarchy, and deviant sexual practices, as filtered through an aggressively camp sensibility. The controversial book is also "the first instance of a novel in which the main character undergoes a clinical sex-change". Set in Hollywood in the 1960s, the novel also contains candid and irreverent glimpses into the machinations within the film industry.

Myra Breckinridge was dismissed by some of the era's more conservative critics as pornographic at the time of its first publication in February 1968; nevertheless, the novel immediately became a worldwide bestseller and has since come to be considered a classic in some circles. "It is tempting to argue that Vidal said more to subvert the dominant rules of sex and gender in Myra than is contained in a shelf of queer theory treatises", wrote Dennis Altman. Critic Harold Bloom cites the novel as a canonical work in his book The Western Canon. Vidal called Myra the favorite of his books, and published a sequel, Myron, in 1974.

The novel was adapted into a 1970 film of the same name, which was panned. Vidal disowned the film, calling it "an awful joke".

In his 1995 memoir Palimpsest, Vidal said the voice of Myra may have been inspired by the "megalomania" of Anaïs Nin's diaries. Indeed, the story is told through increasingly erratic entries in Myra's own personal diary and recordings on events given by Buck Loner.

== Plot ==
A beautiful young woman, Myra Breckinridge is a film enthusiast with a special interest in the Golden Age of Hollywood—in particular the 1940s—and the writings of film critic Parker Tyler. In her notebook, she declares her mission is to "re-create the sexes and thus save the human race from certain extinction." She comes to the Academy for Aspiring Young Actors and Actresses in Los Angeles, owned by her deceased husband Myron's uncle, Buck Loner, a former cowboy actor and current lecher. Myra's purpose in visiting Buck is to claim her mother-in-law Gertrude's share of the property, left jointly to Buck and Gertrude by their father when it was an undeveloped orange grove, and through Myron's will transmitted to her. The property is now worth $2 million. Intending to stall her as long as possible, Buck declares his lawyers will look into the matter; in the meantime, he offers Myra work at the Academy teaching the Empathy and Posture classes.

Myra proves radically popular with the students, while soon becoming a thorn in Buck's side. At a student's party, after "mixing gin and marijuana", Myra gets "stoned out of her head" and suffers visions before passing out in a bathroom. Myra attends an orgy arranged by a student. She intends only to observe but suffers a "rude intrusion" by a member of the band The Four Skins, from which she derives a perverse, masochistic enjoyment.

Out of an obscure desire to be avenged on the male sex for the indignities suffered by Myron during his long period of homosexuality, Myra preys upon a student named Rusty Godowski, a muscular ex-footballer, and ultimately anally violates him with a strap on. The rape causes Rusty's relationship with Mary-Ann, his girlfriend and fellow student (whom Myra has taken under her wing), to deteriorate. The two break up, and Rusty begins a relationship with Letitia Van Allen, a casting agent who has sex with the male clients she represents. Rusty, previously a gentle lover, has been transformed by his assault at Myra's hands into a violent and brutish sex partner, to Letitia's great delight. Myra's lesbian overtures to Mary-Ann, conversely, are continually frustrated.

Meanwhile, in a meeting in Buck's office his lawyers produce a trump card: no death certificate exists for Myron Breckinridge in New York, and if he is not dead his will has no legal bearing. At this juncture, Myra stands and reveals her vaginoplasty scars, disclosing that she and Myron are the same person and that she is thus entitled to Gertrude's share of the property. Frightened, disgusted, and shocked, Buck concedes defeat, privately commenting that if he could get away with murdering her he would.

Soon after her triumph, Myra is severely injured in a hit-and-run car accident, and while she is comatose in hospital her breast implants are removed. Upon discovering this when her plaster casts are taken off, Myra attempts suicide. The novel ends with a time-skip to three years in the future; Myra is now living as Myron and is married to Mary-Ann; the two have found moderate success in showbiz, and Myron wonders how he could ever have held such grandiose aspirations.

== Writing ==
Vidal first contemplated writing Myra Breckinridge as a sketch for the risqué revue Oh! Calcutta! but quickly decided to develop the story into a novel. He wrote the first draft in Rome over the course of a month. About two weeks into writing the novel, Vidal decided to make Myra transgender. The name "Breckinridge" was taken from Bunny Breckinridge, an associate of director Ed Wood, and a stage performer whose openly gay, flamboyantly transgressive life partly inspired Vidal's novel.

== Analysis ==
According to critic Robert F. Kiernan, Myra Breckinridge explores the mutability of gender role and sexual orientation as being social constructs established by social mores. The first novel whose main character undergoes a clinical sex-change, it was praised by Edmund Miller as "a brilliantly chosen image for satire of contemporary mores." Arnie Kantrowitz called the titular character a "comic surrogate [who] looks at life from both sides" and "wields a wicked dildo in her war against gender roles". Joseph Cady wrote that the novel "skewers conventional American sexuality".
