= National Center on Sexual Exploitation =

American organization

- Abbreviation: NCOSE
- Founded: 1962; 64 years ago
- Type: Political, media watchdog, anti-pornography
- Tax ID no.: 13-2608326
- Legal status: 501(c)(3) organization
- Location: United States
- President: Marcel Van der Watt
- Website: endsexualexploitation.org
- Formerly called: Operation Yorkville (1962-1968); Morality In Media (1968–2015)

The National Center on Sexual Exploitation (NCOSE), previously known as Morality in Media and Operation Yorkville, is an American conservative anti-pornography organization. The group has also campaigned against sex trafficking, same-sex marriage, sex shops and sex toys, the decriminalization of sex work, comprehensive sex education, and various works of literature or visual arts the organization has deemed obscene, profane or indecent. Its current president is Marcel Van der Watt. The organization describes its goal as "exposing the links between all forms of sexual exploitation".

The group was started as a part of the religious right and was primarily Catholic. It began as an interfaith group of three New York clergymen concerned about pornography and "salacious" magazines. The group became involved in several landmark court battles regarding obscenity laws and freedom of speech in the United States. The group's influence later declined due to the decreasing interest in the anti-obscenity cause among prosecutors, politicians and religious leaders. After modernizing its message from morality to exploitation, the group changed its name. NCOSE have stated that pornography constitutes a public health crisis, but this is not supported by any global health agency, and the organization has been criticized for advancing medical claims that are false, misleading or unsupported.

== History ==
=== Operation Yorkville ===
Operation Yorkville (OY) was founded by an interfaith group of three New York City clergymen in 1962. Father Morton A. Hill of St. Ignatius Loyola Catholic Church became the public face of the group. The group connected exposure to different types of "salacious" magazines and pornography to atheism, obscenity, homosexuality, juvenile delinquency, masturbation, murder, sexually transmitted diseases and "high school sex clubs", but did not provide evidence for its claims. Although the group's actions emphasized the protection of minors, First Amendment Law Review wrote that "at times the organization seemed to be using children as a pretext for a society-wide ban". The group maintained that they were fighting obscenities and not advocating censorship. In 1963, the organization began a long-running effort to ban John Cleland's erotic novel Fanny Hill, which ended with the 1966 Supreme Court decision Memoirs v. Massachusetts.

=== Morality in Media ===
Operation Yorkville was renamed to Morality in Media (MIM) in 1968. Hill, president of MIM until his death in 1985, was appointed to serve on the 18-member President's Commission on Obscenity and Pornography by President Lyndon B. Johnson. A report was submitted in 1970 that said all "adult" obscenity laws should be repealed. Hill called the commission's report a "magna carta for the pornographers". After the four justices nominated by President Richard Nixon reshaped the Supreme Court, the Burger Court disregarded the commission's report and upheld obscenity laws in 1973, citing the dissenting reports by Hill, minister Winfrey Link and Charles Keating, the leader of the Citizens for Decent Literature. In 1973, a member of the group complained to the Federal Communications Commission (FCC) about George Carlin's anti-censorship routine "Seven Dirty Words", leading to the 1978 decision FCC v. Pacifica Foundation. In 1980, the organization launched an unsuccessful lawsuit over the New York premiere of the film Caligula. The group also condemned the Monty Python film Life of Brian as a "direct, aggressive, deliberate violation of the rights of believing persons". In 1983, MIM asked for federal action against pornography in a White House meeting with President Ronald Reagan.

In the 1990s, the organization attacked the National Endowment for the Arts for funding what it deemed as obscene and profane art. The group also pressured adult stores by picketing them, contacting landlords and prosecutors and by lobbying for changes in zoning laws. In 1992, the group called for a boycott of all Time Warner products due to the publication of Madonna's book Sex. In the mid-1990s, MIM was part of a religious boycott campaign against The Walt Disney Company after they began offering spousal benefits to same-sex partners of employees. The organization was an active supporter of the 1996 Communications Decency Act, although the group stated that many of its proposals were not implemented. After the Supreme Court struck down the law as unconstitutional in Reno v. American Civil Liberties Union, MIM began advocating for internet filters. Primarily Catholic, the organization joined other groups in the religious right to criticize the Waxman report, which found that abstinence-only sex education programs were unscientific and contained false information. MIM has argued that safer-sex information is indecent.

Once affiliated with the Christian Coalition, MIM would state that it "strongly upholds traditional family values and Judeo-Christian precepts". The organization was part of the Coalition for Marriage, a religious right collective that sought a ban on the partner recognition of gay couples and opposed the anti-discrimination laws protecting LGBT people. After the 2009 Binghamton shootings happened on the same day as Iowa's Supreme Court legalized same-sex marriage, the organization released a statement titled "Connecting the Dots: The Line Between Gay Marriage and Mass Murders". The group's president Bob Peters said that the sexual revolution and the "decline of morality" were the underlying cause of mass murders. In 2010, MIM hoped that government officials would take action against adult stores and sex toys, which Peters likened to "a cancer, a slow-moving cancer". The organization's influence had declined due to the decreasing interest in the anti-obscenity cause among prosecutors, politicians and religious leaders. Peters conceded that "the war is over and we have lost".

=== National Center on Sexual Exploitation ===
The group's CEO and president at the time of the name change was Patrick A. Trueman, an attorney and a registered lobbyist. He served as Chief of the Child Exploitation and Obscenity Section, a United States Department of Justice Criminal Division, when the George H. W. Bush administration aggressively prosecuted obscenity cases against adult pornography. The organization underwent its most significant change in 2015 when it rebranded into the National Center on Sexual Exploitation (NCOSE) in order to expand its focus to the social science and data on the intersectionality of sexual exploitation. Publishing in Sexuality Research and Social Policy, Ronald Weitzer writes that the name change reflects the group's modernization of their image "from morality to exploitation", at the same time where the group introduced medicalizing language that "secularized" their arguments. NCOSE's flagship campaign is their Dirty Dozen List, an annual list of "mainstream facilitators of sexual exploitation". In 2015, the organization successfully pressured Walmart to remove Cosmopolitan from its checkout aisles. In 2016, NCOSE criticized Amnesty International after the human rights group joined Human Rights Watch and the World Health Organization in supporting the decriminalization of sex work. NCOSE said the policy was irresponsible and that decriminalization would encourage human trafficking. The group has also opposed legalized prostitution in Nevada. In 2017, the organization was one of the principal supporters of the Allow States and Victims to Fight Online Sex Trafficking Act (FOSTA).

Elizabeth Nolan Brown of Reason has criticized the group for promoting claims about sexuality and pornography that she claims contradict the findings of peer-reviewed studies. Brown has also noted of the group: "The purity culture ethos of shame, abstinence, and fallen women still permeates these groups' activism. But it's been repackaged as a bid to protect women and kids from trauma and sexual harm rather than to uphold the sanctity of marriage and biblical womanhood." Anti-Trafficking Review made assertions against NCOSE by claiming they "use misleading 'research reports' to fabricate a false medical consensus about the harms of pornography". Since the 2010s, the group has stated that pornography constitutes a public health crisis. NCOSE drafted much of the language when Utah passed a resolution labeling pornography a "public health hazard leading to a broad spectrum of individual and public health impacts and societal harms". The resolution called for action against "the pornography epidemic that is harming the citizens of Utah and the nation". The claims are not backed by global health agencies, and outside experts criticized the language for its assertions. 15 other states replicated the resolution using mostly identical language.

On December 19 2023, Dawn Hawkins, CEO of NCOSE released a statement apologising for past harm done to the LGBTQ community

NCOSE has roots in and ties with extreme-right and anti-gay organizations.

On September 2, 2025, Ron DeHaas, chairman of NCOSE's board of directors, resigned after his 38-year-old stepson was charged with felony child sexual abuse and using computers to commit a crime. DeHaas covered some of his stepson’s $300,000 bond and facilitated his release from jail. DeHaas is the founder of Covenant Eyes which sells accountability applications for monitoring online access to sexual content.

NCOSE has also been accused of making pseudoscientific claims. According to Alexander Monea, "NCOSE is also particularly interesting for our case because it demonstrates a blend of alt-right arguments, woke Leftist arguments, pseudoscientific takes on scientific research, and traditional evangelical conservative positions on gender and sexuality. NCOSE thus perfectly demonstrates how crusades against pornography make for unlikely bedfellows."

== Campaigns ==
The organization operations can be categorized into three primary areas: grassroots corporate and legislative advocacy, legal advocacy through its law center, and public awareness and education.

=== Grassroots Corporate and Legislative Advocacy ===
==== EARN IT Act ====
The National Center on Sexual Exploitation was one of over 70 groups that came out in support of the controversial EARN IT Act in 2020 and called it "the best piece of accountability in the tech space since the passage of FOSTA-SESTA in 2018, which makes it illegal for interactive computer services to knowingly facilitate sex trafficking."

==== EBSCO controversy ====
In 2017, NCOSE placed EBSCO on its Dirty Dozen List because its databases, widely used in schools in the United States, "could be used to search for information about sexual terms." The group said that some articles from Men's Health and other publications indexed by EBSCO included articles with sexual (but not pornographic) content, and that other articles in the database linked to websites that included pornography. EBSCO responded by saying that it took the complaint seriously, but was unaware of any case "of students using its databases to access pornography or other explicit materials" and that "the searches NCOSE was concerned about had been conducted by adults actively searching for graphic materials, often on home computers that don't have the kinds of controls and filters common on school computers."

James LaRue, the director of the American Library Association's Office for Intellectual Freedom, said that students have a right to receive information, even about topics that some groups deem inappropriate. He said that NCOSE's goal seems to be to get rid of any content "that will offend any parent in America." "NCOSE has the right to advocate for greater restrictions on access to sexual content", said LaRue, "but they often do this by suppressing content. When they try to impose their standards on other families, the American Library Association would call that censorship." NCOSE also put the American Library Association on their Dirty Dozen List, along with Amazon.com.

==== Pornhub ====
The National Center on Sexual Exploitation has advocated against pornography for decades and has taken aim at adult website Pornhub many times, including efforts to convince payment processing companies to stop working with the MindGeek-owned pornography site. One of NCOSE's lawyers was mentioned by Nicholas Kristof in his article "The Children of Pornhub" for The New York Times in December 2020—a piece which may have been influential in Visa and Mastercard's decisions to stop working with Pornhub.

On April 13, 2021, an article in Vice alleged that the National Center on Sexual Exploitation's rhetoric risked spilling over into real-world violence. The organization responded by alleging that institutionalized racism in pornography "fuel[ed] the demand for radicalized sexual violence."

==== Visa and Mastercard ====
In the early months of 2020, the National Center on Sexual Exploitation led a group of NGOs from around a dozen countries internationally in a grassroots public advocacy effort in hopes of pressuring payment processing companies to recognize the allegations of abuse and criminality being levied by groups like NCOSE against pornography websites and cut ties with them. In December 2020, in the wake of that campaign and a public awareness boost from an Opinion article about Pornhub by Nicholas Kristof in The New York Times, both Visa and Mastercard announced their intentions to end their work with Pornhub.

==== Technology companies ====
NCOSE criticized Parler after the events at the U.S. Capitol Building on January 6, 2021, saying that Parler has failed to moderate violence on its platform. It also criticized Google and Amazon for their treatment of sexual violence and exploitation in their platforms and products.

After the Facebook Files were leaked by whistleblower Frances Haugen in October 2021, NCOSE called for the United States Congress to regulate Big Tech companies, saying, "Time and again, Big Tech has proven that it cannot regulate itself, and therefore Congress must step in".

=== Legal advocacy through the NCOSE Law Center ===
==== Wyndham ====
In early 2020, a lawsuit against Wyndham Hotels was brought by the National Center on Sexual Exploitation Law Center on behalf of a child sex trafficking survivor who was serially raped in Wyndham hotels.

==== Twitter ====
The National Center on Sexual Exploitation Law Center issued a lawsuit against Twitter, Inc. in January 2021. The lawsuit, John Doe v Twitter, claimed that Twitter had knowingly refused to remove widely-shared child sexual abuse material (a.k.a. child pornography) even after Doe verified his age to Twitter and requested it be taken down. According to the legal filing, Twitter's response to Doe said that its investigation "didn't find a violation of [Twitter's] policies, so no action will be taken." The lawsuit said that the video was removed after Doe's mother contacted an agent of the US Department of Homeland Security, who contacted Twitter about the matter.

As of August 2021, a second plaintiff was represented in the lawsuit, referred to as John Doe #2. In August 2021, Chief Magistrate Judge Joseph C. Spero of the U.S. District Court for the Northern District of California said that the plaintiffs could proceed with a claim that Twitter Inc. benefited from sex trafficking involving them as teenagers when it published child pornography videos (a.k.a. child sexual abuse material) on its website.

==== MindGeek/Pornhub ====
MindGeek, an international corporation that owns and operates sites like Pornhub, found itself the target of a class action lawsuit brought by NCOSE and several other law firms in February 2021. The litigation, a federal class action lawsuit, alleges that MindGeek hosted multiple rape videos of child sex trafficking victims and profited from that material while not doing anything to verify the age or consent of the children in the material. During the same month (February 2021), the Canadian Parliament began hearings to investigate the allegations against Pornhub.

==== WebGroup Czech Republic/XVideos ====
The world's most-visited pornography website, XVideos, was prominently included as a part of a class action lawsuit against its parent company, WebGroup Czech Republic, that was filed by the National Center on Sexual Exploitation Law Center and several partnering law firms in March 2021. The lawsuit, filed on behalf of Plaintiff Jane Doe, alleges that the company benefited from a sex trafficking venture and distributing child pornography (a.k.a. child sexual abuse material), and also failed to report child sexual abuse material.

The case was dismissed with prejudice. That has been appealed to the Ninth Circuit Court of Appeals. On 2 January 2024, that Court partly reversed, partly vacated, and remanded the case, the essence being that the District Court has to properly investigate whether it has jurisdiction over those foreign entities.

In February 2025, the case was dismissed with prejudice. Litigation continues before the US Court of Appeals, Ninth Circuit.

=== Nevada brothel ===
Their plead against a Nevada brothel contained overt fabrications (AI hallucinations), both in its initial filing, and in the subsequent filing aiming to correct its mistakes.

== Funding ==
The organization has previously received funding from Philip Anschutz and the Coors Brewing Company family. Joseph Coors was also a member of the organization's board of directors. U.S. Department of Justice (DOJ) grants of $150,000 in the 2005 and 2006 federal budgets funded Morality in Media's review of citizen-generated obscenity complaints submitted to the group's ObscenityCrimes.org website. MIM deemed 67,000 complaints legitimate by August 2007 and referred them to the DOJ, but the program never resulted in a prosecution. The grants were created by Congressional earmarks by U.S. Representative Frank Wolf of Virginia.

== See also ==
- Abiding Truth Ministries
- American Family Association
- Christian fundamentalism
- Christian nationalism
- Christian right
- Culture war
- LGBT rights opposition
- Religious views on pornography
- Effects of pornography
- New Right
- Radical right (United States)
- Religion and homosexuality
