= Religious views on pornography =

Religious views on pornography are based on the broader views of religions on topics such as modesty, dignity, and sexuality. Different religious groups view pornography and sexuality differently.

== Christianity ==
=== Biblical scholarship ===
There is no direct prohibition of pornography in the Bible. However, many Christians base their views on pornography on Matthew 5:27–28 (part of the Expounding of the Law):

Ye have heard that it was said by them of old time, Thou shalt not commit adultery: But I say unto you, That whosoever looketh on a woman to lust after her hath committed adultery with her already in his heart.

It contains one of the Ten Commandments, Exodus 20:14 or Deuteronomy 5:18, which is also used often as a supporting verse to condemn pornography.

Michael Coogan reports that, based on his past experience, the campaign against lustful thoughts had the consequence of razoring the Song of Songs from the Bibles available for seminarians.

Ken Stone cites Origen's words to say that reading the Song of Songs may stimulate lust to 'fleshly' readers: "But if any man who lives only after the flesh shall approach [the Song of Songs], to such a one the reading of this Scripture will be the occasion of no small hazard and danger. For he, not knowing how to hear love's language in purity and with chaste ears, will twist the whole manner of his hearing of it away from the inner spiritual man and on to the outward and carnal; and he will be turned away from the spirit to the flesh, and will foster carnal desires in himself, and it will seem to be the Divine Scriptures that are thus urging and egging him on to fleshly lust!" Stone adds that "the heavy use of food imagery in the book is no barrier to a positive 'pornographic' interpretation."

Richard Hess explains Carey E. Walsh's view as: "Walsh has determined that the emphasis of the Song lies in the expression of desire between two lovers. It is not sexual consummation that is most important, but the desire itself that drives the lovers together. In this she distinguishes erotica from pornography. The latter is concerned only with sex, and in this it is qualitatively different from the Song. Here sex plays a secondary role to desire. Whether there is any sexual activity at all in the poem—and as a fantasy there may be no such reality here—the key to the Song remains with the desire that drives the reader to appreciate the time of waiting. Hebrew experience placed the greatest value on passion." Saying that the Song of Songs is "erotica", not pornography, she argues that both are different in at least three ways: (1) Erotica inclines toward "emotions and internal worlds" of a subject to seek empathy, while pornography's "emotional flatness" aims at sexual gratification; (2) Erotica focuses on yearning to reach "consummation", which may occur in "tortuous delay", while pornography is only about the "acts" to reach it as soon as possible and "a frenzy of repetition"; (3) Erotica uses imagination as the "invisible and ever-active participant" without revealing the "mystery of love", while pornography is no more than an explicit story of sexual intercourse.

=== Roman Catholicism ===
The magisterium of the Catholic Church interprets Matthew 5:27–28 to mean that since the purpose of pornography is to create lust, it is sinful, because lusting is equivalent to adultery. As the Catechism of the Catholic Church explains:

Pornography consists in removing real or simulated sexual acts from the intimacy of the partners, in order to display them deliberately to third parties. It offends against chastity because it perverts the conjugal act, the intimate giving of spouses to each other. It does grave injury to the dignity of its participants (actors, vendors, the public), since each one becomes an object of base pleasure and illicit profit for others. It immerses all who are involved in the illusion of a fantasy world. It is a grave offense. Civil authorities should prevent the production and distribution of pornographic materials.

Cardinal Karol Wojtyla, before he became Pope John Paul II, wrote in Love and Responsibility: "Pornography is a marked tendency to accentuate the sexual element when reproducing the human body or human love in a work of art, with the object of inducing the reader or viewer to believe that sexual values are the only real values of the person, and that love is nothing more than the experience, individual or shared, of those values alone." Edward Sri explains about the topic of art and pornography, which is discussed in the book by contrasting Michelangelo's works with Playboy, by saying that "good art leads us to a peaceful contemplation of the true, the good and the beautiful, including the truth, goodness and beauty of the human body", while pornography "stirs in us a sensuous craving for the body of another person as an object to be exploited for our own pleasure" and, if it is left uncontrolled, "we will become enslaved to everything that stimulates our sensual desire". When one constantly views pornography, which is focused merely on "the visible and the erotic", and reduces the human person to what is visible with the eyes, he or she will have difficulties relating to people of different gender in real life, since he or she would have become accustomed to seeing them as "objects to be used".

In a series of lectures called the Theology of the Body, Pope John Paul II argues that some works of art depict naked individuals without evoking lust, but "makes it possible to concentrate, in a way, on the whole truth of man, and the dignity and beauty—also the 'suprasensual' beauty—of his masculinity and feminity", and that such works "bear within them, almost hidden, an element of sublimation". He insists that pornography is problematic since "it fails to portray everything that is human".

=== Eastern Orthodox ===
Eastern Orthodox Church forbids pornography along with premarital sex. Looking lustfully is equal to adultery by Christ's teaching, and linked to prostitution too.

=== Protestantism ===
Harry Reid notes that, during the Reformation, "Calvin's aim was straightforward, if ambitious; he wanted to create a perfect Christian community where everyone looked after everyone else... He persuaded the council to legislate against adultery, prostitution, pornography, gambling, drunkenness and much else."

According to Manetsch, the Genevan Consistory regularly censured literature they deemed dangerous for public morals, including pornography. Oboler also notes that pornography was censored in Geneva and Puritan New England in order to defend against "ungodly eroticism".

Max Weber argued that there was a concern that eroticism was a kind of idolatry that went against God's rational regulation of sexuality through marriage alone.

Martin E. Marty notes that, today, both mainstream and evangelical Protestants remain overwhelmingly opposed to pornography and that you will find "very, very few theological statements that go light on pornography."

According to Addicted to Lust: Pornography in the Lives of Conservative Protestants (2019) written by Samuel L. Perry, professor of Sociology and Religious studies at the University of Oklahoma, Conservative Protestants in the United States are characterized by a "sexual exceptionalism" related to their consumption of pornography due to certain pervasive beliefs within the Conservative Protestant subculture, which entails cognitive dissonance associated with the unfounded conviction to be addicted to pornography, psychological distress, and intense feelings of guilt, shame, self-loathing, depression, and sometimes withdrawal from faith altogether.

Perry's book received widespread media coverage and his findings were criticized by Lyman Stone of the Evangelical magazine Christianity Today, which asserted that both the quantitative and qualitative statistical data collected by Perry demonstrate that the consumption of pornography in the United States is significantly lower among church-attending Protestant Christians compared to other religious groups, and declared that "Protestant men today who attend church regularly are basically the only men in America still resisting the cultural norm of regularized pornography use".

==== Lutheranism ====
In 1990, the Lutheran Church of Australia condemned pornography by publishing an official position on "X-rated videos".

Doctor John Kleinig, Lecturer Emeritus at the Australian Lutheran College, argues that, "The regular use of pornography for masturbation is a kind of sexual addiction. When Paul speaks about impurity and sexual greed as idolatry in Ephesians 5:3-7 and Colossians 3:5, he accurately describes how it works. It begins with sexual impurity, the defilement of our imagination by depictions of sexual intercourse that present naked bodies as idols for us to admire. Our fixation on these images arouses disordered desires and make us more and more greedy for sexual satisfaction from things that God has not given to us for our enjoyment. Yet they fail to satisfy us and serve only to feed our growing appetite for them... Where masturbation is involved... the more ashamed we become, the more secretive we become; the more secretive we become and the more we hide in the darkness, the more vulnerable we become to the accusation and condemnation of Satan... You need to be careful that Satan does not distort your perception by making a fool of you and getting you to focus on the wrong thing. Nowhere in the Bible is masturbation explicitly forbidden. There is good reason for this because the problem does not come from masturbation, which is in itself neither good or bad, but the adulterous sexual fantasies that accompany it, as Christ makes clear in Matthew 5:28. That’s the problem spiritually! ... That’s how Satan gets a hold on us through our imagination. If you use pornography to masturbate, you put another woman, an idol that promises heaven and gives you hell, sexually, in the place of your wife. It arouses your greed for what you don’t have, greed for what God has not given for you to enjoy, greed that increases as you give in to it. The more you indulge it, the more dissatisfied and empty you become."

The Evangelical Church in Germany (EKD) condemns pornography. The Church refuses to invest in any company producing pornography, stating that, "Human dignity is based on the belief that women and men are created in God's image. This results in the mission to protect this dignity against derogatory, denigrating, or degrading portrayals. The analysis of this criterion should not only consider pornographic products, but also the producers of videos depicting violence and likewise computer games glamourizing violence."

In a statement on the role of the media, the EKD's 1997 synod stated, "According to the churches, public broadcasting plays a vital role in guaranteeing the freedom of opinion and access to a variety of information in Germany. Maintaining and strengthening this system, which is "almost unique" in the world, is "imperative", said Bishop Engelhardt... In view of its greater freedom in producing programmes, it has "a special obligation to practise voluntary control". Now that "violations of taboos and norms" are constantly increasing, public control and self-regulation of the media must be increased. This also applies to the protection of "religious convictions", said Bishop Lehmann. First attempts made by German Internet providers to introduce voluntary self-regulation need to be improved. Nothing glorifying violence, instigating racial hatred, violating human dignity, glorifying war or pornography must be available on-line..."

The EKD's 1997 synod also "spoke out for action against child pornography on the Internet. All legal methods must be applied to counteract it. Additionally, the German government should pursue sharper criminal proceedings against people who traffic in women."

The Church of Sweden declared, "It is not permissible [for us] to invest in media companies that have a clear link to pornography."

==== Calvinism ====
The United Protestant Church of France (EPUdf) teaches that pornography is a sin. According to Pastor Gilles Boucomont, "The Bible does not talk about pornography. It says that sexuality is lived properly as part of a commitment, marriage. Outside of this context, sexuality is adultery if one is already married or sexual misconduct if one is not yet married. Misconduct and adultery break the unity that God wants for the married man and woman (1 Corinthians 6 and 7, Mark 10: 1-12)... Watching pornography is not doing a sexual act with anyone, certainly. However, Jesus considers that adultery begins in the eye (Matthew 5,28). There is also no need for a large dissertation to explain that viewing such films does not favor the formation or continuity of stable couples. The second aspect of our problem lies in our responsibility for the people who shoot such films. Jesus asks us to love our neighbor as ourselves. If we do not think we have to surrender our bodies for money, because that is not God's good will for the human, we can not support this practice." Masturbation is also considered sinful.

On the topic of non-sexual nudity, the EPUdf teaches, "Sin is what separates me from God or comes from my separation from Him. Therefore, nudity, whether sexual or not, must be considered in the context of relationships with God and others. Going to a mixed sauna ... if it's only with my partner, in my opinion, I do not see the problem... If it is with other people, it seems to me legitimate to ask questions about the temptation that can arise and the reasons that make me go. If there is already a habit of nudity in the civilization to which I belong, it may also not be of a nature to distract me from God. I think it's the same for the nude."

The Calvinist Protestant Church of Switzerland also condemns pornography. Pastor Jean-Charles Bichet writes, "Pornography... gives a distorted image of sexuality. It can cause more problems than it solves... And the sad thing about all this is that it gives the opportunity for a juicy trade . People who agree to pose for photos or to play X rated scenes have not all chosen to do so. By consuming porn, humans are also taking responsibility for this kind of trafficking. In this sense, we are sinners because we find ourselves involved in this general problem of society. The Bible does not specifically refer to pornography, but it often makes harsh judgments about the exploitation of people and prostitution. It reminds us that we are all created in the image of God, that we are little brothers and sisters of Jesus, the Son of God, live in liberated and happy people. The Bible constantly reminds us that none of us is a commodity. None of us should be treated like a shirt that is thrown away."

In the 1980s, the liberal Presbyterian Church (USA) produced a report entitled, Pornography: Far from the Song of Songs, which states, "Through words and images, pornography debases God’s intended gifts of love and dignity in human sexuality... we live in an age also marked by the shattering of many norms of behavior and the subsequent loss of moral restraints. In such a time pornography has proliferated. The task force believes that the church is called to give serious attention to this issue... Reflected in the title of this report is the conviction that pornography represents human discord, far from the mutual sexual delight depicted biblically in the Song of Songs. Pornography is a striking sign of human brokenness and alienation from God and from one another... From the perspective of biblical understanding and the Reformed tradition, pornography represents a vivid expression of human alienation: from the creator God who makes covenants and from one another as covenant partners of God."

In its church magazine, the Presbyterian Church in Canada argues against pornography on the grounds that it is addictive, it alters the brain, that pornographers are trying to normalize the industry and that it can distract Christians who are trying to perform nightly devotions.

==== Methodism ====
The United Methodist Church teaches that pornography is "about violence, degradation, exploitation, and coercion" and it "deplore[s] all forms of commercialization, abuse, and exploitation of sex". It defines pornography as "sexually explicit material that portrays violence, abuse, coercion, domination, humiliation, or degradation for the purpose of arousal. In addition, any sexually explicit material that depicts children is pornographic". The Sexual Ethics Task Force of The United Methodist Church states that "Research shows that [pornography] is not an 'innocent activity.' It is harmful and is generally addictive. Persons who are addicted to pornography are physiologically altered, as is their perspective, relationships with parishioners and family, and their perceptions of girls and women."

The liberal-leaning Uniting Church of Australia also condemns pornography and works in society to address the problem.

==== Quakers ====
In 1990, Quakers declared, "Since pornographic materials promote and propagate a lifestyle that includes activities which are condemned by God's Word and tempt viewers to commit the sin of lust (Matthew 5:27-28: Romans 13:14; II Peter 2:14, 18-19), Friends therefore are urged to carefully avoid exposure to such materials. Because of our responsibility as Christian citizens (Matthew 5:13; Proverbs 14:34) and in view of the evil, exploitative, and destructive effects of pornography on individuals, families, and our society, Friends are encouraged to prayerfully and boldly oppose the production and distribution of pornographic materials in their local communities, as well as at the state and national levels (Ephesians 5:11)."

==== Mennonites ====
Mennonites believe pornography is sinful. In a major report, the Mennonite Central Committee notes, "One misconception is that adult pornography has no victims: it’s a harmless, pleasurable activity which damages no one. Yet, research and experience increasingly show that pornography does cause harm: to one’s relationship with God, to human relationships, to the user, to those in the industry and to society in general." The report goes on to elaborate how it causes this harm.

==== Evangelicalism ====
In 2002, researcher Martin E. Marty noted that, "... most of the anti-porn activity is indeed from fundamentalist and evangelical groups... What keeps [American] mainstream Protestants from being consistently up front on an issue that... quite possibly leads to rape and other crimes, demeans the "user," and benefits the billions-per-year exploiter, has little to do with pornography. Instead it connects with their heavy commitment to free speech, their fear lest countering pornography in communications might erode the defenses against intrusions on precious liberties. Such Protestants are slow to promote boycotts and extremely cautious about legislation in areas so necessarily ill-defined as pornography. Caught between their abhorrence of pornography and their passion for liberties and rights, mainline Protestants, most Catholics, Reform Jews, and others have not found effective ways to be up front on this important front."

Two other American researchers, Sherkat and Ellison, produced a study which shows, "that Conservative Protestant opposition to pornography is rooted in commitments to Biblical inerrancy and solidified by high rates of religious participation. Inerrancy serves as a cognitive resource informing two separate paths to pornography opposition: moral absolutism and beliefs in the threat of social contamination."

Jerry Falwell has criticized pornography, saying sex is reserved for heterosexual married couples, to be used only in accordance with God's will (more specifically, to both solidify the emotional bonds between the man and his lawfully wedded wife, and to help propagate the human race ["Be fruitful, and multiply."]), and asserts that use of pornography involves indulgence in lust towards people other than one's spouse (which in Christianity is a sin) and leads to an overall increase in sexually immoral behavior (including, for example, adultery, rape, and/or even child molestation).

William M. Struthers in his book, Wired for Intimacy, has criticized pornography from a scientific viewpoint, suggesting that the viewing and use of pornography embeds abnormal neural pathways in the brain such that the desire for physical sexual relations may become subverted over time.

==== Anglicanism ====
The 1998 Lambeth Conference Resolution I.10 states, "... Clearly some expressions of sexuality are inherently contrary to the Christian way and are sinful. Such unacceptable expression of sexuality include promiscuity, prostitution, incest, pornography, paedophilia, predatory sexual behaviour, and sadomasochism (all of which may be heterosexual and homosexual), adultery, violence against wives, and female circumcision. From a Christian perspective these forms of sexual expression remain sinful in any context. We are particularly concerned about the pressures on young people to engage in sexual activity at an early age, and we urge our Churches to teach the virtue of abstinence."

The Anglican Diocese of Melbourne published an article which noted that, "Pornography is prostitution, as men pay money, time and dignity for gratification. This payment might not be direct, but the support of pornography feeds the human trafficking industry, in which some 27 million women and children are trapped worldwide. The harlot that used to be on the street corner is now our computer."

The Anglican Diocese of Sydney has established an "Archbishop's Taskforce for Resisting Pornography", which at the end of 2017, was seeking to establish a "resistingporn.org" website. The taskforce chairman has noted, "We know porn can alter desires and can affect self-control and compulsive behaviours. Studies have shown that the brains of long-term porn users behave similarly to those of drug addicts. There are also other effects... such as increasing incidences of adultery and earlier first-time sexual activity. It also goes without saying pornography is incompatible with God’s good purposes for the world."

=== Mormonism ===
Gordon B. Hinckley, president of the Church of Jesus Christ of Latter-day Saints (LDS Church) from 1995 to 2008, was known within the faith for expounding his organization's sentiments against pornography. The LDS Church teaches that pornography is "any material depicting or describing the human body or sexual conduct in a way that arouses sexual feelings. It is as harmful to the spirit as tobacco, alcohol, and drugs are to the body. Members of the Church should avoid pornography in any form and should oppose its production, distribution, and use."

As part of teaching the law of chastity, LDS Church leaders have repeatedly condemned the use of sexually arousing literature and visual material for decades.

== Other Abrahamic religions ==
=== Judaism ===
Maimonides, in his Mishneh Torah, writes, based on the Talmud, that "A person who stares at even a small finger of a woman with the intent of deriving pleasure is considered as if he looked at her genitalia. It is even forbidden to hear the voice of a woman with whom sexual relations are prohibited, or to look at her hair." This is further codified in the Code of Jewish Law, which includes further prohibitions (based on the Talmud) such as "watching women as they do the laundry." Accordingly, pornography would be forbidden a fortiori.

Additionally, Jewish laws of modesty and humility (tzniut) require Jewish men and women to dress modestly. Jewish law thus precludes Jewish men & women from engaging in pornographic modelling or acting, besides other acts of immodesty.

The issue is also, according to Chabad.org, one of personal control over one's urges, which pornography, it is asserted, takes away.

Michael Coogan stated that the Tanakh does not have any specific laws relating to pornography and Judaism has always had a positive attitude to sex. Some contemporary thinkers opine that the Bible itself contains erotica, such as the Song of Songs. However, most commentators understand that Song of Songs was meant as an allegory, and that it is forbidden to think of such holy things as erotica, which can arouse impure thoughts.

=== Islam ===
In the 151st verse of the chapter Al-An'am in the Qur'an, among the five chief commandments of Allah, the fourth states: "do not even draw to things shameful - be they open or secret." Nudity is considered to be shameful and fahisha in Islam.

The Qur'an 24:30 states: "Say to the believers to lower the gaze and to guard their carnal desires."

The Qur'an 24:31 states: "And tell the believing women to lower their gaze and keep covered their private parts, and that they should not show-off their beauty except what is apparent, and let them cast their shawls over their cleavage. And let them not show off their beauty except to their husbands... "

Muhammad is quoted as saying: "Looking at women is a poisoned arrow from the arrows of the devil. Whoever restrains his eye out of fear of God Most High is given a faith that he perceives in his soul…. The eye commits adultery just as the genitals. The adultery of the eye is looking."

According to Indonesia's foremost Islamic preacher, Abdullah Gymnastiar, shame is a noble emotion commanded in the Qur'an and was held high by Muhammad himself who was quoted as saying, "Faith is compiled of seventy branches… and shame is one of them." In order to cultivate shame in the believers heart, sexual gaze needs to be checked as unchecked gaze is believed to be the door through which Satan enters and soils the believers heart. In 2006, during the anti-pornography protests in Indonesia (the world's most populous Muslim-majority country) over publication of the inaugural Indonesian edition of Playboy magazine, Abdullah called for legislation to ban pornography and embarked on a mission to shroud the state with a sense of shame saying "the more shameful, the more faithful." Indonesia's foremost Islamic newspaper Republika ran daily front-page editorials featuring a logo of the word pornografi crossed out with a red X. Playboy's Jakarta office was ransacked by the members of Islamic Defenders Front (Front Pembela Islam or FPI), bookstore owners were threatened to not sell any issue of the magazine. Consequently, in December 2008, Indonesian lawmakers signed an anti-pornography bill into law with overwhelming political support.

According to some Shafi‘i jurists, it is not forbidden to look at the image of women's body in the water or in the mirror even with lust. Ibn Abidin, a Hanafi jurist, wrote: "I couldn't find anything about the disadvantage of looking at pictured private parts, let them be investigated." It is speculated that some of the Ottoman sultans considered as caliphs had obscene miniatures in their miniature collections.

== Indian religions ==
=== Sikhism ===
Although there is no direct prohibition of pornography in Sikhism, Sikhs argue that pornographic books and films, prostitution, and lust leads to adultery. Pornography is said to encourage lust (Kaam), which is a concept described as an unhealthy obsession for sex and sexual activity. Kaam is classed as one of the 'Five Thieves', personality traits which are heavily discouraged for Sikhs, as they "can build barriers against God in their lives".

=== Buddhism ===
In the Buddhist Pali Canon, Gautama Buddha renounced (Pali: nekkhamma) sensuality (kama) as a route to Enlightenment. Some Buddhists recite daily the Five Precepts, a commitment to abstain from "sexual misconduct" (kāmesu micchacara กาเมสุ มิจฺฉาจารา). The Dhammika Sutta (Sn 2.14) includes a precept in which the Buddha enjoins a follower to "observe celibacy"

=== Hinduism ===
One of the central concepts of Hinduism is that of Purushartha, which is understood as the meaning or purpose of human existence. It essentially advocates the pursuit of the four main proper goals for a happy life, namely: Dharma (righteous living, performance of ones duty), Artha (money, wealth), Kama (sensual delight, sensory pleasures) and Moksha (spiritual knowledge, self-actualization).

The pursuit of Kama is elaborated by Vatsyayana in his treatise Kamasutra; where he opined that just as good food is necessary for the well-being of the body, good pleasure is necessary for the healthy existence of a human being. A life devoid of pleasure and enjoyment—sexual, artistic, of nature—is hollow and empty. Just as no one stops from farming crops even though everyone knows about the existence of birds, animals and insects that will try to eat the crop, in the same way claims Vatsyayana, one should not stop one's pursuit of kama just because dangers exist. Kama should be pursued with thought, care, caution and enthusiasm, like farming or any other pursuit in life.

== Others ==
=== Satanism ===
Contemporary Satanism is generally supportive of pornography production and consumption, and Satanists have even been involved in production of pornographic films. However, many members of the Church of Satan criticise mainstream contemporary pornography, but on aesthetic rather than moral grounds.

== See also ==
- Chastity
- Fornication
- Religious views on masturbation
- Religion and sexuality
