= Anti-pornography movement in the United Kingdom =

The anti-pornography movement in the United Kingdom is a social movement that seeks to reduce the availability of pornography in the country. The movement originates from two distinct perspectives: some feminists oppose pornography because they regard it as a means of degrading women, while some conservatives (both religiously-motivated and secular) view it as immoral. The movement has had some influence over legislation, resulting in a number of laws intended to restrict the availability of certain genres of pornography which are legal in a number of other countries. Feminists Against Censorship have described the movement as more concerted and better organised than similar movements in other Western liberal democracies.

== 1970s ==
Mary Whitehouse and Lord Longford were well known for their anti-pornography campaigns during the 1970s and 1980s.

During the 1970s, there emerged several anti-pornography groups, including legislatively focused groups such as Campaign Against Pornography and Campaign Against Pornography and Censorship, as well as groups associated with Revolutionary Feminism such as Women Against Violence Against Women and its direct action offshoot Angry Women. Opposition to violent or degrading pornography continues to this day from radical feminists who continue to fight the feminist sex wars.

== Conservative and religious opposition ==
Strong opposition to pornography in the United Kingdom has come from the Christian pressure group Mediawatch-UK (formerly known as the National Viewers and Listeners Association). The organisation, which was founded and led by the social activist Mary Whitehouse until 1991, wishes to criminalise possession of pornography.

== Campaign against violent pornography ==
A campaign to restrict the availability of violent pornography on the Internet was launched in 2004 following the murder of Jane Longhurst by Graham Coutts, a man who had viewed Internet pornography, particularly strangulation fetish sites. A concern that there could be a link between the crime and what the Government termed "extreme pornography" led to calls from Longhurst's mother Liz, the police, MP Martin Salter and Home Secretary David Blunkett to ban such websites. A campaign by the Government and Liz Longhurst collected a petition of over 50,000 signatures calling for a ban on "extreme internet sites promoting violence against women in the name of sexual gratification". The Home Office carried out a consultation on proposals to criminalise possession of "extreme pornographic material" which found 63% of responses opposed to a new law. However, legislation was supported by anti-pornography groups Mediawatch and Mediamarch as well as some radical feminists, such as Julie Bindel. Some of those responding to the Government consultation, especially police organizations, felt that the proposal should go much further, and that tighter restriction on all pornography should be imposed. On 30 August 2006 the UK government announced that it intended to legislate to criminalise the possession of "extreme pornography", the first time that possession of pornography depicting adults would be an offence in the UK. In 2009, section 63 of the Criminal Justice and Immigration Act 2008 criminalised the possession of some forms of pornography, including violent pornography. The offence is punishable by up to 3 years in prison.

In September 2008, Scotland announced its own plans to criminalise possession of "extreme" pornography—extending the law further, including depictions of rape imagery and other non-consensual penetrative sexual activity (whether or not the participants actually consented). The new law is included in Section 42 of the Criminal Justice and Licensing (Scotland) Act 2010, and covers images which realistically depict:

- An act which takes (or threatens) a person's life
- An act which results (or is likely to result) in a person's severe injury
- Rape or other non-consensual penetrative sexual activity
- Sexual activity involving (directly or indirectly) a human corpse
- An act which involves sexual activity between a person and an animal (or an animal carcass)

Again, the law covers images of staged acts so long as a reasonable person looking at the image would think it was real or shows harm, and applies whether or not the participants consented.

In 2019 the laws concerning extreme pornography were relaxed in the United Kingdom. The depiction of fetishes such as BDSM and humiliation is no longer likely to be prosecuted, provided the production is consensual and no harm is caused thereby, and the depiction does not promote criminality and is not aimed at minors.

== Crime and Policing Act 2026 ==
The Crime and Policing Act 2026 made illegal the possession and publication of pornography in the United Kingdom if it shows suffocation, strangulation, or sexual roleplay involving people pretending to be closely related or "where a reasonable person would think at least one person is, or is pretending to be, under 16." Publication carries a maximum penalty of five years' imprisonment (which could include uploading, posting or otherwise making the content available to someone online), possession of images depicting sexual activity involving a person pretending to be under 16 could face up to three years' imprisonment, and possession of images depicting strangulation, suffocation, or penetrative sexual activity between certain relatives could face up to two years' imprisonment. The ban took effect from 6 November 2026.

Senior editor at Reason, Elizabeth Nolan Brown, called it "absurd to throw people into prison for such content, whatever you think of such content yourself." Adult content creators, free speech advocates and experts have opposed the ban. Myles Jackman, an obscenity lawyer in the UK said of the ban, "I would encourage both content creators and consumers to underscore the risks of this law because to me, it genuinely seems like one of the greatest acts of suppression of free speech in global history."

== British Board of Film Classification ==
Hardcore material was not legalised until 2000, almost 30 years after the United States and the rest of Europe. Filmed material still has to be certified by the British Board of Film Classification in order to be legally supplied. This makes the UK's media one of the most regulated liberal democracies. Distribution of pornography, including written material, is also restricted by the Obscene Publications Acts.

== See also ==
- Censorship in the United Kingdom
- Pornography in the United Kingdom
