= Center for Healthy Sex =

Community therapy center in Los Angeles, California

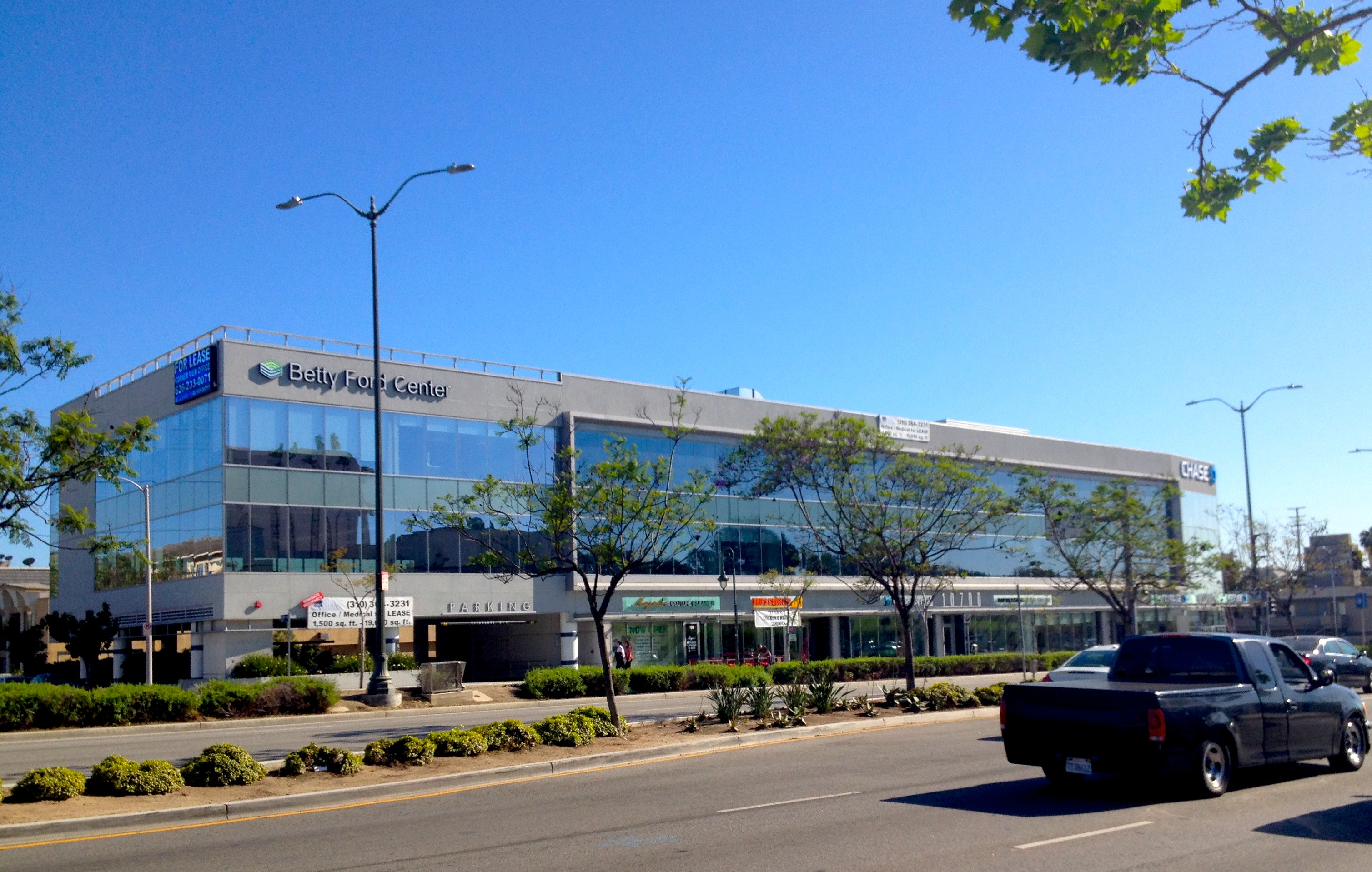
Center for Healthy Sex offices in West Los Angeles

Center for Healthy Sex is a community therapy center in Los Angeles that specializes in the treatment of sexual dysfunction, sexual anorexia, sex addiction, and love addiction. The Center is located on Santa Monica Boulevard near Overland Avenue bordering the neighborhoods of Century City and Westwood.

In 2011, Center for Healthy Sex partnered with Twentieth Century Fox Home Entertainment to produce a special screening of Shame at American Cinematheque followed by a panel of sex experts including Alexandra Katehakis, Ethlie Ann Vare and Chris Donaghue (host of Bad Sex) as well as sex addicts from Sex and Love Addicts Anonymous, Sex Addicts Anonymous and Sexual Compulsives Anonymous. Center for Healthy Sex also participated in a screening and panel discussion for the film Thanks For Sharing with the film's co-writer, Matt Winston and a free film screening of the movie Unlovable with writer/star Charlene deGuzman and director Suzi Yoonessi. From 2011 to 2016, Center for Healthy Sex announced the annual Best/Worst Sex List highlighting the highs and lows of sexual culture, published by Huffington Post and Psychology Today.

== History ==
Center for Healthy Sex was co-founded by Alexandra Katehakis and Douglas Evans in 2005. Their stated mission is to offer men, women, and couples a safe place to receive professional psychotherapy to resolve shame, guilt, deception, or other barriers to healthy eroticism.

Katehakis serves as the center's clinical director. She treats affect dysregulation, the result of in-depth studies of attachment theory and interpersonal neurobiology as a member of Allan Schore’s study group since 2006. Alex Katehakis is a licensed Marriage and Family Therapist, Certified Sex Addiction Therapist and Supervisor, Certified Sex Therapist and Supervisor, and trained practitioner of Eye Movement Desensitization and Reprocessing (EMDR) therapy. Katehakis became certified as a sex addiction therapist by Patrick Carnes and worked at the Sexual Recovery Institute for eight years where she served as clinical supervisor for two years before opening Center for Healthy Sex. She is the author of Erotic Intelligence: Igniting Hot, Healthy Sex While in Recovery from Sex Addiction, Sex Addiction as Affect Dysregulation: A Neurobiologically Informed Holistic Treatment, and Sexual Reflections: A Workbook for Designing and Celebrating Your Sexual Health Plan. She is also the co-author of Making Advances: A Comprehensive Guide for Treating Female Sex and Love Addicts and Mirror of Intimacy: Daily Reflections on Emotional and Erotic Intelligence.

Douglas Evans, the center's executive director, graduated from Ohio State University with a degree in psychology and marketing, and has served as a volunteer counselor at the Southern California Counseling Center, and studied spiritual psychology at the University of Santa Monica.

Center for Healthy Sex employs a team of professional counselors that include marriage and family therapists, certified sex addiction therapists, and certified sex therapists.

== Programs and services ==
Center for Healthy Sex develops and hosts a range of programs open to the public that provide educational opportunities for therapists, clients, and anyone interested in further developing relationship skills and sexual intimacy. These include:

- Free podcasts, lectures and interviews on a variety of topics including sex addiction, sex therapy, sexual anorexia, human sexuality, human sexual activity and intimacy.
- Free daily meditations: daily quotes, meditations and tasks received by email for people interested in developing emotional and sexual intimacy.
- Free CEU lecture series: The Center offers free monthly lectures with continuing education units for sex therapists and sex addiction therapists on a variety of sexuality topics.
- Free online tests: Internet Sex Addiction Test, Love Addiction Test, and Sex Addiction Test.
- Online classes: The center offers 12-week online classes including Facing The Shadow based on the book by Patrick Carnes, Facing Heartbreak based on the book by Carnes, Lee and Rodriguez, Facing Love Addiction based on the book by Pia Mellody, and Ready to Heal based on the book by Kelly McDaniel.

Center for Healthy Sex is a licensed continuing education provider with the California Board of Behavioral Sciences and a continuing education provider approved by American Association of Sexuality Educators, Counselors and Therapists. It also provides comprehensive social services including:

- Group Therapy: The Center offers weekly groups including Men’s Sex Addiction Treatment Group, Men's Porn Addiction Treatment Group, Betrayal Trauma Partner’s Group, and Women’s Intimacy Group.
- Individual Therapy: Psychotherapy with a trained sex therapist or sex addiction therapist to help alleviate a wide array of issues, both physical and emotional, including painful intercourse, erectile dysfunction, premature ejaculation, sexual addiction, lack of sexual desire, negative sexual attitudes due to psychological trauma, and stress and/or anxiety regarding sexual performance.
- Couples Sex Therapy: A team of trained sex therapists help couples to address problems with sexual arousal, genital functioning, lack of intimacy, sexual satisfaction, and differences in the desire for sex.
- Men's and Women's Love Addiction Online Workshop: A psychoeducational workshop for those who are looking to break free of problematic relationships and learn tools to develop their core sense of authentic emotional intimacy.
- Sex Addiction Treatment Training: A 15-hour training program over the course of two classes for those interested in treating sex addiction.
- Sex Therapy Training: A 15-hour training program over the course of two classes for those interested in sex therapy.

== See also ==
- Sex therapy
- IITAP
