= ClearStory =

British television production company

ClearStory Ltd is a British independent television production company headquartered in London. Founded in 2010 by the film-makers Russell Barnes and Molly Milton, it produces factual programming, often in the history and science genres, and has explored provocative social issues through documentary formats, sparking controversies.

The company's credits include Dawkins: Sex, Death & the Meaning of Life for Channel 4, Men of the Thames for London Live, Long Shadow for BBC2 and World War Two: 1945 & the Wheelchair President BBC Four.

In 2011, ClearStory produced Gypsy Blood, an award-winning observational documentary, directed by photographer Leo Maguire about gypsy fathers and sons for the True Stories strand on Channel 4. Broadcast in January 2012, the film won critical praise but also drew complaints from animal rights activists for its depiction of alleged animal cruelty perpetrated by some of the film's characters. In March 2012, Ofcom dropped these complaints, stating they did not raise issues that warranted investigation.

In 2013, ClearStory produced Sex Box, a one-hour formatted studio show broadcast on Channel 4 as part of its Real Sex season. In Sex Box, couples had sex in a specially constructed box in a TV studio, then emerged to talk about what happened and their sex lives more generally with agony aunt Mariella Frostrup and a panel of experts – Phillip Hodson, Tracey Cox and Dan Savage. The programme received mainly negative reviews. Its second series aired in 2016, bringing the show to a total of 11 episodes. Sex Box has been syndicated to several territories, including America where it was broadcast in 2015 on WE tv channel.

In 2016, Channel 5 broadcast Battlefield Recovery, ClearStory's series exploring the history of World War Two's Eastern Front. The series follows the work of authorised volunteers who excavate soldiers still left behind in the fields and forests of Latvia and Poland to bury them with honour in official cemeteries. The series previously sparked controversy amongst some archaeologists when it was launched by the National Geographic Channel in 2014 as 'Nazi War Diggers'. In 2016, archaeologists complained about the Channel 5 broadcast but Ofcom dismissed these complaints following broadcast of the series and stated: 'The series dealt effectively with potential audience concerns about the contributors' methods. It made clear that the specific practices adopted were undertaken within recognised protocols. Scenes that featured human remains were dealt with sensitively, and the contributors appeared visibly moved by their discoveries.'

In 2017, ClearStory produced a one-off documentary, Damien Hirst by Harry Hill, for Sky Arts' Passions strand. The film, an affectionate parody of an arts documentary presented by comedian Harry Hill, was broadcast to coincide with Hirst's controversial show at the Venice Biennale, Treasures of the Wreck of the Unbelievable.

ClearStory's Great Village Green Crusade starred Red Dwarf actor Robert Llewellyn in a quest to turn his Cotswolds village on to renewable energy. Promoted as a cross between The Archers and An Inconvenient Truth, the feature-length science film included sequences in Las Vegas, exploring the city's drive to use only solar power, which has been overshadowed by lawsuits with regulators and Nevada state utility companies.

Utopia: In Search of the Dream was ClearStory's three-part BBC Arts series, in which Professor Richard Clay of Newcastle University interrogated different notions of utopia – imagined, built or experienced – with a range of interviewees such as Norman Foster, Nichelle Nichols, Sid Meier and Frank Spotnitz, exploring how utopias spur creativity and reflect our deepest hopes and fears. The first episode featured a sequence at Wikimedia's spring 2017 conference in Berlin and interview with Wikimedia Foundation director Katherine Maher.

ClearStory worked in collaboration with the dance company Sadler's Wells in 2018 and 2020 to produce two series of DanceWorks for BBC4. The series profiled major dancers, including Dickson Mbi, Maria Pages and Sharon Eyal of L-E-V Company facing creative challenges at different moments in their careers. The episode about prima ballerina Zenaida Yanowsky, The Dying Swan, won the Grand Prix at 2019 Golden Prague festival.

In 2020, ClearStory's BBC4 series African Renaissance was broadcast to critical acclaim and shortlisted for RTS and Broadcast Awards. In the series, journalist Afua Hirsch goes on a cultural travelogue through Ethiopia, Senegal and Kenya, meeting artists and creatives including Aida Muluneh, Didier Awadi and Michael Soi.

Art That Made Us, ClearStory's eight-part history of creativity in the British Isles aired in May 2022 with a positive critical reception and shortlisting for awards including the Rose D'Or. The series featured encounters between artists, thinkers and actors of today and art and literature of the past. Contributors included Michael Sheen, Antony Gormley and Lubaina Himid among many others.

In 2022, ClearStory produced Jimmy Carr Destroys Art, a programme designed to break the taboo around destruction of art and explore in what circumstances that may be justified. The programme, presented by comedian Jimmy Carr, generated controversy even before broadcast

ClearStory's corporate work includes the short #Connect for Durex. A Webby and DMA awards nominee, the official version scored over 75 million hits worldwide.
