= David Reynolds (historian) =

British historian

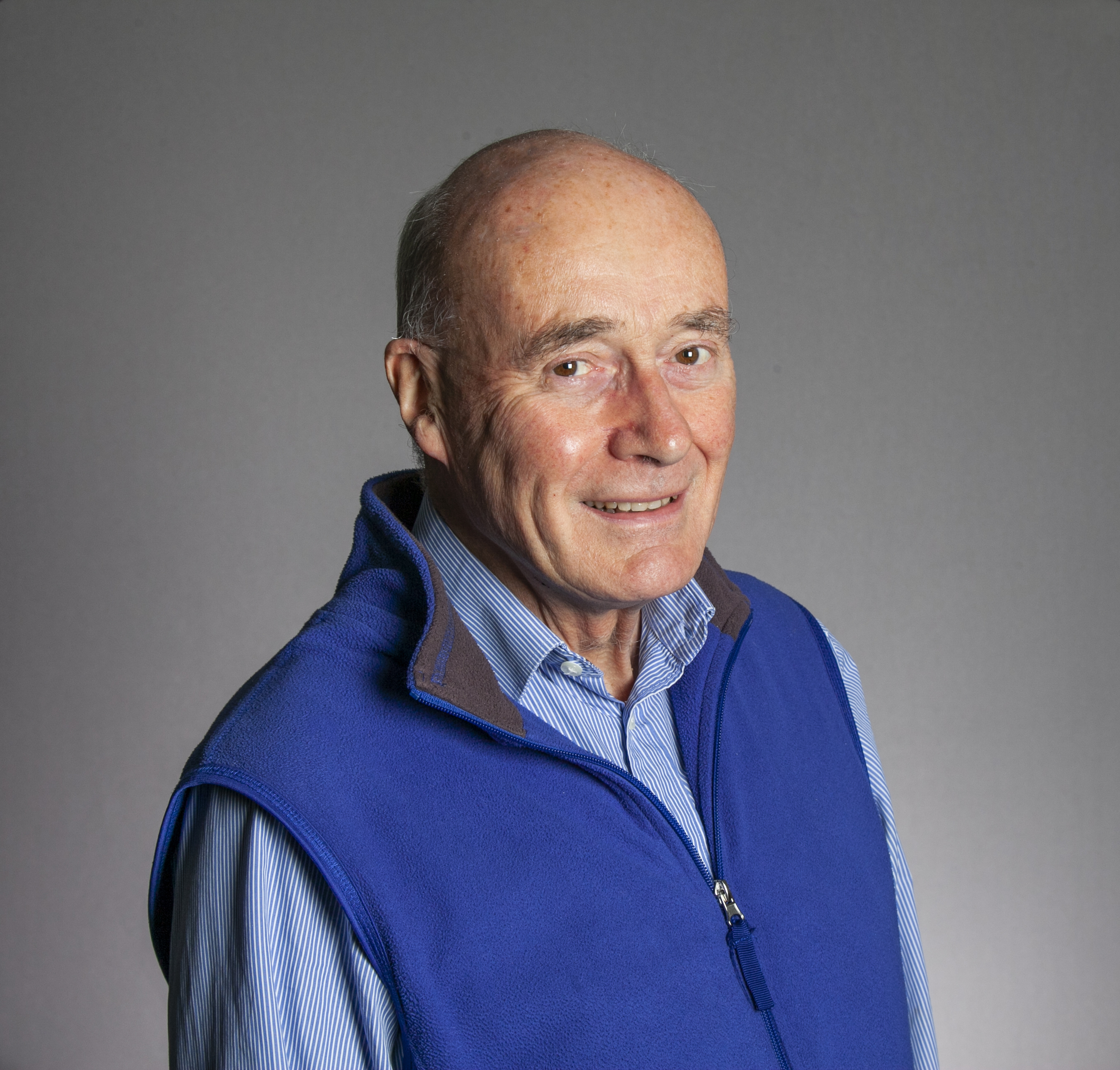
David Reynolds in 2022.

David Reynolds, FBA (born 17 February 1952) is a British historian. He is Emeritus Professor of International History at Cambridge University and a Fellow of Christ's College, Cambridge.

== Biography ==
Reynolds attended school at Dulwich College on a scholarship, and studied history at Gonville and Caius College, Cambridge (BA, PhD), and Harvard University (Chaote and Warren Fellowships). He has held visiting posts at Harvard, Nebraska and Oklahoma universities, as well as at Nihon University in Tokyo and Sciences Po in Paris.

Reynolds was awarded the Wolfson History Prize, 2005, and elected a Fellow of the British Academy in 2005. His research and writing specialise in the two world wars and the Cold War. He served as Chairman of the History Faculty at Cambridge in 2013-15 and retired from University teaching in 2019. In 2022, a number of his former PhD students presented him with a Festschrift published in the journal Diplomacy & Statecraft. He has served on academic advisory boards for the redevelopment of the Imperial War Museum First World War Galleries (2011-14) and Second World War Galleries (since 2016). In 2021, he succeeded Roger Knight as President of Cambridge University Cricket Club.

== Documentaries ==
Reynolds has made thirteen documentaries on 20th-century history for the BBC, most recently the three-part BBC Two series Long Shadow, based on his award-winning book about the legacies and memory of 1914–18 and a trilogy of films about the Big Three allies in the Second World War: World War Two: 1941 and the Man of Steel, World War Two: 1942 and Hitler's Soft Underbelly and World War Two: 1945 and the Wheelchair President. All these films have been directed by Russell Barnes.

Reynolds was also the writer and presenter of the award-winning ninety-part series America, Empire of Liberty, broadcast on BBC Radio 4.

== Personal life ==
Reynolds is married, with one son and three grandchildren.

== Awards and honours ==
- 2004 Wolfson History Prize, In Command of History
- 2005 Fellow of the British Academy
- 2014 Hessell-Tiltman Prize, The Long Shadow

== Books ==
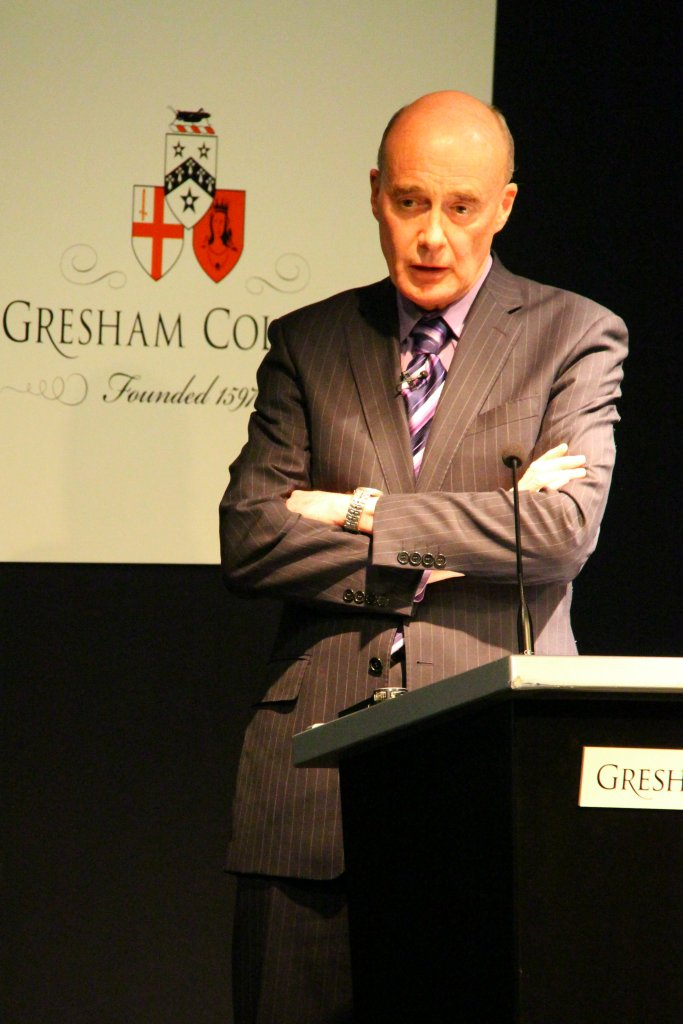
Reynolds delivering a lecture at Gresham College in 2014.

- 1981: The Creation of the Anglo-American Alliance, 1937–1941: a Study in Competitive Co-operation (1981) University of North Carolina Press ISBN 0-8078-1507-1 (Awarded the Bernath Prize by the Society for Historians of American Foreign Relations, 1982)
- 1988: An Ocean Apart: the Relationship between Britain and America in the 20th Century – co-author David Dimbleby. Hodder & Stoughton ISBN 0-340-40666-6 (Linked to BBC/PBS TV series.)
- 1991: Britannia Overruled: British Policy and World Power in the 20th Century. Longman ISBN 0-582-43725-3
- 1994: Allies at War: the Soviet, American and British Experience 1939–1945 (Franklin and Eleanor Roosevelt Institute Series on Diplomatic and Economic History). (Co-edited with Warren F. Kimball and A. O. Chubarian). Palgrave Macmillan ISBN 0-312-10259-3
- 1994: The Origins of the Cold War in Europe: International Perspectives (editor). Yale University Press ISBN 0-300-05892-6
- 1995: Rich Relations: the American Occupation of Britain, 1942–1945. Random House ISBN 0-517-16871-5 (Awarded the US Society for Military History's Distinguished Book Award, 1996)
- 2000: One World Divisible: a Global History since 1945.. Allen Lane ISBN 0-7139-9461-4
- 2001: From Munich to Pearl Harbor: Roosevelt's America and the Origins of the Second World War. Ivan R. Dee ISBN 1-56663-389-3
- 2004: In Command of History: Churchill Fighting and Writing the Second World War. Random House ISBN 0-679-45743-7 (Awarded the Wolfson History Prize, 2004)
- 2005: Christ's: a Cambridge College Over Five Centuries (editor). Macmillan ISBN 0-333-98988-0
- 2006: From World War to Cold War: Churchill, Roosevelt, and the International History of the 1940s. Oxford University Press ISBN 0-19-928411-3
- 2007: Summits: Six Meetings That Shaped the Twentieth Century. Allen Lane ISBN 0-7139-9917-9
- 2008: FDR's World: War, Peace, and Legacies. (Co-edited with David B. Woolner and Warren F. Kimball) Palgrave Macmillan ISBN 0-230-60938-4
- 2009: America, Empire of Liberty: A New History. David Reynolds ISBN 978-0-14-190856-4
- 2013: The Long Shadow: The Great War and the Twentieth Century. Simon & Schuster UK ISBN 978-0857206350; W. W. Norton, 2014 US ISBN 978-0-393-08863-2 (Awarded the Hessell-Tiltman Prize, 2014)
- 2016: Transcending the Cold War: Summits, Statecraft, and the Dissolution of Bipolarity in Europe, 1970–1990. (Co-edited with Kristina Spohr) Oxford University Press ISBN 978-0-19-872750-7
- 2018: The Kremlin Letters: Stalin's Wartime Correspondence with Churchill and Roosevelt, with Vladimir Pechatnov. Yale University Press ISBN 978-0-300-22682-9 (Awarded the Link-Kuehl Prize by the Society for Historians of American Foreign Relations, 2020)
- 2019: Island Stories: Britain and its History in the Age of Brexit HarperCollins ISBN 978-0-00-828231-8
- 2023: Mirrors of Greatness: Churchill and the Leaders Who Shaped Him HarperCollins ISBN 978-0-00-843991-0

== Broadcasting (as writer and presenter) ==
- 2004: Churchill's Forgotten Years – BBC Four/BBC Two
- 2004: The Improbable Mr Attlee – BBC Four
- 2008: Summits – three-part series: (1) Munich, 1938; (2) Vienna, 1961; (3) Geneva, 1985 – BBC Four
- 2008: Armistice – BBC2 (Grierson Award: Best Historical Documentary, runner-up)
- 2008–09: America, Empire of Liberty – BBC Radio 4 (90-part series, accompanying the writer's 2009 book) (Voice of the Listener & Viewer Award for the Best New Radio Programme of 2008; Sony Radio Academy Award, Nomination, 2009; Orwell Prize, Shortlist, 2010)
- 2010: Nixon in the Den – BBC Four
- 2011: World War Two: 1941 and the Man of Steel – BBC Four (Grierson Award: Best Historical Documentary, Nomination)
- 2012: World War Two: 1942 and Hitler's Soft Underbelly – BBC Four
- 2014: The Long Shadow – three-part series: (1) Remembering and Understanding; (2) Ballots and Bullets; (3) Us and Them – BBC Ywo
- 2015: World War Two: 1945 and the Wheelchair President – BBC Four
- 2016: Verdun: The Sacred Wound BBC Radio 4 (two-part series: (1) The Battle; (2) Loss and Legacy)
- 2017: Balfour's Promised Land BBC Radio 4 – on the centenary of the Balfour Declaration
- 2022: FDR's Four Freedoms BBC Radio 4 – Archive on Four, 2 December 2022, https://www.bbc.co.uk/programmes/m001fm6c
