= Sex Box =

British television series

- Starring: Mariella Frostrup (2013); Phillip Hodson (2013); Tracey Cox (2013); Dan Savage (2013); Steve Jones (2016–); Goedele Liekens (2016–)
- Country of origin: United Kingdom
- Original language: English
- No. of series: 2
- No. of episodes: 11

Production
- Producers: Clearstory; Russell Barnes; Molly Milton
- Running time: 44 minutes

Original release
- Network: Channel 4
- Release: 7 October 2013 – 2 May 2016

Related
- Sex Box (U.S. TV series)

Sex Box is a British television series. The first series was hosted by Mariella Frostrup. The series was produced by independent production company Clearstory and broadcast on Channel 4. The show's premise centres upon the idea that couples will be more open to sexually themed discussions after having performed the act itself. The show's hosts have the couple retire to a private "sex box" on stage, where they are to have sexual intercourse with one another.

Sex Box was released as part of Channel 4's "Campaign for Real Sex", which the channel described as "a series of programmes which aim to reclaim sex from porn". The programme provoked controversy and debate in both the British and international press. Some reviews of the programme were positive, praising the sincerity of the programme's aims. However, many critics and viewers panned the show, and ratings for the first episode showed that while 1.1 million viewers tuned into the show, this number dropped by 200,000 after the first 15 minutes.

Series 2 began broadcasting on 4 April 2016. It is presented by Goedele Liekens and Steve Jones.

== Synopsis ==
The show features couples that have agreed to come on to the show and have sex in the titular "sex box". During this time the hosts will discuss their relationship. After a certain amount of time the couple will emerge from the box and talk about sex and their relationship. The show's theory is that couples will be more likely to be closer after having sex and be more likely to be honest and open when answering questions about their own sex life and sex in general.

== Episodes ==
=== Series 1 ===
- Episode 1, airdate 7 October 2013, viewership 900,000
- Episode 2, airdate 8 October 2013
- Episode 3, airdate 9 October 2013
- Episode 4, airdate 10 October 2013
- Episode 5, airdate 11 October 2013
- Episode 6, airdate 14 October 2013
- Episode 7, airdate 15 October 2013

=== Series 2 ===
- Episode 1, airdate 4 April 2016
- Episode 2, airdate 11 April 2016
- Episode 3, airdate 18 April 2016
- Episode 4, airdate 2 May 2016

== Reception ==
TIME remarked that the show was "all pretty tame, polite, slightly awkward at times and, overall, just dull" and that the couples "weren’t so overtaken by sex endorphins that they actually revealed anything vivid or shocking." The Guardian and The Telegraph also panned the show overall, and The Telegraph's reviewer wrote that "Sex Box was one of the worst TV programmes I have seen in a long time. From concept to execution, it was a combination of gimmick, prurience, exploitation and dullness." Metro also commented on the show, noting that the show "left viewers in a state of awkwardness and confusion tonight, with many pondering over a series of unanswered sex questions following its debut." The Mirror poked fun at the show for having "a weird box with flashing multicoloured lights that looked like an Ikea-bought version of Doctor Who's TARDIS". They also criticized the show for spending more time on its heterosexual couples than on the disabled and homosexual pairings, a criticism shared by Gawker.

By contrast, Time Out praised "A surprisingly earnest, likeable and good-hearted affair", and a reviewer for Complex praised the show for its diversity and stated that they "actually learned a thing or two", which surprised them. According to The Times: "If you put aside your preconceptions, ignore the surrounding brouhaha and watch this programme with an open mind, it becomes difficult to criticise and impossible to condemn".

== In other countries ==
Sex Box is distributed internationally by DRG TV.

The show was broadcast in Australia on SBS Two.

In March 2014 WE tv announced that they were in the process of developing a North American version of the show and had ordered an hour-long pilot episode. The show first aired on WE tv in February 2015 and was hosted by relationship therapist Fran Walfish, sex therapist Dr. Chris Donaghue, Florida pastor Dr. Yvonne Capehart, and comedian Danielle Stewart. Nine episodes of the series were ordered but only five aired, as the show was cancelled in April 2015 due to poor reception.
