= America, Empire of Liberty =

Radio series and book by David Reynolds

America, Empire of Liberty is the title of a radio series and book by British historian David Reynolds about US history. The title is taken from Thomas Jefferson's speeches (he used the phrase "Empire of Liberty" at least twice).

== Radio series ==
America, Empire of Liberty
- Running time: 15 minutes
- Home station: BBC Radio 4
- Hosted by: David Reynolds
- Original release: 2008 – 2009
- No. of series: 3
- No. of episodes: 90
- Website: www.bbc.co.uk/radio4/america/

The radio series was broadcast in 90 15-minute segments over three series of 30 parts each. on BBC Radio 4.

Reynolds narrates, whilst actors read letters, diaries and other historical sources.

The radio series won the Voice of the Listener & Viewer Award for the Best New Radio Programme of 2008. It also received a Sony Radio Academy Award Nomination in 2009 and was shortlisted for the Orwell Prize, 2010)

== Book ==
America, Empire of Liberty: A New History
- Author: David Reynolds
- Language: English
- Subject: U.S. history
- Publisher: Allen Lane
- Pages: 671
- ISBN: 978-1-84614-056-3

America, Empire of Liberty: A New History is a book on the history of the United States by author David Reynolds published in the United Kingdom in January 2009 by Penguin and in the United States in October 2009.

=== Reception ===
Max Hastings reviewing the book for The Times said "Journalism takes over from history in the last pages of the book. But that is a quibble ... This is the best single-volume account of the world's greatest society for many years." The Guardian reviewed it as 'book of the week' and DD Guttenplan called it "a timely but flawed book" saying "on the topics I know a bit about, Reynolds is often unreliable. Finally, Reynolds is just cloth-eared when it comes to American culture."

In The Independent Frank McLynn said "readable, never dull, full of anecdotes, mini-biographies and arresting juxtapositions [...] but as a general overview of US history, Reynolds's book is chock-full of faults", The Daily Telegraph's Alan Marshall said "Reynolds mostly succeeds in incorporating unfamiliar detail from the archives of ordinary life without losing his narrative thread. He has an enthralling tale to tell and he relates it in plain lively terms. And on the whole he is right to trust the sheer wealth of the material, familiar as its broad outline is, to hold us in its power unadorned." The Financial Times' Edward Luce said "It is to Reynolds’ great credit that his book helps make sense not just of America but also of the Bushes. Now is a good time to read it." "Let us not mince words," observed historian Joseph Ellis in The National Interest. "In my judgment, this is the best one-volume history of the United States ever written."

=== Second edition ===
A second edition of the book, with the same title but the words "Revised and Updated" on the cover, was released on May 25, 2021. It covers events up to and including the COVID-19 pandemic.
