= Faith School Menace? =

2010 film

- Written by: Richard Dawkins
- Directed by: Molly Milton
- Country of origin: United Kingdom
- Original language: English

Production
- Producer: Russell Barnes

Original release
- Network: More4
- Release: 18 August 2010

Related
- The Genius of Charles Darwin

Faith School Menace? is a television documentary presented by Richard Dawkins which explores the effects of faith schools on the students in them and society in general by taking examples in particular from UK faith schools, with the stated aim "to explore the balance of rights between a parent's right to educate a child in their own faith, and the children's rights to determine their own beliefs and approach the world with a genuinely open mind".

At the time of broadcast, one third of British schools had some kind of religious affiliation. Dawkins was refused entry to Catholic and Jewish faith schools, but was allowed to film in a Muslim school, where children were taught what the theory of evolution was, but that it was not true.

It was first aired on More4 on 18 August 2010.
