= Russell Barnes =

British television producer and director

Russell Barnes (born 1968) is a British television producer and director, known primarily for documentaries about science and contemporary history. He was educated at Bedford Modern School and studied history at Christ's College, Cambridge.

Russell Barnes worked as a researcher on cult youth programmes A Stab in the Dark and The Word, and also Channel 4’s television review show, Right to Reply.

In 2002, he directed Empire, a revisionist account of British colonial history presented by the Harvard historian Niall Ferguson. A sequel about US power, American Colossus, followed in 2004.

In 2004 Russell Barnes produced Churchill's Forgotten Years, written and presented by the Cambridge University historian David Reynolds. Barnes and Reynolds went on to collaborate on a series of further feature-length history documentaries for the BBC, including The Improbable Mr Attlee, Summits and Armistice, which charted the final month of the First World War from the German perspective and received special commendation from the jury at the 2009 Grierson Awards ceremony. In 2011, they produced World War Two: 1941 and the Man of Steel, a new profile of Josef Stalin, which was shortlisted in the Best Historical Documentary category of the 2012 Grierson Awards. This was followed in 2012 by World War Two: 1942 and Hitler’s Soft Underbelly which argued that the war in the Mediterranean became a dark obsession for Winston Churchill, and in 2015, World War Two: 1945 and the Wheelchair President, examined the impact of Franklin Roosevelt's failing health and marriage on his war leadership. Long Shadow, which explored the legacy and meaning of the First World War as part of the BBC's centenary season of programming, was broadcast on BBC2 in 2014. The series, which explored the legacy and meaning of the First World War as part of the BBC's centenary season of programming, received widespread and favourable press coverage and reviews.

Russell Barnes started working with the evolutionary biologist Richard Dawkins in 2005, directing the series The Root of All Evil? and The Enemies of Reason, which attracted controversy for their robust advocacy of atheism and rationalist principles. Barnes and Dawkins' next series The Genius of Charles Darwin, marking the 150th anniversary of On the Origin of Species in 2008, won Best Documentary series at the 2009 Broadcast Awards.

Russell Barnes has produced several films that explore the history of communications technology including, in 2000, How the Victorians Wired the World and Hackers in Wonderland. In 2009 he was series producer of The Virtual Revolution, a BBC2 history of the World Wide Web presented by Aleks Krotoski. The series won the 2010 International Digital Emmy Award and the 2010 BAFTA New Media Award.

In 2010 Barnes founded the independent production company ClearStory Ltd with Molly Milton, where he has produced projects including Richard Dawkins series Sex, Death and the Meaning of Life, the award-winning observational documentary Gypsy Blood and the controversial studio format Sex Box for Channel 4. Barnes was featured in The Guardian in 2021 about producers’ experiences of making risky television like Sex Box.

In 2017, Russell Barnes directed the comedian Harry Hill in Passions: Damien Hirst by Harry Hill, an affectionate parody of an arts documentary about the conceptual artist Damien Hirst. The film was broadcast by Sky Arts in its Passions strand to coincide with Hirst's controversial Venice Biennale show Treasures from the Wreck of the Unbelievable. Russell Barnes also directed the well-received arts series Utopia: In Search of the Dream, in which semiotician Professor Richard Clay explored different visions of utopia with notable interviewees including Norman Foster, Sid Meier and Katherine Maher.

Richard Clay and Russell Barnes collaborated again in 2019 on the BBC4 documentary Viral: Art of the Meme, which explored meme culture on the internet and featured interviews with Tumblr meme librarian Amanda Brennan and Tom Walker (aka Jonathan Pie) among others.

Russell Barnes produced the eight part BBC2 series Art That Made Us, which was released to critical acclaim in April 2022 and shortlisted for several awards. The series explored how moments of historic crisis spurred creativity in the British Isles. Barnes directed the second episode and co-directed the third episode, which featured artists, actors and thinkers of today such as Simon Armitage, Sarah Maple, Chris Levine, Morfydd Clark, Phoebe Boswell and Shaun Leane encountering pivotal art of the past.

Russell Barnes is active in Directors UK, sitting on the organisation's distribution committee.
