= CSAT =

CSAT may refer to:

- Cebu School of Arts and Trades, former name of Cebu Technological University, Cebu, Philippines
- Civil Services Aptitude Test, in India, a preliminary stage of the Civil Services Examination which is conducted by the Union Public Service Commission for recruitment into government and law enforcement jobs.
- College Scholastic Ability Test, a standardised test in South Korea
- Supreme Council of National Defense (Romania) (Consiliul Suprem de Apărare a Ţării), an autonomous administrative authority in Romania
- Customer satisfaction measure or index (market research)
- Circuit satisfiability problem, a classic NP-complete problem in computer science
- Commonwealth Secretariat arbitral tribunal
- Certified Sex Addiction Therapist, a therapeutic accreditation granted by the International Institute for Trauma and Addiction Professionals
- Canton-Protocol Strategic Alliance Treaty, a faction in the 2013 video game ARMA 3
