= Graham Hughes =

British television presenter (born 1979)

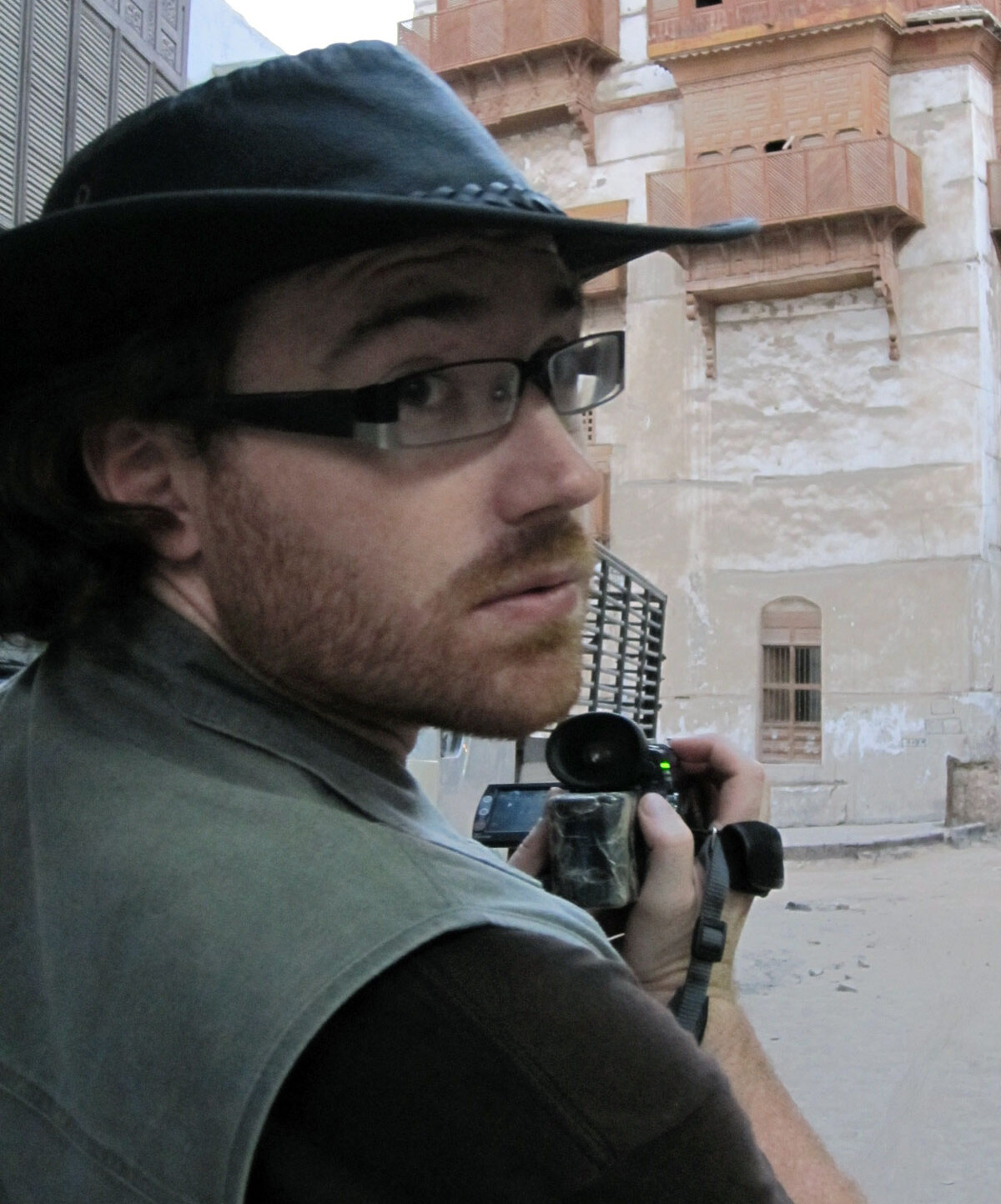
- Hughes in Jeddah, Saudi Arabia, June 2010
- Born: 28 February 1979 (age 47); Liverpool, England
- Known for: Visiting all 193 UN member states without flying

Graham David Hughes (born 28 February 1979) is the first person, according to Guinness World Records, to visit all 193 United Nations member states and several other territories across the world without flying. While on his journey he presented the television programme Graham's World on the National Geographic Adventure channel.

== Early life ==
Hughes was born in Liverpool in 1979. He attended Blackmoor Park School and the Liverpool Blue Coat School. He attended the University of Manchester. He moved to Orrell Park and set up a video production company firstly in Dale Street and then in the Baltic Triangle.

== The Odyssey Expedition ==
The Odyssey Expedition was a visit to all of the 193 UN member states. For the United Kingdom, Hughes visited all of the four constituent countries that make up the kingdom and counted the UN member state as four separate countries. Hughes also visited the non-member state of Vatican City, as well as the partially recognised non-member states of Palestine, Western Sahara, Kosovo, and Taiwan, for a total of 201 "countries" without flying. He noted people wonder how he got to countries like North Korea, Iraq and Afghanistan, but claims that "they were the easy ones".

Before embarking on the journey, Hughes contacted Guinness World Records to agree to the rules of his journey. The rules were: no flying as part of the journey, no private taxis over long distances (shared "bush" taxis were okay), no hitch-hiking, Hughes could not drive a vehicle or ride a motorbike as part of the journey (Guinness World Records does not permit people to "race" on public roads in private vehicles in order to set or break records), he must set foot on dry land (sailing into territorial waters did not count) and no travelling to far-flung territories and counting them as a visit to the motherland. Private transport was permitted over short distances (such as taking a private taxi across town), private transport was also permitted over water and he was allowed to take a break from the journey for personal reasons so long as he did not fly as part of the journey and he returned to the exact spot from which he left, something he did twice on his journey. It was agreed that the clock would not stop.

Events of the trip included imprisonment in the Republic of the Congo, getting caught sneaking into Russia, and running the blockade into Cuba. He was arrested in Estonia and Cameroon, then he spent jail time in Congo-Brazzaville and Cape Verde.

Guinness World Records were reportedly unhappy with his entry into Russia as it was the only country he entered without passing an official border post. In January 2013 Hughes returned to Russia, this time with a visa.

While on The Odyssey Expedition, Hughes helped raise funds and awareness for the charity WaterAid.

=== World records ===
Hughes set a new Guinness World Record by visiting "133 countries in one year by scheduled ground transport" during the first year of his four-year journey.

In February 2014, it was announced that Guinness World Records had confirmed Hughes's Odyssey Expedition was "The fastest time to visit all countries by public surface transport" (4 years and 31 days) after an extraordinarily long verification process. Marco Frigatti, Head of Records at Guinness World Records was quoted as saying "I can't remember a more absorbing record to verify in recent years."

=== Television shows and filmmaking ===
Hughes's video log of the first year of his expedition was made into an eight-part television series called Graham's World or Lonely Planet's The Odyssey. It was commissioned by the National Geographic Adventure channel, produced by Lonely Planet and distributed by BBC Worldwide.

=== Travel writing ===
Hughes's debut travel memoir, "Man of the World: Book One of The Odyssey Expedition", an account of the first year of his journey to every country without flying, was published by ATBOSH Media in October 2017.

=== YouTube work ===
Graham has been active on YouTube since Sep 12, 2006 and in the summer of 2013, Hughes's "One Second Every Country" YouTube video went viral, amassing almost one million views in just a few weeks, which led to appearances on BBC News and CBS This Morning as well as articles about his travels on Buzzfeed and Esquire.

== Post travel activities ==
=== SOS Island ===
On 12 December 2013, Hughes was declared the winner of SOS Island, a Survivor-like show featuring Les Stroud which relied on social media to promote Samsung products on a desert island setting. The prize was $100,000 towards a future island adventure of his choice. He chose to buy an island in Bocas Del Toro, Panama, from fellow British adventurer Ian Usher. Hughes renamed it "Jinja Island" and lived there off-grid for the best part of three years.

=== Political activism ===
In the wake of the Brexit referendum, Hughes wrote to his local Labour Party MP, Stephen Twigg, threatening to stand against him in an upcoming election if he voted with the Conservative Party to activate Article 50 without any protection for EU citizens living in the UK or British citizens living in the EU (against the wishes of a majority of his constituents). When Theresa May called a snap election in April 2017, Hughes, true to his word, returned to the UK to run against Twigg as an independent candidate. He received 0.7% of the votes, subsequently losing his deposit having not met the 5% threshold.

Since then, Hughes has been a vocal advocate of remaining in the European Union, leading and emceeing the "People's March For Europe" in September 2017. He stood as a candidate for the Liberal Democrats in the 2018 local government elections for his home ward of Knotty Ash, Liverpool and came third with just over 6% of the vote.
