= The Sex Inspectors =

Television series

The Sex Inspectors was a late night UK TV show that focuses on sex therapy for couples facing difficulties with their relationship. The show, presented by Tracey Cox and Michael Alvear, aids couples by suggesting different ways to spice up their relationships and sex lives. The show aired at 11pm on Channel 4, and each series usually consisted of 3 to 4 episodes, with the series finale being a special episode devoted to revisiting the couples featured on the series. Two subsequent series aired in 2005 and 2007. On the first visit, heat-sensitive cameras and CCTVs are installed throughout the house, allowing Tracey and Michael to monitor the couples' lives. After a few days of monitoring, the presenters then go back to the couples to tell them what they are doing wrong and what needs to be improved. British production company, Talkback produced the show

== Format ==
Despite the show's 11 pm slot, the show's content had to adhere to Ofcom guidelines. Therefore, the show did not show any penetration and the show depicted graphic acts such as fellatio using heat-sensitive cameras.

== Reception and criticism ==
Channel-4 released figures claiming that the show drew 1.9 million viewers, double the usual number of viewers for that particular time slot.

Leading sex therapists from the U.K. criticised the show, saying that it could cause viewers psychological damage. Much of their criticism centred around Tracey Cox the broadcaster and writer who acted as an advisor on The Sex Inspectors with Dr Petra Boynton from the University College London, claiming that Cox was dabbling in complex areas which "should be left to the experts". While British psychologist Phillip Hodson expressed concern that the show did not accurately represent what counts as normal sex.

The show's presenters adopted an authoritative tone and used terminology akin to that of professional sexual therapists to validate their supposed expertise. The presenter's matter of fact style led some academics to label the show as dangerously misleading.
