= Michael Alvear =

American author and media personality

Ernest Michael Alvear
- Occupation: Author Columnist Blogger Media Personality

Ernest Michael Alvear is an American author, columnist, blogger and media personality. Alvear co-hosted the international TV series The Sex Inspectors.

== Television ==
Alvear co-hosted the television show The Sex Inspectors with British author and TV personality Tracey Cox. The show aired between 2004 and 2006 on Great Britain's Channel 4 and was subsequently syndicated internationally to twelve markets including the US (HBO), Sweden, Norway, Finland, Iceland, Italy, Germany and South Africa. The show was the first to put cameras in the bedroom of couples experiencing sexual problems; the hosts would point out what they were doing wrong, assign homework and come back for re-visits to see if the couples' sex lives had improved.

Between 2004 and 2009, Alvear became a regular on the American talk show circuit, appearing on Today, The Tyra Banks Show and The Greg Behrendt Show.

== Books ==
- How To Top Like A Porn Star 2nd edition (Woodpecker Media 2020). ISBN 979-8692724441
- How To Bottom Like A Porn Star 2nd edition (Woodpecker Media 2020). ISBN 979-8692710529
- From Text To Sex. How To Text Your Way to a Date or a Hookup (Woodpecker Media 2014). ISBN 978-0-9891397-2-4
- Not Tonight Dear, I Feel Fat: How To Stop Worrying About Your Body & Have Great Sex (Sourcebooks Casablanca 2013). ISBN 1-4022-7255-3
- The Sexhalation Method. (Woodpecker Media, 2012). ISBN 978-0-9849161-8-4
- Meet Hotter Gay Guys (Woodpecker Media, 2010). ISBN 978-0-9849161-3-9
- Sex Inspectors Master Class: How To Have An Amazing Sex Life (Michael Joseph/Penguin 2005) ISBN 0-718-14851-7
- Alexander The Fabulous: The Man Who Brought The World To His Knees (Alyson, 2004) ISBN 1-55583-897-9
- Men Are Pigs But We Love Bacon (Kensington, 2003) ISBN 0-7582-0285-7

== Columns ==
- Need Wood? Tips For Getting Timber (nationally syndicated, 2002– )
- The Sexorcist, Creative Loafing Atlanta, 2009–11
- Manhunt's Cruise Director, 2006–08
