= Guinness World Records Smashed =

British television show

- Genre: Family Entertainment
- Presented by: Ben Shephard and Fearne Cotton (Pilot); Steve Jones and Konnie Huq (Series)
- Country of origin: United Kingdom
- Original language: English
- No. of series: 1
- No. of episodes: 12 (inc. 1 pilot)

Production
- Executive producer: Laura Mansfield
- Producers: Marc Bassett; Tom Richardson; Debbie Nugent
- Running time: 60 mins (inc. adverts)

Original release
- Network: Sky1
- Release: 23 November 2008 – 22 December 2009

Guinness World Records Smashed is a British television show for Sky1, that features record attempts, celebrity guests and death-defying stunts. A one-off pilot episode was transmitted on 23 November 2008, and a full 10-part series was broadcast on Sky1 from 19 April to 21 June 2009. The show was produced by British independent production company, Outline Productions with Guinness World Records.

== Filming ==
The pilot show was recorded in October 2008 at Teddington Studios and around London and invited people to partake in the filming to attempt to break existing world records.

On the back of the November 2008 one-off programme, Sky1 ordered a 10-part series. The studio format invited members of the public to try to set new world records in everything from leaping through burning hoops to somersaulting over cars. Celebrity guests, the audience, and the presenters also got involved with the record-breaking attempts. The series started airing on Sky1 and Sky1 HD on Sunday 19 April 2009. Filmed from February 2009, the studio show has been filmed at Pinewood Studios.

== Presenters ==
The pilot was transmitted in winter 2008. Fearne Cotton and Ben Shephard took part in several of the programme's record-attempt segments.

Konnie Huq and Steve Jones presented the series which first aired on 19 April 2009.

The record attempts were commentated on by Peter Dickson.

== Official adjudicator ==
Marco Frigatti is the Director of the global records management team for Guinness World Records and the chief adjudicator on the show.
