= Anne Hooper =

British sex therapist

- Born: 28 March 1941 (age 85); Harrow, Middlesex, England
- Occupations: Author, counsellor, journalist, broadcaster
- Years active: 1959–2010
- Children: 3
- Relatives: Phillip Hodson (Partner); Barnaby Levy (son); Joel Levy (son); Alex Hooper-Hodson (son)

Anne Hooper (born 1941) is a British sex therapist and author, who pioneered therapy groups for women with sex problems in the 1970s and 1980s and who wrote UK newspaper columns on the subject of human sexuality in the 1990s.

== Books ==
Since beginning a career as an author in the late 1970s she has written over 40 titles on the subject of sex therapy and sexual enhancement. These include The Ultimate Sex Guide and 21st Century Kama Sutra.

Her book Hot, Hot, Hot: The Body Electric has been described as “a seminal work” and has been in print for over 30 years while Divorce and Your Children was the first UK based book on the subject and has also been in print for over 30 years. She is author of the popular psychology book Adler for Beginners and an innovative work on the links between evolutionary psychology and sexual function in Sex: the Manual aka How Was It For You?

== Counseling ==
Hooper is a marital counselor, a sex therapist (BASRT). She founded the Women's Sexuality Workshop in the late 1970s, is a UK listed psychotherapist, a former council member of the Adlerian Society for Individual Psychology of Great Britain, and founding editor of the Adlerian Yearbook

== Journalism and radio ==
Hooper was a regular columnist on the Daily Mail, introducing sexual subject matter to its readers in the early 1990s and also had columns in Cosmopolitan, First Magazine, Best, and Bella. As a reforming feminist, she ensured that her writing was non-sexist at a time when others had not yet adapted their attitudes. She was a long-term radio presenter of the Counselling Programme on LBC in London and the first agony aunt for the first national cable television station in the UK (Wire TV). Currently she is consultant to Amora – the Academy of Sex and Relationships.

She has been a trustee for the Post Abortion Counselling Service (PACS) a regional committee member of the Family Planning Association and is presently assisting Ataxia UK.

== Film work ==
Hooper is the founder of the Tetbury Film Society and now works with the British Federation of Film Societies – South West to further film viewing in remote regions of South West England.
