= Transmission (TV programme) =

- Genre: Music
- Presented by: Steve Jones and Lauren Laverne
- Starring: Various artists
- Country of origin: United Kingdom
- Original language: English
- No. of seasons: 4

Production
- Production location: Varies
- Running time: 60 minutes

Original release
- Network: Channel 4

Transmission (also known for sponsorship reasons as Transmission with T-Mobile) is a British television programme broadcast on Channel 4, offering live performances and interviews of famous music artists, that ran for three series between 2006 and 2007. It was usually shown late at night on a Friday as part of the 4music strand on Channel 4.

The programme was produced by At It Productions and sponsored by mobile phone network T-Mobile. The first series aired in 2006 and came back for a second series in early 2007, then returned for a third series at the end of 2007. A fourth series was confirmed in 2008.

The programme was presented by T4 presenter Steve Jones and former XFM presenter Lauren Laverne.
