= Hackers in Wonderland =

- Directed by: Russell Barnes
- Produced by: Russell Barnes
- Starring: ColdFire; Cyber Junkie; Ricardo Dominguez; Carmin Karasic; tommEE pickles
- Narrated by: Joe Duttine
- Music by: Rephlex Records
- Production company: World of Wonder
- Distributed by: Channel 4
- Release date: 2000
- Running time: 47 minutes
- Country: United Kingdom
- Language: English

Hackers in Wonderland is a 2000 documentary film, produced and directed by Russell Barnes, about hackers in the United Kingdom. The documentary contains interviews with the hackers, revealing what drives them to hack, and their opinions about hacktivism.
