= Gypsy Blood =

2012 British documentary film

- DVD cover
- Directed by: Leo Maguire
- Theme music composer: Jack Ketch

Production
- Producers: Rob Wilkins; Russell Barnes; Molly Milton
- Editor: Joby Gee
- Running time: 72 minutes

Original release
- Release: 19 January 2012

Gypsy Blood is a British feature-length observational documentary which examines the fighting culture that Romani fathers hand on to their sons. It was filmed over two years by the photographer Leo Maguire and produced by the production company ClearStory.

== Subject ==
Its main subjects are Hughie Doherty, who becomes embroiled in a fight to defend his family's name, and his young son Francie, who is portrayed living between two worlds, shown learning to read at primary school while sparring and hunting at the travellers' campsite. The film also follows the story of Fred Butcher, a Romany who nearly dies during a machete attack after a day of drinking in the pub turns to violence.

== Reception ==
Transmitted on 19 January 2012, Gypsy Blood launched 2012's season of the True Stories documentary strand on Channel 4 and was the first True Stories to premiere on the main channel, rather than the digital channel More4. It attracted more than double the average audience for Channel 4's 10pm slot - 2.01 million (13.1% share) between 10pm and 11.35pm and an additional 280,800 watched on C4+1.

== Controversy ==
The film attracted critical praise from newspapers but also drew 500 complaints to Ofcom, including a complaint from the RSPCA, about scenes of alleged animal cruelty perpetrated by some of the film's characters. In March 2012 Ofcom dropped these complaints, stating they did not raise issues that warranted investigation.

== Awards ==
Gypsy Blood was shortlisted for the Rockies awards at the 2012 Banff World Media Festival, in the Social and Humanitarian documentaries category. The film was shortlisted in the Best Newcomer category of the 2012 Grierson Awards. Leo Maguire was shortlisted for Cinematography on Gypsy Blood at the 2012 Bafta Craft Awards. Gypsy Blood was showcased at the 2012 Sheffield documentary festival.
