= Sex Box (American TV series) =

American television show

- Genre: Reality
- Based on: Sex Box (British TV series)
- Country of origin: United States
- Original language: English
- No. of seasons: 1
- No. of episodes: 5, 4 unaired (9 total)

Production
- Running time: 42 minutes

Original release
- Network: WE tv
- Release: February 27, 2015 – April 2015

Sex Box is an American television show that aired on WE tv from February to April 2015. The show is a remake of the British series by the same name and was hosted by Fran Walfish, a relationship therapist, and also starred sex therapist Dr. Chris Donaghue, and comedian Danielle Stewart, who provided backstage commentary. WE tv cancelled the series in April 2015 due to poor ratings and only five of the first season's nine episodes were aired. WE tv has expressed interest in bringing the show back in a reformatted version.

== Synopsis ==
Several couples are brought into the studio, some of whom are experiencing relationship problems. The couple will enter a sound-proofed box on the stage, where they will have sexual intercourse. During this time the show's hosts will comment on sex, the couple, and the chances that the couple's relationship will survive. After a certain amount of time the couple exits the box and rejoins the hosts on stage, where they answer questions about themselves and their sex life, based on the theory that the couple will be more likely to be more open and honest in their answers after having intercourse.

== Production ==
WE tv first announced plans to create a pilot episode for a North American version of Sex Box in March 2014 and in August of the same year, stated that they had ordered a nine-episode season for the series. WE tv's President Mark Juris commented on the show's concept, which he found "one of the most unique and compelling show concepts we’ve ever seen". The Daily Beast has criticized the show's concept, stating "Sex Box, with its ridiculous guinea pigs screwing conceit, will only augment our cultural hang-ups about sex. Listening to a sex therapist, a relationship psychotherapist, and a pastor do their best American Idol impressions, break down the myriad problems couples are having during the act, will only make people more apprehensive when it comes to having sex. And what business does a pastor have lecturing people about his or her sexual performance? Religion is one of the driving forces behind this country’s prudishness to begin with."

== Reception ==
The Washington Post reviewed an early episode of the show, writing "This show is therapeutic in so many ways. First, because the experts encourage the couple to talk to each other about their sexual problems, and that can’t be bad, right? And second, because the revelation that a 7.9 (the equivalent of a C-plus) is an acceptable sex grade is great news for sexual underachievers everywhere!"

=== Criticism ===
Sex Box was heavily criticized by the Parents Television Council, who stated that the show was "an affront to families, toxic to advertisers, and a clear demonstration of a badly-broken business model that forces every cable/satellite subscriber to pay for unwanted and unwatched cable networks"
