= Steve Jones (Welsh presenter) =

Welsh television presenter

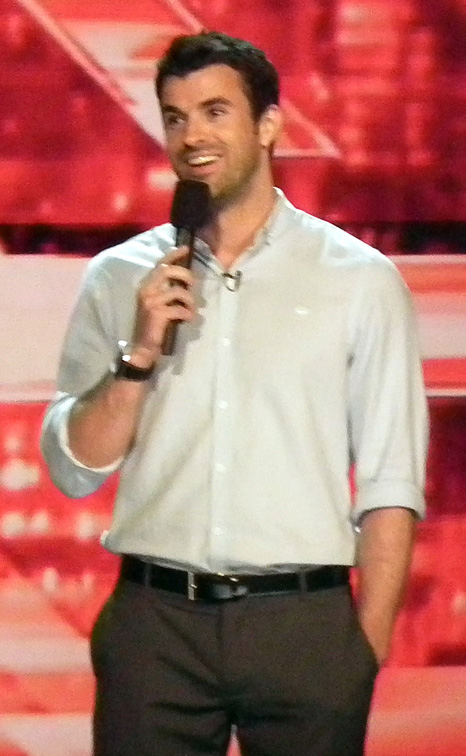
- Jones presenting The X Factor USA in June 2011
- Born: Stephen Ashton Jones; 16 March 1977 (age 49); Tylorstown, Wales
- Occupations: Television presenter, actor, model
- Years active: 2001–present
- Employer: Channel 4
- Known for: T4 (2003–2010); Let's Dance for Comic/Sport Relief (2009–2013); The X Factor USA (2011); Formula One (2016–); Sex Box (2016); This Morning (2023–)
- Spouse: Phylicia Jackson (m. 2014)

Stephen Ashton Jones (born 16 March 1977) is a Welsh television presenter from Tylorstown, Wales, who currently leads the presenting team on Channel 4 F1. He presented Channel 4's teen schedule T4 from 2003 to 2010. In the United States, he hosted the first series of The X Factor USA.

== Early life ==
Jones was born in Tylorstown, and currently resides in London.

== Career ==
After starting his career as a model for Esquire, Jones moved into presenting. His first presenting role was at The Big Breakfast with their Find Me A Weather Presenter competition. However he didn't make it into the final five. He later went on to front such programmes as The Pop Factory Awards with Liz Fuller and 99 Things To Do Before You Die. He then became a regular feature on Channel 4's weekend entertainment programme T4. In 2006, he worked on Transmission with T-Mobile with XFM DJ Lauren Laverne.

In February 2009, Jones made his BBC One debut hosting Let's Dance for Comic Relief with Claudia Winkleman, who was later replaced with Alex Jones. In early 2009, he presented Sky One's Guinness World Records Smashed with Konnie Huq. The same year, Jones began presenting the BBC TV quizshow As Seen on TV. He also presented 101 Ways to Leave a Gameshow for the channel, which aired in July 2010. In August 2009 and September 2013, he sat in for Janice Long on BBC Radio 2.

Jones has also done some acting. He had a small part in the film Angus, Thongs and Perfect Snogging and a minor role as himself in two episodes of the TV series Plus One. In 2010, he had a small role in the film It's a Wonderful Afterlife.

Jones designed and modelled clothing for Shop Direct Group's in-house brand 'Good Souls' for their 2010 Summer/Autumn ranges.

On 22 October 2010, it was announced Jones would leave T4 after seven years as a presenter. His last show for the strand was T4 Stars of 2010 on 21 November 2010. In 2010, Jones presented new game show, Drop Zone, on BBC One, in which eight teams faced a series of physical and mental challenges in six of the world's most exciting locations.

It was originally announced in May 2011 that Jones would co-host The X Factor USA with Nicole Scherzinger. However, Scherzinger was later promoted to the empty judge slot vacated by Cheryl Cole, and Jones was slated to present the show solo. In between filming the X Factor USA season one in Los Angeles, Jones appeared as a guest on The Ellen DeGeneres Show, where he talked about being a model, life in Los Angeles and working on The X Factor USA. In December 2011, Jones presented A Night with Beyoncé, a live music special on ITV.

In January 2012, Jones announced that he had been dropped as presenter of The X Factor USA. After much speculation, the show's creator Simon Cowell stated that many changes would be made to the show for the second season. Season one judges Paula Abdul and Nicole Scherzinger were also dropped from the show. In February 2012, Jones hosted Let's Dance for Sport Relief for the BBC in 2012 for the fourth series of the fundraising show. Jones said in a statement "The BBC, Let's Dance, and Alex Jones...three of my favourite things. I couldn't ask for a better show to come home to... I can't wait!".

In 2014, Jones presented the BBC Three reality show Hair. The programme was renewed for a second series in 2015, moving to BBC Two. For the second series, Jones was replaced by comedian Katherine Ryan. In 2014, Jones co-presented two series of the Channel 4 cookery show Weekend Kitchen with Waitrose with Lisa Snowdon, which aired every Saturday morning. He also appeared on the panel show Would I Lie to You? that year, in which he revealed that he once saved rapper P. Diddy from drowning at St Tropez in France. In 2015, he presented Young, Free & Single: Live on E4.

In 2016, Jones began presenting My Kitchen Rules: UK, a daytime cooking game show for Channel 4. On 29 January 2016, it was announced that he would join Goedele Liekens as co-host for Channel 4 new series, Sex Box. It began on 4 April 2016. In March 2016, Jones was announced as the lead anchor of the Formula One coverage on Channel 4. He presents live races and highlight shows. In 2017, he co-presented Animal Rescue Live: Supervet Special for Channel 4 with Noel Fitzpatrick.

Jones presented the On the Marbles F1 podcast with co-hosts Mark Webber and David Coulthard.

In August 2023, Jones became a guest presenter on the ITV daytime show This Morning alongside Josie Gibson.

== Personal life ==
Steve Jones was previously in a relationship with fellow Welsh presenter Alex Jones between 1999 and 2002.

Jones has been married to his wife Phylicia Jackson since 2014.

== Filmography ==
Television roles
| Year | Title | Channel | Role | Notes |
|---|---|---|---|---|
| 2000 | Big Breakfast Find Me A Weather Presenter final | Channel 4 | Contestant | didn't win final |
| 2002–2003 | The Pop Factory Awards | ITV Wales | Co-presenter | |
| 2003 | 99 Things to Do Before You Die | Five | | |
| 2003–2010 | T4 | Channel 4 | Co-presenter | |
| 2006–2007 | Transmission | Channel 4 | Co-presenter | 3 series |
| 2008 | When Women Rule the World | Channel 4 | Presenter | 1 series |
| 2009–2013 | Let's Dance for Comic/Sport Relief | BBC One | Co-presenter | 5 series |
| 2009 | Guinness World Records Smashed | Sky One | Co-presenter | 1 series |
| 2009 | As Seen on TV | BBC One | Presenter | 1 series |
| 2010 | 101 Ways to Leave a Gameshow | BBC One | Presenter | 1 series |
| 2010 | Drop Zone | BBC One | Presenter | 1 series |
| 2011 | The X Factor USA | Fox | Presenter | Season 1 |
| 2011 | A Night with Beyoncé | ITV | Presenter | One-off special |
| 2014 | Hair | BBC Three | Presenter | 1 series |
| 2014 | Weekend Kitchen with Waitrose | Channel 4 | Co-presenter | 2 series |
| 2015 | Young, Free & Single: Live | E4 | Presenter | 1 series |
| 2016– | Channel 4 F1 | Channel 4 | Presenter | |
| 2016 | Guy Martin's Wall of Death: Live | Channel 4 | Presenter | One-off special |
| 2016 | Sex Box | Channel 4 | Co-presenter | 1 series |
| 2017 | Animal Rescue Live: Supervet Special | Channel 4 | Co-presenter | 1 series |
| 2022 | Perfect House, Secret Location | Channel 4 | Presenter | 1 series |
| 2023 | This Morning | ITV | Guest Host | 1 episode |

Film roles
| Year | Title | Role |
|---|---|---|
| 2008 | Angus, Thongs and Perfect Snogging | Jem |
| 2010 | It's a Wonderful Afterlife | Reporter |
| 2011 | Chalet Girl | Reporter |
