= Wendy Wright =

American social conservatism policy strategist

Wendy Wright is an American social conservatism policy strategist. From 2006 to 2013 she was the president and chief executive officer of Concerned Women for America, a Christian conservative political action committee active in the United States. She joined the organization in 1999 and served as its executive vice president before being named president on January 30, 2006. Wright was listed as one of "The 100 Most Powerful Women of Washington" in 2006 by Washingtonian magazine. Wright is a frequent spokesperson for conservative causes, including anti-abortion and international issues. Between 2011 and 2016, she also served as the vice president for government relations and communications at the Center for Family and Human Rights (C-Fam).

She is also the CEO and President of Christian Freedom International, a human rights organization that works against global persecution of Christians.

== Pop culture ==
In 2008 Wright was interviewed by Evolutionary Biologist Richard Dawkins for his programme The Genius of Charles Darwin in the episode titled "God Strikes Back", where she argues against evolution, dismissing the prevailing interpretation of scientific evidence visibly presented to us in the natural world. Dawkins wrote of the exchange in his 2009 book The Greatest Show on Earth: The Evidence for Evolution.
