= Jocelyn Hay =

British journalist and broadcasting campaigner (1927–2014)

- Born: 30 July 1927; Swansea, Wales
- Died: 21 January 2014 (aged 86); Gravesend, England
- Occupations: Journalist and broadcasting campaigner
- Known for: Founder of the Voice of the Listener & Viewer

Jocelyn Hay, CBE (30 July 1927 – 21 January 2014) was a British journalist and broadcasting campaigner, founder of the Voice of the Listener & Viewer in 1983. In 2008, The Daily Telegraph described Hay as "possibly the best lobbyist in the whole UK". The Scotsman noted that she was once called the "Florence Nightingale of Public Service Broadcasting".

== Early life ==
Jocelyn Hay grew up in Swansea, where her father was an accountant. Her formal schooling was cut short in 1940, when she was 13 years old, as she was evacuated to Australia to lodge with an aunt. In 1945 she rejoined her parents in Trieste. There she met and married a Scottish army officer.

== Career ==
Hay began her career as a freelance journalist, broadcaster, and public relations writer, most notably for Girl Guides. In 1983 she founded Voice of the Listener (the name was lengthened to Voice of the Listener & Viewer in 1991) as a consumer group to promote public service broadcasting. Voice of the Listener was seen as a "voice for radio listeners" at a time when the managing director of BBC Radio 4, Richard Francis, was pushing to turn the station into a news-only channel. Hay also saw the need for a platform that would address a "full range of policy issues", unlike the more narrowly focused National Viewers' and Listeners' Association (NVLA, now Mediawatch-uk), set up by Mary Whitehouse in 1965.

Besides on-air programming, Hay chaired annual conferences in Scotland which encouraged public interaction and debate with "broadcasters, regulators, politicians, journalists and academics".

By the time Hay relinquished her role as chairman of Voice of the Listener & Viewer to become its president in 2008, Voice of the Listener & Viewer numbered 1500 members.

== Honours and awards ==
In 1999 Hay was appointed MBE, and also received the Elizabeth R Award from the Commonwealth Broadcasting Association. In 2005, she was promoted to CBE. In 2007, she received a European Woman of Achievement Award.

== Personal life ==
Hay was married to Bill, a former army officer (who predeceased her); they had two daughters.
