= Gay Sex Ed =

WOW Presents Plus series

- Starring: Kameron Michaels; Vanessa Vanjie Mateo; Chris Donaghue
- Country of origin: United States
- Original language: English

Production
- Production company: World of Wonder

Original release
- Network: WOW Presents Plus

Gay Sex Ed is a WOW Presents Plus series featuring drag performers Kameron Michaels and Vanessa Vanjie Mateo, as well as sex therapist Chris Donaghue.

The educational show sees the duo "discussing topics on all things intimate from a gay male perspective", according to Entertainment Weekly.

== Production ==
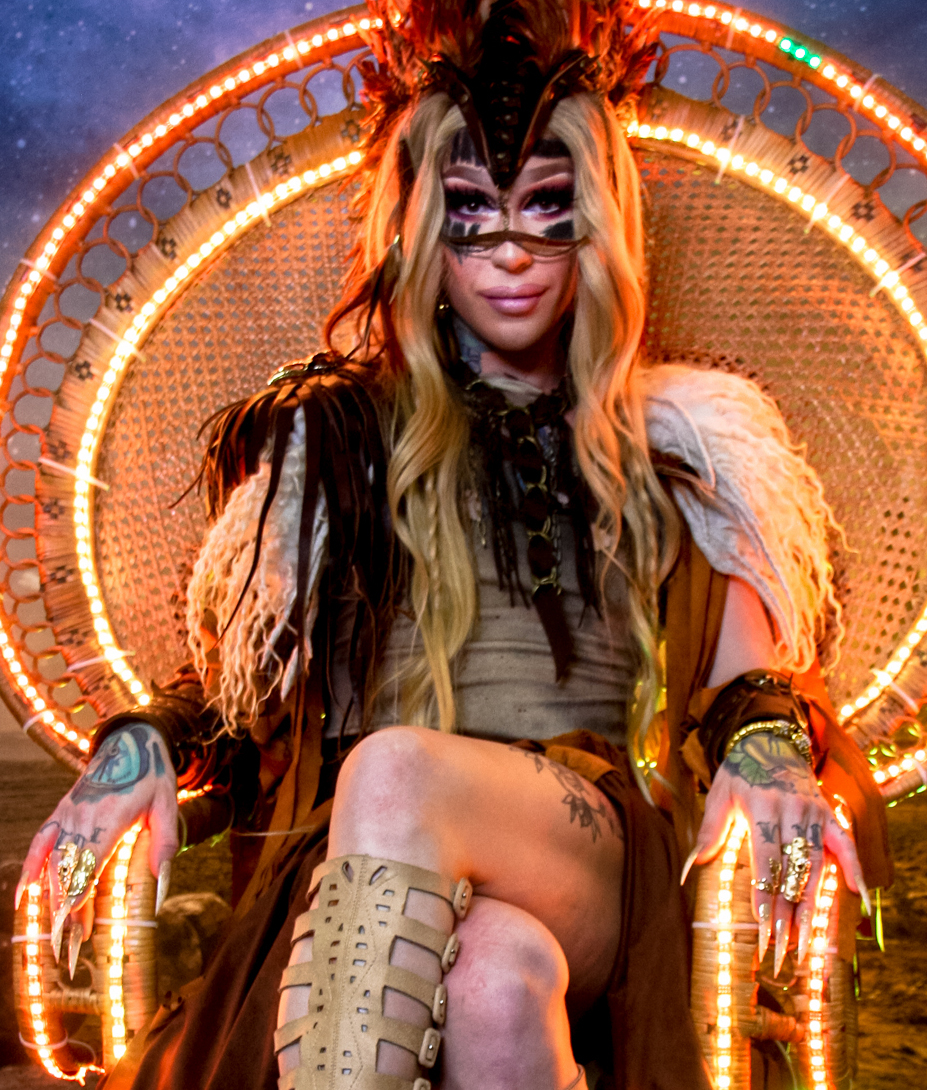
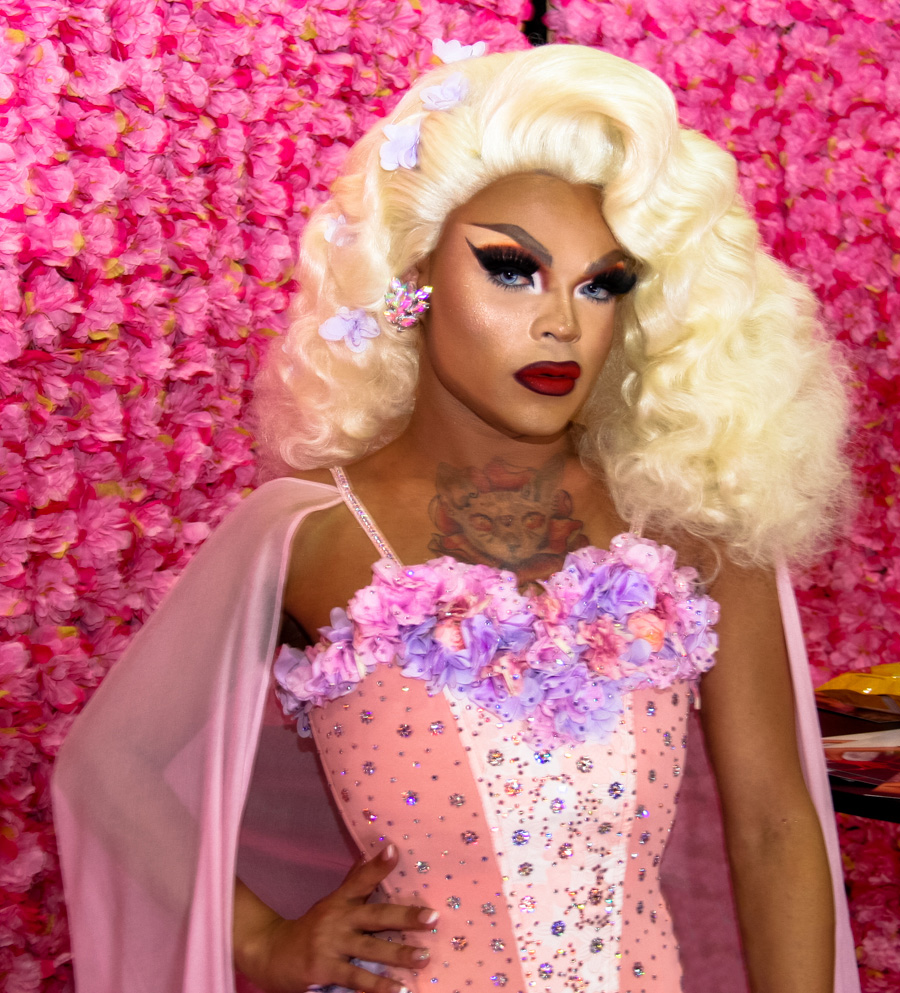
The show is hosted by drag performers Kameron Michaels (left) and Vanessa Vanjie Mateo (right)

The series debuted in May 2021. The second season premiered in March 2022.

The show is part of the WOW Podcast Network.
