= Chris Donaghue =

American sex educator and therapist

- Occupations: Sex education and therapist

Chris Donaghue is an American sex educator and therapist.

== Personal life ==
Donaghue identifies as queer.

== Publications ==
- Sex Outside the Lines: Authentic Sexuality in a Sexually Dysfunctional Culture (2015)
- Rebel Love: Break the Rules, Destroy Toxic Habits, and Have the Best Sex of Your Life (2019)

== See also ==
- Bad Sex
- Center for Healthy Sex
- Gay Sex Ed
- Loveline
- Sex Box
- Sex Box (American TV series)
- Why Won't You Date Me?
- XBIZ Award
