= Sex, Death and the Meaning of Life =

2010 three-part television documentary

- Genre: Documentary
- Starring: Richard Dawkins; Ricky Gervais
- Country of origin: United Kingdom
- Original language: English
- No. of series: 1
- No. of episodes: 3

Production
- Producer: ClearStory
- Running time: 48 minutes (including commercials)

Original release
- Release: 15 October – 29 October 2012

Related
- Faith School Menace; The Unbelievers

Sex, Death and the Meaning of Life is a three-part television documentary presented by Richard Dawkins which explores what reason and science might offer in major events of human lives. He argues that ideas about the soul and the afterlife, of sin and God's purpose have shaped human thinking for thousands of years. He believes science can provide answers to some of these old questions we used to entrust to religion.

== Author ==
Richard Dawkins was born on 26 March 1941. Richard is an emeritus fellow of New College, Oxford. Dawkins has written several books such as The Selfish Gene, The Extended Phenotype, In 2006 Dawkins also founded the Richard Dawkins Foundation for Reason and Science. Dawkins is an atheist and is well known for his criticism of creationism. Dawkins has been awarded many prestigious academic and writing awards and he makes regular television, radio and Internet appearances, predominantly discussing his books, his atheism, and his ideas and opinions as a public intellectual.

== Part 1: Sin ==
First, Dawkins examines issues surrounding the notion of sin. He also explores the rituals that surround mating and the science of disgust and taboo. Dawkins tries to answer the question If we don't believe God is watching over us we abandon morality? Dawkins examines the case for religious morality by speaking with Ray Lewis. Ray Lewis helps run a school in Newham, East London which has been ravaged by gang violence and drugs. Workers like Lewis are trying a tough love approach inspired by Christianity. Dawkins disagrees with this approach and challenges Lewis by trying to use a more scientific approach. The scene ends with the two disagreeing. Dawkins then examines Sex where he goes to a class where men are learning to control their modern addictions through Christ and biblical teaching. Dawkins discovers through a conversation with Darrel Ray, author of Sex & Secularism, that pornography use is its highest among Christians and that Utah and Mississippi, which are considered religious states, have the highest level of pornography viewers. Dawkins further examines this by visiting plastic surgeon Dr. Marc Abecassis that repairs the hymen membrane in women's vaginas. Dr. Abecassis says this procedure provides women to rehabilitate themselves and restore their integrity and that this is a way to give back a pureness to the person that they love. Dawkins sees this as hypocrisy and challenges it by calling it a lie. Dr. Abecassis tells Dawkins that while it may be a lie for him, it is not for others. Dawkins himself subscribes to Kathleen Taylor's notion of “otherization” which cast other that are not your family as beast and subhuman and results in suppressed empathy. Dawkins examines how empathy is making us more moral by speaking to Steven Pinker of Harvard University who has looked at the figures in detail, including data from the British home office and U.S bureau of Justice and found that as religion declines we are becoming ever more civilized. Ultimately, Stevens says that we are not becoming more moral biologically but rather societal factors have made us more moral. The episode ends with Dawkins giving a recap of everything discussed.

== Part 2: Life After Death ==
In the second episode, Dawkins investigates different beliefs about death and afterlife. He brings together neuroscience, evolutionary and genetic theory to examine what happens as we age and why humans crave life after death.

Dawkins begins by explaining that this episode is not about whether God exists or not. Instead, it addresses this question: what, if anything, can take God's place? He asks, what does an atheist like himself do in the face of death? To find out, he travels to Varanasi, India, where pilgrims bring over 40,000 corpses to be burned, and where Hindus aspire to die in order to escape from the cycle of birth, death, and rebirth. They believe the body does not live forever, but the soul does, which Dawkins says is hard to understand as an atheist. He then visits a Catholic hospice in Kansas for babies who die within hours of birth. Patti Lewis, the owner of the home in which this takes place, offers care for the families who have lost newborn babies. Dawkins inquires about Ms. Lewis' idea of life after death and she believes the families will reconnect in their afterlife, leaving the two at a disagreement. He interviews a couple that had lost a newborn baby, and disagrees with their hope for a miracle and belief that it is not their choice to choose the baby's fate.

Dawkins continues to question how people gain reassurance from their faith and wonders how the relationship between death and religion has become so strong. He meets with Dominic Maguire, a funeral director that tells Dawkins how people find reassurance wishing the dead along by saying farewell to the last sight of their physical body. Dawkins claims that while fewer and fewer people believe in God, we still cling to the religious rituals that come along with death. Douglas Davies, an anthropologist, speaks with Dawkins about how death rituals are for the sentimental value of honoring someone's life. He questions why even he, as an atheist, has these sentimental values. He demonstrates people's natural inclination towards believing in different essences of individuals, or souls, by showing an experiment of children being tricked into thinking a hamster was cloned. Dawkins doesn't believe in a soul, but he believes he has some kind of essence that makes him who he is and would potentially differentiate him from a clone of himself.

Dawkins lastly explores the scientific reality of why people die. He claims it is not something to overcome, but it is an evolutionary occurrence that must happen in order for the world to keep developing. He speaks with Irving, a 105-year-old man who has gone to work every day since 1927, in looking for the answer to why some people live longer than others. He discovers that genes affect our lifespan, not lifestyle or environment, and that most centenarians have fewer children at a later age. Dawkins has his entire genome sequenced to find out what keeps him alive and what could potentially cause his death. Dawkins end the episode by concluding that as we learn and understand more about DNA, there will be less of a reliance on religion to cope with and understand death.

== Part 3: The Meaning of Life ==
In the third and final episode, Dawkins examines how both religious and non-religious people struggle to find meaning in their lives. Segments of the episode are anchored to aspects of the lives of writers Leo Tolstoy, Graham Greene, and Albert Camus (specifically The Myth of Sisyphus).

He focuses on figures such as Russian novelist Leo Tolstoy and how throughout his life he comes full circle on his quest to find meaning. Dawkins mentions how like him, Tolstoy was brought up Christian and as a young adult began to question and lose faith in his religion. Tolstoy is quoted, “Why do I live? Is there any meaning in my life that will not be annihilated by the inevitability of death?” Later in life Tolstoy takes a spiritual retreat at Mount St. Bernard Abbey and seeks enlightenment at the monastery.

Dawkins later juxtaposes the methods to which Tolstoy found meaning in his life to Albert Camus a philosopher during WW2 who did not seek religion when searching for the meaning in his life. Camus is quoted in saying, “Without the aid of eternal values, it is necessary to wonder whether life has a meaning.” Camus later in life comes up with the idea of “absurdity” claiming that life must have meaning in order to value it, and that we must find meaning in futile work while analyzing the Greek Myth of Sisyphus.

Towards the episode's end, Dawkins interviews actor Ricky Gervais who is a known atheist of his ideals of what the meaning of life is. Gervais states that for life to be meaningful one must love what they do, and center their life around meaningful relationships. That it doesn't matter what exactly you do, but that you must do something with your life that you enjoy. To the question "Why does an atheist bother to get up in the morning?", Dawkins argues that we each have to forge our own sense of meaning. For him, it is awe and wonder in scientific inquiry. Dawkins comes the conclusion that rather than to accept fate, meaning is found when we revolt against outrageous fortune. That the meaning of life is subjective, personal and that every individual person must set out to give our lives their own meaning.

== Film's reception ==
Sex, Death and the Meaning was praised for moving away from Dawkins' previous coverage of atheism. "But at least in this three-part series the evolutionary biologist gets off his militant atheist’s high horse to tackle the God question from a more constructive angle. Instead of continuing with his usual line – 'God doesn’t exist so get used to it' – he offered ideas as to how we can best prosper in a godless world." Not all viewers were happy with Dawkins documentary. The Independent criticized the documentary for "conflating 'sentiment' with 'illogic', which sometimes feels as if it's missing the point, because sentiment isn't dismayed by accusations of irrationality. It takes pride in it."
