= World War Two: 1941 and the Man of Steel =

World War Two: 1941 and the Man of Steel is a feature-length BBC TV programme, presented by the historian David Reynolds and directed by Russell Barnes. First broadcast on BBC Four on 13 June 2011, it marked the 70th anniversary of Operation Barbarossa, the Third Reich's invasion of the USSR. The programme re-assesses Joseph Stalin's erratic response to the military threat posed by Hitler and examines the moral dilemma for the Western Allies of an alliance with a dictator arguably as brutal as the enemy.

The programme received critical praise and high viewing figures relative to the slot average for BBC Four: 600,000 viewers on its first run in June 2011, 359,000 on its repeat in September 2011, and a further 449,000 on its repeat in April 2012.

The programme was nominated in the Best Historical Documentary category for the 2012 Grierson British Documentary Awards.
