= Gentle Path =

Gentle Path at The Meadows is a program for recovery from sex addiction in Wickenburg, Arizona run by Meadows Behavioral Healthcare. It is based on the work of Patrick Carnes, namely his "Thirty Task model" for sex addiction recovery.
