= Marco Frigatti =

Marco Frigatti (born 1970 in Venice, Italy) is the head of the global records management team for Guinness World Records. He also starred in the Sky One television show Guinness World Records Smashed where he presides over all the record attempts as the show's chief adjudicator.

As a student Frigatti studied languages at the Advanced School of Modern Languages in Trieste. His knowledge of language includes English, German, Italian, French, Dutch and Mandarin.

Later he went on to a career in marketing and communications, which took him around Europe. After finally settling in London, he joined the Guinness World Records company, in 2003.

Frigatti had a catchphrase on the Sky One show, just before a record attempt is undertaken he says: "Marco, Pronto" (translation: Marco, Ready).

Frigatti works as an adjudicator on many other Guinness World Records shows, such as the Italian Lo show dei record, the German Guinness World Records – Die größten Weltrekorde and the Chinese Zheng Da Zong Yi.
