= Long Shadow (TV series) =

British documentary television series

Long Shadow is a three-part television documentary produced by ClearStory and presented by Cambridge University historian David Reynolds. The series is based on David Reynolds’ own book, The Long Shadow: the Great War and the Twentieth Century, published by Simon & Schuster in 2013, which won the 2014 PEN Hessell-Tiltman Prize for History.

Each episode explores an enduring legacy of the First World War through the century that followed, tracing the impact on attitudes to war and peace, on politics and on nationalism. It premiered on BBC2 in September and October 2014, receiving widespread and favourable coverage in the press.

Both the book and the television series focus on how judgments, actions and decisions made by the victors in the First World War set the stage for the Second World War. The peace treaties had produced total chaos in Germany and set the stage for the rise of more rabid German militarism in the 1930s.

The title relates to the long term influence of the First World War on modern realities, and hits on key areas such as America's often conflicted involvement in quintessentially European wars, the poetry of the period and the impacts the First World War had on shaping the modern geopolitical landscape. It has a serious focus on the loss of life and compares and contrasts shifting attitudes towards the pointless loss of young lives during global conflicts.
