= L-E-V Company =

Israeli multimedia company

L-E-V Company is an Israeli dance and spectacle ensemble created by dancer Sharon Eyal and designer of multimedia events Gai Behar.

It has been known as S-E-D, or Sharon Eyal Dance, since 2022.

== History ==
L-E-V (which means "heart" in Hebrew) mixes electronic music, techno, fashion and contemporary works into its productions. L-E-V has performed at venues in its native Israel (e.g. the Israel Festival in Jerusalem), the United States (e.g. Jacob’s Pillow Dance Festival), Europe, Canada and the Festival Internacional Cervantino in Mexico.

Sharon Eyal, born in Jerusalem, danced with the Batsheva Dance Company from 1990 to 2008. She worked as a choreographer and associate artistic director from 2003-2004 and house choreographer from 2005-2012. With Batsheva, she worked for 23 years under Ohad Naharin, and adopted his “Gaga” technique as the base for L-E-V. Since then she was created works for other companies along with L-E-V.

Gai Behar was a party producer in Tel Aviv and a curator of multidisciplinary art events from 1995 to 2005. Behar’s role in the company is to experiment with aspects of performance art, installation and video to combine with dance.

The pair met at an electronic music event organized by Behar in Tel Aviv, with their first collaboration being the project Bertolina in 2005. L-E-V was founded in 2013, premiering in collaboration with the Goteborgs Operans Danskompani in Gothenburg. Later musician Ori Lichtik joined the company. Lichtik is a percussionist and DJ, creating rhythms for dance movements. He was one of the pioneers of techno in Israel, working this type of musical production since 1996. The design of the shows include lighting by Avi Yona Bueno, and costumes by Ma’ayan Goldman and Odelia Arnold.

== Critical acclaim ==
A review in the New York Times stated that L-E-V “has a defined style that takes most troupes years to develop… In the work’s best moments, this all suggests a Hieronymous Bosch painting of an extraterrestrial rave…. But though they range widely in size, they are too close to being clones. And though the choreography has multiple modes, the overriding aesthetic gives everything a numbing sameness.

== See also ==
- Dance in Israel
- Culture of Israel
