= Warren Kimball =

American historian

Warren Forbes Kimball (born December 24, 1935) is a historian of the Second World War and American foreign policy. He was an academic adviser to the Churchill Centre in London.

He graduated from Georgetown University and taught at Rutgers University.

Kimball argues that the American president Franklin D. Roosevelt only sought a "limited war" against Germany at first, and that the atomic bombings of Hiroshima and Nagasaki were a geopolitical tool by the United States to assert its power over the Soviet Union through intimidation. He contends that Roosevelt had a consistent foreign policy during the war: that of a post-war liberal international order based on shared values and co-operation between the U.S. and its western wartime allies, the recognition of the Soviet Union and its integration into this system, and the dismantling of European empires and colonies after the war.

He has also written on the Morgenthau Plan, and argues that the British Foreign Office knew of the plans ten days before the First Quebec Conference in 1943. He has argued against the notion that the plan was intended to be punitive, saying that United States Secretary of the Treasury Henry Morgenthau Jr.'s plans were intended to make Germany into "good, honest, democratic yeomen farmers, the Jeffersonian ideal". He has also written about the history of the Lend-Lease Act and the topic of white European guilt in postcolonial thought.

== Bibliography ==
- Kimball, Warren F. (1969). The Most Unsordid Act: Lend-Lease, 1939-1941. Johns Hopkins University Press. ISBN 978-1-4214-3071-3.
- Kimball, Warren F. (8 December 2015). Churchill and Roosevelt, Volume 1: The Complete Correspondence - Three Volumes. Princeton University Press. ISBN 978-1-4008-7574-0. [originally published 1984]
- Kimball, Warren F. (28 August 1994). The Juggler: Franklin Roosevelt as Wartime Statesman. Princeton University Press. ISBN 978-0-691-03730-1. [originally published 1991]
- Kimball, Warren F. (8 February 2011). Forged in War: Roosevelt, Churchill, And The Second World War. Harper Collins. ISBN 978-0-06-203484-7. [originally published 1997]
