= Bad Sex =

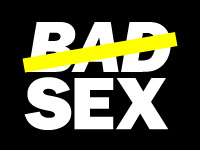
- Genre: Reality
- Starring: Chris Donaghue
- Country of origin: United States
- Original language: English
- No. of seasons: 2
- No. of episodes: 20

Production
- Executive producers: Brent Zacky; Julie Pizzi; Pamela Post; Patty Ivins; Stevenson Greene
- Production location: Los Angeles, California
- Production company: PB&J Television

Original release
- Network: Logo
- Release: November 4, 2011 – June 10, 2014

Bad Sex is an American reality television series airing on Logo. The series follows 10 diverse participants undergoing a two-month program with sex specialist Chris Donaghue. The participants are male and female, gay and hetero, range in age from 20–40 years old. They attend a group therapy session with issues ranging from dangerous promiscuity to clinical frigidity, from violent sex addiction to compulsive public sex. Under his supervision in the sex therapy group program they'll finally address their deep-rooted issues around sex, infidelity, trust, relational intimacy and sexual addiction.

== Cast ==
Season 1:

- Chris Donaghue - A sex specialist based in Los Angeles, California.
- Ryan
- Joel
- Aaron
- Ted
- Kaitie
- Matt
- Chris
- Stella
- Erin

Season 2:

- Chris Donaghue
- Alex
- Courtney
- Tyler
- Moniesha
- Aaron
- Ian
- Jennifer
- Vince
- Joe
- Jay

== Episodes ==
=== Season 1 ===
Episode #	Title	Original release date
1	"Addicted to Sex"	November 4, 2011
Sex specialist Chris Donaghue treats Ryan, a client whose every waking moment is controlled by his addiction to sex. He is putting his life in danger and Chris's treatment may be his last chance.
2	"Cheaters Never Prosper"	November 11, 2011
Joel, a sex addict whose desperate need for sex has turned him into a habitual liar and wreaks havoc on his sense of self worth.
3	"Some Like it Rough"	November 18, 2011
Erin, a love addict, who is also addicted to rough sex.
4	"Surfing for Sex"	December 2, 2011
Ted, a misogynistic loner who is incapable of meeting women in person because of his addiction to hunting for sex online. Ted's compulsion has caused him to lose his friends and put his health and safety at risk.
5	"Love Triangles Can Be Deadly"	December 9, 2011
Kaitie, a polyamorous 20-something whose lack of boundaries lands her smack in the middle of a love triangle with two of the group members.
6	"The Spider Man"	December 16, 2011
Matt, a 29-year-old animal lover who has only had intercourse once. Matt has a debilitating anxiety disorder, which makes him incapable of interacting with women and terrified to have sex again.
7	"Coming Out Is Never Easy"	January 2, 2012
Chris, whose sex addiction has already destroyed his first relationship. With his urges spiraling out of control, Chris is worried that his obsession with sex will cause his new boyfriend to leave him.
8	"How Stella Got Her Groove On"	January 9, 2012
Stella, a 37-year-old virgin who is afraid to have intercourse. Will she let her guard down and start a meaningful sexual relationship with a man or will she continue to hide behind her fear.
9	"Addicted to Everything"	January 16, 2012
Aaron, who has a history of multiple addictions, including food, drugs and internet sex.
10	"Addicted to Love"	January 23, 2012
Ric, a love addict who has instantly fallen for a new woman in his life. But his intense jealousy and violent temper begins to threaten the safety of everyone around him.

=== Season 2 ===
Episode #	Title	Original release date
1 (11)	"Fifty Shades of Gay"	May 27, 2014
Sex therapist Chris Donaghue treats Alex whose addiction to extreme BDSM compels him to torture himself and his lovers, pushing the boundaries of safety.
2 (12)	"Stripped of Sex"	May 27, 2014
Courtney, a former stripper who has lost the desire to have sex with her fiance.
3 (13)	"Dateless"	May 27, 2014
Tyler, a love addict whose painful breakup with his ex-boyfriend has destroyed his ability to date anyone new.
4 (14)	"She Just Can't Get Enough"	June 3, 2014
Moniesha, a female sex addict, who sleeps with both men and women as she tries to satisfy her insatiable appetite for sex.
5 (15)	"Phone Sex"	June 3, 2014
Aaron, who is addicted to using his phone apps to meet random men for sex.
6 (16)	"Three's A Crowd"	June 3, 2014
Ian, whose addiction to threesomes is ruining his relationship with his girlfriend.
7 (17)	"A History of Violence"	June 10, 2014
Jennifer, a victim of abuse who can only enjoy sex if she is violently beaten.
8 (18)	"Funny Man"	June 10, 2014
Vince, whose addiction to rough sex is threatening his safety. Vince is a comedian who uses humor and sex to cover up a dark secret from his past.
9 (19)	"Get A Grip"	June 10, 2014
Joe, who has isolated himself from everyone in his life.
10 (20)	"Clowning Around"	June 10, 2014
Jay, a sex addict with an intense clown fetish.
