= Patrick Carnes =

American author and counselor

- Born: 1944 (age 80–81)
- Education: University of Minnesota (PhD, 1980)
- Occupation: Counselor

Patrick Carnes (born 1944) is an American author and counselor. He is a proponent of the viewpoint that some sexual behavior is an addiction. According to CBS News, he popularized the term sex addiction. He created the International Institute for Trauma and Addiction Professionals (IITAP), as well as numerous addiction treatment facilities, and created the CSAT certification.

== Education and career ==
Carnes received a Ph.D. in counselor education and organizational development from the University of Minnesota in 1980. He was awarded the distinguished Lifetime Achievement Award of the Society for the Advancement of Sexual Health (SASH), formerly known as National Council on Sexual Addiction and Compulsivity (NCSAC). Each year, SASH bestows a Carnes Award to deserving researchers and clinicians who have made outstanding contributions to the field of sexual medicine.

He has worked in the field of sexual addiction in a number of other capacities, including as clinical director for sexual disorder services at The Meadows in Wickenburg, Arizona, editor-in-chief of Sexual Addiction and Compulsivity: The Journal of Treatment and Prevention (official journal of the National Council of Sexual Addiction/Compulsivity), board member of the National Council of Sexual Addiction/Compulsivity organization, advisor on the national advisory board of the American Academy of Health Care Providers in the Addictive Disorders. Carnes is the Founder and Senior Consultant of the Gentle Path at The Meadows program located in Wickenburg, Arizona.

Carnes is the founder of the International Institute for Trauma and Addiction Professionals.

== Theories and criticism ==
Carnes attributes the source of the addictions to the addict's belief system. He believes that a fundamental momentum for the addiction is provided by "certain core beliefs" that are wrong or incorrect. "Generally, addicts do not perceive themselves as worthwhile persons. Nor do they believe that other people would care for them or meet their needs if everything was known about them, including the addiction. Finally, they believe that sex is their most important need. Sex is what makes isolation bearable. If you do not trust people, one thing that is true about sex – and alcohol, food, gambling, and risk – is that it always does what it promises--for the moment. Thus, as in our definition of addiction, the relationship is with sex – and not people."

Carnes' idea of sexual addiction is controversial. Carnes acknowledges that "the term sexual addiction does not appear in DSM-IV. In fact, the word addiction itself does not appear." He continues, saying that "Each edition of this book represents a consensus at the time of publication about what constitutes mental disorders. Each subsequent edition has reflected changes in understanding. The DSM's system is, therefore, best viewed as a 'work in progress rather than the 'bible'." The DSM-5, published in 2013, did not include sexual addiction, "as the research on these behaviors was considered to be insufficient."

== Books ==
- Don't Call it Love: Recovery from Sexual Addiction. Bantam Books. 1992. p. 441. ISBN 0553351389.
- Contrary to Love: Helping the Sexual Addict. Hazelden Publishing. 1994. p. 312. ISBN 1568380593.
- Sexual Anorexia: Overcoming Sexual Self-Hatred. Hazelden Publishing. 1997. p. 420. ISBN 1568381441.
- The Betrayal Bond: Breaking Free of Exploitative Relationships. HCI. 1997. p. 282. ISBN 9780757318245.
- Open Hearts: Renewing Relationships with Recovery, Romance & Reality. Gentle Path. 1999. p. 230. ISBN 9781929866007.
- Out of the Shadows: Understanding Sexual Addiction. Hazelden Publishing. 2001. p. 240. ISBN 1568386214.
- Facing the Shadow: Starting Sexual and Relationship Recovery : a Gentle Path to Beginning Recovery from Sex Addiction. Gentle Path. 2005. p. 308. ISBN 9780977440009.
- In the Shadows of the Net: Breaking Free of Compulsive Online Sexual Behavior. Simon and Schuster. 2009. p. 264. ISBN 9781592857869.
- Recovery Zone: Making Changes That Last: The Internal Tasks. Gentle Path. 2009. p. 307. ISBN 9780977440016.
- Facing Addiction: Starting Recovery from Alcohol and Drugs. Gentle Path. 2011. p. 296. ISBN 9780982650561.
- A Gentle Path through the Twelve Principles: Living the Values Behind the Steps. Hazelden Publishing. 2012. p. 280. ISBN 9781592859979.
- A Gentle Path through the Twelve Steps: The Classic Guide for All People in the Process of Recovery. Simon and Schuster. 2012. p. 340. ISBN 978-1592859962.
