= The Genius of Charles Darwin =

2008 film by Russell Barnes and Dan Hillman

- Written by: Richard Dawkins
- Directed by: Russell Barnes, Dan Hillman
- Starring: Richard Dawkins
- Country of origin: United Kingdom
- Original language: English

Production
- Producers: Russell Barnes, Dan Hillman, IWC Media
- Editor: Matt Platts-Mills
- Running time: 138 minutes

Original release
- Release: 4 August – 18 August 2008

The Genius of Charles Darwin is a three-part television documentary, written and presented by evolutionary biologist Richard Dawkins.

It was first shown in August 2008 on Channel 4. It won Best TV Documentary Series 2008 at the British Broadcast Awards in January 2009.

== Part 1: Life, Darwin & Everything ==
In the first episode Richard Dawkins explains the basic mechanisms of natural selection, and tells the story of how Charles Darwin developed his theory.

He teaches a year 11 science class about evolution, which many of the students are reluctant to accept. He then takes them to the Jurassic Coast in Dorset to search for fossils, hoping that the students can see some of the evidence for themselves.

Dawkins also visits the place of his birth, Nairobi, where he interviews a prostitute who seems to have a genetic immunity to HIV, and goes on to predict that genetic immunity is a trait that will become more prevalent in the community over time. He also talks to scientist Craig Venter about the DNA evidence for Darwin's theory.

== Part 2: The Fifth Ape ==
In the second episode Richard Dawkins deals with some of the philosophical and social ramifications of the theory of evolution.

Dawkins starts out in Kenya, speaking with palaeontologist Richard Leakey. He then visits Christ is the Answer Ministries, Kenya's largest Pentecostal church, to interview Bishop Bonifes Adoyo. Adoyo has led the movement to press the National Museums of Kenya to sideline its collection of hominid bones pointing to man's evolution from ape to human. The collection includes the Turkana Boy discovered by Kamoya Kimeu, a member of a team led by Richard Leakey in 1984.

Dawkins discusses social Darwinism and eugenics, explaining how these are not versions of natural selection, and that "Darwin has been wrongly tainted".

He then meets with evolutionary psychologist Steven Pinker to discuss how morals can be compatible with natural selection. He goes on to explaining sexual selection, with peafowls as an example. To find out whether sexual selection plays a role for altruism and kindness among humans, he visits women who are looking for sperm donors, as well as a sperm bank manager. Dawkins also explains kin selection and selfish genes.

Dawkins talks with Dutch primatologist and ethologist Frans de Waal about empathy among chimpanzees.

== Part 3: God Strikes Back ==
In the third and final episode, Dawkins explains why Darwin's theory is one of history's most controversial ideas.

Dawkins uses this episode to discuss the opposition that evolution has experienced since it was first discovered. He starts by approaching various anti-evolutionists, ranging from John Mackay from Creation Research, Wendy Wright, President of Concerned Women for America, to English school teacher Nick Cowen. In order to address concerns they bring up, he shows the evidence for evolution, including fossil and DNA evidence. He also talks to the teachers of the science students who he taught during the first episode, asking them why they aren't adequately teaching the ideas of science properly, allowing instead their students to believe that truth is personal and that science is merely a point of view. He also interviews Rowan Williams whose Church of England Christianity is more compatible with evolution.

Dawkins' last interview is with the philosopher Daniel Dennett. They discuss whether Darwinism deprives people of consolation or rather provides them with greater understanding, context, and therefore, meaning.

Dawkins: Our brains that are so capable of appreciating this have been produced by the very same process that we are now appreciating.
Dennett: Sometimes I like to say the planet has grown a nervous system and it's us.

Dawkins also describes Darwin's personal loss of faith, based not only on the natural mechanisms he saw, but also on the cruelty in the world which seemed to deny a loving God, in particular the loss of his daughter Annie. While Dawkins does address the bleakness of the Darwinian view, he spends the last part of this episode describing how Darwin and he himself address it, ending by saying:

In the perspective of the universe, the vastness of the universe and of geological time, we are insignificant. Some people find the thought disturbing, even frightening. Like Darwin, I find the reality thrilling.
