= Voice of the Listener & Viewer =

British Charity championing public service broadcasting

- Formation: 1983; 43 years ago
- Legal status: Registered Charity
- Purpose: VLV is known as the authoritative voice in broadcasting policy making on behalf of citizens
- Region served: United Kingdom
- Members: 1,500
- Chairman: Colin Browne
- Website: VLV

The Voice of the Listener & Viewer (VLV), originally just Voice of the Listener, is an independent, membership-based charity, free from political and sectarian affiliations, championing public service broadcasting and speaking for listeners and viewers on the full range of broadcasting and media issues. It was founded in 1983 by Jocelyn Hay. In 2008, The Telegraph described Hay as "possibly the best lobbyist in the whole UK".

‘The VLV has long been a trusted voice for those who value the unique ecology of public service broadcasting in the UK. Their thoughtful and insightful contributions to numerous broadcasting inquiries held by the Government, Parliament, Ofcom and others have always been significant and one of the most quoted voices in the reports and conclusions that follow. They continue to play a vital role in ensuring the voice of the public is heard in the many current debates surrounding the future of public service broadcasting’ BBC Public Affairs, March 2023.

VLV has a significant track record in successful policy intervention to ensure that regulation supports the needs of citizens. VLV is respected and listened to by both Government and broadcasters. Policy Submissions prepared by VLV can be found here https://www.vlv.org.uk/issues-policies/vlv-consultation-responses/

VLV aims to respond to all relevant consultations on broadcasting with the goal of ensuring that citizens have a voice in the debate.

VLV engages with Parliamentarians, Select Committees, Ofcom, the Public Service Broadcasters and UK Government to represent citizens’ interests.

VLV holds regular events – both online and in person – to inspire, inform and engage with the public and policymakers.

VLV petitions the Government, Ofcom and the BBC to engage more directly with citizens to increase transparency and their accountability.

In 2022 VLV set up the Citizens’ PSM Forum comprising British civil society organisations to advocate on behalf of citizens interests in the policy debate. Details of the membership of the forum are here https://vlv.org.uk/get-involved/citizens-forum-for-public-service-media/ The Forum has become a respected ‘voice’ in the policy debate. The Forum is funded by the Joseph Rowntree Charitable Trust https://www.jrct.org.uk/home through their Power and Accountability Programme.

== Awards for Excellence ==
The Annual Awards for Excellence celebrating television and audio that contributed to public service broadcasting excellence, are nominated and voted for by VLV’s members.
