= International Institute for Trauma and Addiction Professionals =

Mental health certification organization

The International Institute for Trauma and Addiction Professionals (IITAP) is one of the most well-known, for-profit organizations that provides training and certification for licensed and interned mental health professionals who want to treat sexual addiction, partner trauma/betrayal, and other compulsive behaviors in their clients. Despite the concept of sexual addiction being contentious in the fields of psychology, medicine, and neuroscience, and was not included in the DSM as of 2017, the need for this type of certification has been demonstrated over several decades.

IITAP's training and certification program is based on the work of Dr. Patrick Carnes and his 30 Task Model. Dr. Carnes has been pioneering work in sexually compulsive behavior since the 1980s, and he is also the founder of IITAP. His daughter, Dr. Stefanie Carnes, also a renowned marriage and family therapist, clinical sexologist, Rainbow Advocate and Educator, and CSAT-Supervisor, is IITAP's president.

Public interest in sexual addiction and IITAP's programs are often driven by celebrities caught up in a scandal, and blaming their trouble on sexual addiction.
