= Phillip Hodson =

British psychotherapist, broadcaster and writer (born 1946)

- Born: April 1946 (age 80); Bedfordshire, England
- Occupations: Psychotherapist; broadcaster; author
- Partner: Anne Hooper
- Children: 1

Phillip Hodson (born April 1946) is a British psychotherapist, broadcaster and author who popularised ‘phone-in’ therapy in his role as Britain's first 'agony uncle'. His afternoon and evening counselling programmes ran on LBC Radio in London for nearly 20 years. Thereafter he worked on Talk Radio UK and with Jimmy Young on BBC Radio 2.

== Early life ==
Hodson was born in April 1946 in Bedfordshire.

== Career ==
=== Television ===
He was a regular children's counsellor on BBC1 for six years with Saturday Superstore and Going Live! presented by Sarah Greene and Phillip Schofield, where he was noted for addressing serious juvenile concerns not normally treated on children's television. Hodson also worked on BBC1 Daytime with Dr Miriam Stoppard for three years dealing with problem phone calls besides interviewing and ‘analysing’ celebrities. He also filled the agony slots in the first years of both TV-am and GMTV.

Hodson co-presented TV South's afternoon Problem Page for five years and was subsequently given his own interview chat show Hodson Confidential. This ran for three series, and was networked several times. He has also made several documentaries including films for Newsnight on subjects such as scandal-prone politicians.

=== Journalism ===
Hodson has contributed to The Times and written extensively for the popular press including agony pages for Reveille, The Daily Star, Today and the News of the World. His column has also appeared in publications such as Woman's World, Cosmopolitan, Family Circle, Fast Forward, TV Quick, Woman and Home and Woman's Journal. Hodson won a 'columnist of the year' in 1984. He has been an outspoken critic of the 'stiff upper lip' attitude of male conservatism – clashing, amongst others, with the sociologist Frank Furedi.

=== Books, academic and psychotherapy work ===
Hodson has written 13 books mainly on sex and relationships but also covering the operas of Wagner. His most important is probably Men: An Investigation into the Emotional Male, which accompanied a BBC TV series in one of the first male engagements with the challenges of feminism. He has also taught psychology at the graduate level and made training films for Video Arts Ltd about using counselling techniques in the workplace, and he has also won several industry awards. In addition to his psychotherapy practice, Hodson was Chief Spokesperson for the British Association for Counselling and Psychotherapy (from 2005 to 2013) and subsequently for the United Kingdom Council for Psychotherapy.

Phillip Hodson has been ‘happily unmarried’ to author and psychotherapist Anne Hooper for over 40 years, with whom he has a son and two stepsons. All of the family have worked in the media.
