= Tracey Cox =

English non-fiction author and columnist

- Born: 1 November 1961 (age 64); Exeter, Devon, England

Tracey Jane Cox (born 1 November 1961) is an English non-fiction author and columnist who specialises in books on dating, sex and relationships.

Cox appeared as a relationship expert on Jo Whiley's show on BBC Radio 1. Her television career has included co-presenting programmes like Would Like To Meet on BBC2 and The Sex Inspectors for Channel 4 in Britain. She is also a columnist for newspapers and magazines, as of 2013 writing weekly for Closer magazine in Britain and the Mail Online.

Cox was born in Britain but spent many years in Australia where she edited Cosmopolitan magazine and had her own radio show. Although not much information is known about Cox herself, a great deal can be learnt about her from her books as they contain snippets from her own personal experiences. Hot Relationships was written after her divorce.

== Personal life ==
Cox claims her career choice is thanks to her older sister, who was a family-planning nurse. Cox says she "grew up surrounded by condoms" and tea-parties.

Cox was diagnosed with cancer of the cervix at the age of 30. The surgery was successful but it left her cervix so damaged that doctors said she would probably never have a baby.

== Books ==
- Hot Sex [Corgi Books, 1998] ISBN 0-552-14707-9
- Hot Relationships [Corgi Books, 1999] ISBN 0-552-14784-2
- Would Like To Meet (with Jeremy Milnes and Jay Hunt) [BBC Worldwide, 2002] ISBN 0-563-48843-3
- Supersex [Dorling Kindersley Limited, 2002] ISBN 0-7513-3864-8
- Superflirt [Dorling Kindersley Limited, 2003] ISBN 1-4053-0065-5
- Superdate [Dorling Kindersley Limited, 2005] ISBN 1-4053-0706-4
- Quickies (Dorling Kindersley Limited)
- The Sex Inspectors Masterclass (BBC books)
- Superhotsex [Dorling Kindersley Limited, 2006] ISBN 0-7566-2275-1
- The Sex Doctor (Corgi Books)
- The Kama Sutra (Dorling Kindersley Limited)
- Sextasy
- Supersex for Life
- 100 Hot Sex Positions
