= Premarital sex =

Sexual activity before marriage

Percentage of births to unmarried women, selected countries, 1980 and 2007

Premarital sex is sex before marriage. It is an act of sex between two people who are not married to each other. In many major religions (including Christianity, Islam, and Judaism), premarital sex is considered a major sin and is morally prohibited. It is also considered a moral issue which is taboo in many cultures.

Since the second half of the 20th century, it has become accepted by certain liberal and progressive social movements, especially in the Western world. A 2014 Pew study on global morality found that premarital sex was considered particularly unacceptable in Muslim-majority countries, such as Malaysia, Jordan, and Pakistan, each having over 90% disapproval, while people in Western European countries were the most accepting, with Spain, Germany, and France expressing less than 10% disapproval.

== Definition ==
Until the 1950s, "premarital sex" referred to sexual relations between two people prior to marrying each other. During that period, it was generally normal in Western societies for men and women to marry above the age of 21, and there were no considerations that one who had sex would not marry. The term was used instead of fornication, which had negative connotations, and was closely related to the concept and approval of virginity, which is sexual abstinence until marriage.

The meaning has since shifted to refer to any sexual relations a person has prior to marriage and removing the emphasis on the relationship of the people involved. The definition has a degree of ambiguity. It is not clear whether sex between individuals legally forbidden from marrying or the sexual relations of one uninterested in marrying would be considered premarital.

Alternative terms for premarital sex have been suggested, including non-marital sex (which overlaps with adultery), youthful sex, adolescent sex, and young-adult sex. These terms also suffer from a degree of ambiguity, as the definition of having sex differs from person to person.

== Prevalence ==
In modern Western cultures, social value of sexual abstinence before marriage has declined. Historically, a significant portion of people had engaged in premarital sex, although the number willing to admit to this was not always high. In a study conducted in the United States, 61 percent of men and 12 percent of women born prior to 1910 admitted to having premarital sex; this gender disparity may have been caused by cultural double standards regarding the admission of sexual activity, or by men frequenting prostitutes.

Starting in the 1920s, and especially after World War II, premarital sex became more common, particularly among women. By the end of the 20th century, between 75 and 80 percent of Americans had experienced sexual intercourse before the age of 22. This has been attributed to numerous causes, including the increasing median age at marriage and the widespread availability of efficient contraceptives.

According to a 2001 UNICEF survey, in 10 out of 12 developed nations with available data, more than two-thirds of young people have had sexual intercourse while still in their teens. In Denmark, Finland, Germany, Iceland, Norway, the United Kingdom and the United States, the proportion is over 80%. In Australia, the United Kingdom and the United States, approximately 25% of 15-year-olds and 50% of 17-year-olds have sex. In a 2005 Kaiser Family Foundation study of US teenagers, 29% of teens reported feeling pressure to have sex, 33% of sexually active teens reported "being in a relationship where they felt things were moving too fast sexually", and 24% had "done something sexual they didn't really want to do". Several polls have indicated peer pressure as a factor in encouraging both girls and boys to have sex.

A majority of Americans have had premarital sex, according to a 2007 article in Public Health Reports. This is true for current young adults and also young adults in the late 1950s and early 1960s. Data from the National Survey of Family Growth indicate that in 2002, 77% of Americans had sex by age 20, and of that percent, 75% had premarital sex. Of women who were born between 1949 and 1978, approximately 91% had premarital sex by age 30, and of women who were born between 1939 and 1948, 82% of them had had premarital sex by age 30.

When comparing the General Social Survey of 1988–1996 to the one of 2004–2012, researchers found that participants of 2004–2012 did not report more sexual partners since the age of 18, nor more frequent sex or sex partners during the past year than those respondents of the previous survey. There appears to be no substantial change in sexual behavior contrasting the earlier era to the current one. Current-era respondents were more likely to report having sex with a casual date or friend than reporting having sex with a spouse or regular partner. From 1943 to 1999, young women's approval towards premarital sex increased from 12% to 73%, and from 40% to 79% among young men. The percentage of people who felt guilt around premarital sex also decreased during this period. As of 2005, less than 25% of people believe premarital sex is “always or almost always” wrong.

=== Gender differences ===
Within the United States, a cohort study of young adults in university found that men self-report more permissive attitudes about casual sex than women. Another study found university students can be grouped by their ideal relationships—those who express a desire for sex exclusively in a committed partnership have fewer hookups and "friends with benefits" partners than those categorised as desiring "flexible" relationships and recreational sex.

A 2006 study that analysed the Toledo Adolescent Relationships Study found that more boys report having non-dating sexual partners than girls. Of this sample, a third of boys only have had sex with their romantic partner. A third of boys who have had sex with a partner they are not dating within the past year wished for the girl to be their girlfriend. Many young adults are more likely to engage in sex with romantic partners than with casual acquaintances or "friends with benefits."

A 2011 study that surveyed young adults about their emotional reactions after premarital sexual encounters found that men reported more positive and fewer negative emotional reactions, and both men and women reported that the experience was largely more positive than negative. Women reported that condom use was associated with fewer positive and more negative emotional reactions, and for men condom use was associated with fewer negative emotional reactions. A 23-year study in a Human Sexuality class investigated gender differences in men and women's reactions to their first sexual experience. In the earlier years of the study, men reported more pleasure and greater anxiety than women, while women reported more feelings of guilt than men. Cohort studies carried out over 23 years found that in later years, women expressed greater pleasure and less guilt. The differences between emotional reactions among men and women decreased slightly during the 23 years. Such decreases in differences to first sexual intercourse may be a result of the increasing normality of premarital sex in America. An international online sex survey compared responses of residents of 37 countries against World Economic Forum figures for gender equality in those countries, finding that countries with high gender equality had respondents report more casual sex, a greater number of sex partners, younger ages for first sex, and greater tolerance of premarital sex.

In some countries, gender differences with premarital sex can be linked to virginity. In India, a woman may undergo a "virginity test" on her wedding night where she can be banished by her husband or subject to an honor killing if found she is no longer a virgin. Men are not subjected to this same test and could get away with having premarital sex. In Iran, if a husband finds out his wife had premarital sex, it can be used as grounds for divorce. Therefore, hymen reconstruction surgery is not uncommon for women who wish to prove their virginity.

=== Ethnicity differences ===
Different ethnic and cultural groups in America have varied religiosity and sexual attitudes. A study with college participants found that Asians had more conservative sexual attitudes compared to Hispanics and Euro-Americans. Hispanics reported sexual attitudes similar to that of Euro-Americans. Asian, Hispanic, and Euro-American women with high levels of spirituality were found to have a correlation between conservative sexual attitudes and perceived religiosity. Religiosity and religious fundamentalism most strongly predicted conservative sexual attitudes in Euro-Americans and Asians.

In India, among the never married males who did sexual intercourse increases from 4% in age 15-17 to 23% in age 23-24 and among the never married females who did sexual intercourse increases from 2% in age 15-17 to 5% in age 23-24 as per the National Family Health Survey - 5, 2019-21. In the Indian city of Mumbai, research showed that among college-age students, 3% of females affirmed having premarital sex and 26% of males affirmed having premarital sex. Population Council, an international NGO, released a working report in 2006 showing similar statistics nationally in India, with fewer than ten percent of young females reporting having had premarital sex, compared with 15% to 30% of young males. In Pakistan, 11% of men were reported as having participated in pre-marital sex, although a greater percentage, 29% reported having participated in non-marital sex.

== Safe sex practices ==
People who have premarital sex are recommended by health professionals to take precautions to protect themselves against sexually transmitted infections (STIs) such as HIV/AIDS. There is also a risk of an unplanned pregnancy in heterosexual relationships. Around the world, sex education programs are run to teach school students about reproductive health, safe sex, sexual abstinence, and birth control.

Sexual activity among unmarried people who do not have access to information about reproductive health and birth control can increase the rate of teenage pregnancies and contraction of sexually transmitted infections. The rates of teenage pregnancy vary and range from 143 per 1000 girls in some sub-Saharan African countries to 2.9 per 1000 girls in South Korea. The rate for the United States is 52.1 per 1000, the highest in the developed world, and about four times the European Union average. The teenage pregnancy rates between countries must take into account the level of general sex education available and access to contraceptive options.

== Religion ==
Views on premarital sex are often shaped by religious teachings and beliefs, in part because ancient religious texts forbid it. People who actively practice religion are less likely to engage in premarital sex or at least go longer before having sex for the first time. Evangelical Christian young adults (ages 15 through 22) who are never married are much less likely to engage in premarital sex if they attend church services on a weekly basis, compared to those with no church attendance. Additionally, among Christians who have never been married, those who consider religion to be "very important" engage less in premarital sexual intercourse than those who view religion as "somewhat important". Those young adult Christians who belong to conservative denominations (e.g. Conservative Mennonites) are less likely to engage in premarital sex than those who are members of mainline churches.

One study published in 2013 indicated that Muslims and Hindus are less likely to report having premarital sex than Christians, Jews, and Buddhists. The study indicated that people in predominantly Islamic societies have the lowest report of engaging in premarital sex, 53% lower than Christians (primarily in Europe and North America). Buddhists, Jews, and individuals from other religious traditions are more likely to report premarital sex compared to Christians. While Christianity, Judaism, and Islam have strict rules regarding sex outside of marriage, Buddhism lacks such specific behavioral prohibitions, though its ethical precepts still discourage premarital sex. Studies shows Buddhists are more likely than Muslims, Christians, Hindus, and people of traditional faiths to report premarital sex, with rates similar to Jews and no significant differences regarding extramarital sex.

Students who attend a faith-based (predominantly Christian) university view premarital sexual activity more negatively than students who do not.

== Cultural views ==
The cultural acceptability of premarital sex varies between individuals, cultures and time periods. Western cultures have traditionally been disapproving of it, on occasions forbidding it. In other cultures, such as the Muria people of Madhya Pradesh, sexuality prior to marriage is accepted and at times expected.

Individual views within a given society can vary greatly, with expectations ranging from total abstinence to frequent casual sex. These views are dependent on the holders' value system, as formed by their parents, religion, friends, experiences, and in many cases the media. Unmarried cohabitation and births outside marriage have increased in many Western countries during the past few decades. Economist Jeremy Greenwood (2019, Chp. 4) discusses how technological progress in contraception led to a rise in premarital sex and less stigmatization by parents, churches, and governments. He argues that singles weigh the cost (a potential pregnancy) and benefit of premarital sex. As contraception improved the cost of premarital sexual activity fell. Parents and social institutions also weigh the cost and benefit of socialization. Technological improvement in contraception reduced the benefit of socialization because premarital sexual activity was no longer as risky in terms of unwanted pregnancies, which placed a strain on parents and social institutions. As a result, there was social change.

=== United Kingdom ===
Sex before the public marriage ceremony was normal in the Anglican Church until the Marriage Act 1753, which for the first time required all marriages in England and Wales occur in their parish church. (The law also applied to Catholics, but Jews and Quakers were exempt.) Before its enactment couples lived and slept together after their betrothal or "the spousals", which was considered a legal marriage. Until the mid-1700s it was normal and acceptable for the bride to be pregnant at the nuptials, the later public ceremony for the marriage. The Marriage Act 1753 combined the spousals and nuptials, and by the start of the 19th century social convention prescribed that brides be virgins at marriage. Illegitimacy became more socially discouraged, with first pregnancies outside marriage declining from 40% to 20% during the Victorian era. At the start of the 21st century, the figure was back up to 40%.

In the United Kingdom, births outside marriage were up to 47.6% by 2012. In 2014, only 13% of the population found premarital sex unacceptable.

=== United States ===
During the colonial period, premarital sex was publicly frowned upon but privately condoned to an extent. Unmarried teenagers were often allowed to spend the night in bed together, though some measures such as bundling were sometimes attempted to prevent sexual intercourse. Even though premarital sex was somewhat condoned, having a child outside wedlock was not. If a pregnancy resulted from premarital sex, the young couple were expected to marry. Marriage and birth records from the late 1700s reveal that between 30 and 40 percent of New England brides were pregnant before marriage.

In the 1899 text Soul Laws in Sexual, Social, and Spiritual Life, F.S. Heath discussed premarital sex in relation to heredity, claiming that "children inherit the peculiarities of the parents in soul, mind, and body” though despite this, “every person, by putting forth an earnest effort to do so, and seeking the help of God, can always overcome all besetments.” Approximately 4,000 copies of the book were in print by 1902. Reflecting the prevailing attitude of the time, Heath noted:

Husbands and wives do well when they yield to every good impulse, and abandon themselves to love each other in the marriage bed. They should be thoughtful, intelligent, prayerful and pure in heart and mind, instead of lustful beasts. The natural result of being such when child-life commences is to impart such qualities to it, and thus bring many years of satisfaction and comfort to themselves in the work and associations with such a child. If filled with oratory, music, business, mathematics, literature, art, piety, honor, ambition, etc., such a nature would naturally be transmitted. If with selfishness, dishonesty, deception, beastliness, recklessness, unbelief, lust, devilishness, bad temper, jealousy, etc., a like character will naturally follow in the child. Parents can thus easily bring a lifetime curse to their child, and through it to themselves, their future descendants, and humanity.

In the same text, Heath wrote:

A girl commences an abandonment of soul when she allows any improprieties or familiarities. The greater the yielding, the greater the abandonment, until all is lost. One who never tastes liquor never becomes a drunkard; the girl that never allows any improprieties never falls. All improprieties give some one power over her. All men want pure, true women for wives. It is almost an unanswerable argument that whatever any unmarried woman will do with one man, she will do with any man who pleases her fancy. Hence, the more a woman compromises herself with any man, the more dangerous it becomes for him to think of asking her to share his life, if he is to have a happy one. Many a girl has lost a shrewd suitor, and has had to marry much less advantageously, because she permitted familiarities which she fondly hoped would win him. Men loathe the idea of marrying a girl who has been familiarly handled by others. The sure way to reserve one's self untarnished for the marriage altar, and compel all to acknowledge by the logic of facts that purity and honor are not bartered away at any price. Rakes almost invariably seek among women until they find one they can't seduce, and marry her because she compels their respect.

The growing prevalence of the automobile, and corresponding changes in dating practices, caused premarital sex to become more prevalent. Alfred Kinsey found that American women who became sexually mature during the 1920s were much less likely to be virgins at marriage than those who became mature before World War I. A majority of women during the 1920s under the age of 30 were nonetheless virgins at marriage, however, and half of those who were not only had sex with their fiancés. A 1938 survey of American college students found that 52% of men and 24% of women had had sex. 37% of women surveyed reported being virgins but believed sex outside marriage was acceptable. Prior to the middle of the 20th century, sexuality was generally constrained. Sexual interactions between people without plans to marry was considered unacceptable, with betrothal slightly lessening the stigma. However, premarital sex was still frowned upon.

Beginning in the 1950s, as premarital sex became more common, the stigma attached to it lessened for many people. In 1969, 70% of Americans disapproved of premarital sex, but by 1973 this number had dropped to 50%. By 2000, roughly a third of couples in the United States had lived together prior to marriage. During the second half of the twentieth century, premarital sex has remained steady for men, but 60% more women lost their virginity prior to marriage during this same period. This has altered the traditional nuclear family, with half of all children living with a single parent at some point in their life.

During this period of sexual liberation, sexual media and pornography became more prevalent and normalized premarital sex. People who watched pornography viewed both adult and teenage premarital sex as societally acceptable.

However, premarital sex was considered unacceptable by 30% of the population in a 2014 study, while 29% found it acceptable, and 36% considered it not a moral issue.

=== Poland ===
According to a 2021 Internet poll conducted for Wirtualna Polska, 23% of responders considered premarital sex a sin.

=== Russia ===
A VCIOM survey has shown that 34% of Russians do not accept sex before marriage, with 13% considering it always reprehensible.

== Studies ==
According to a 2004 peer-reviewed study published in the Journal of Marriage and Family found that women who have more than one premarital sexual relationship have a higher likelihood in the long run of disruptions if ever married, with this effect being the "strongest for women who have multiple premarital co-residential unions". Kahn and London (1991) found that premarital sex and divorce are positively correlated.

== See also ==
- Adultery
- Casual sex
- Cheating
- Fornication
- Free love
- Illegitimacy
- One night stand
- Religion and sexuality
- Shotgun wedding
- Single parent
- Trial marriage
