= Dyspareunia =

Pain during sexual intercourse

- Specialty: Gynecology Psychology Proctology
- Symptoms: pain during sexual intercourse, at the entrance or orifice or deeper inside
- Complications: anxiety, vaginismus
- Duration: temporary or chronic
- Prevention: psychologically and physically safe sexual partnerships; use of sexual lubrication for penetration; slower sexual pacing/"warming up;" better understanding of sexual anatomy of self/partners; open communication and trust with sexual partners
- Medication: none

Dyspareunia (/dɪspərˈuniə/ dis-pər-OO-nee-ə) is painful sexual intercourse. Although dyspareunia can occur in all human bodies, it is most commonly observed in women. It is unknown what percentage of people who engage in anal sex experience dyspareunia. All forms of dyspareunia can induce sexual anxiety, which can become chronic if left unresolved and can worsen dyspareunia.

In people with affected female sex organs, pain may primarily affect the external surface of the genitalia (the vulva or vagina), or may be deeper in the pelvis from pressure against the cervix. Dyspareunia can be a pelvic floor dysfunction that is mis- or underdiagnosed. In people with male sex organs affected, factors such as the shape of a penis, the tension of foreskin, cysts, or infections may cause or contribute to dyspareunia. Dyspareunia can occur in the anus as anodyspareunia. Understanding the duration, location, and nature of the pain is important in diagnosing the causes.

In 2020, dyspareunia was estimated to affect 35% of women worldwide at some point in their lives. Numerous physical, psychological, and social or relationship factors can contribute to pain during sexual encounters. Often, multiple underlying causes contribute to the pain. The pain can be acquired or congenital. Symptoms of dyspareunia may also occur after menopause.

Diagnosis is typically by physical examination and medical history. In each case, underlying causes determine treatment. Many patients achieve relief when physical causes are identified and treated.

== Signs and symptoms ==
Sexual penetration should not be painful. Dyspareunia caused by physical or emotional stressors can create chronic pain disorders that affect sexual health, such as vaginsmus, or it could be symptoms of underlying disease. If dyspareunia cannot be avoided with proper lubrication, slower pacing, and other healthy sexual partnership behaviors, a medical professional should be consulted to rule out disease.

Those who experience sexual pain during intercourse describe their pain in many ways. This reflects how many different and overlapping causes there are for dyspareunia. The location, nature, and time course of the pain help to understand potential causes and treatments.

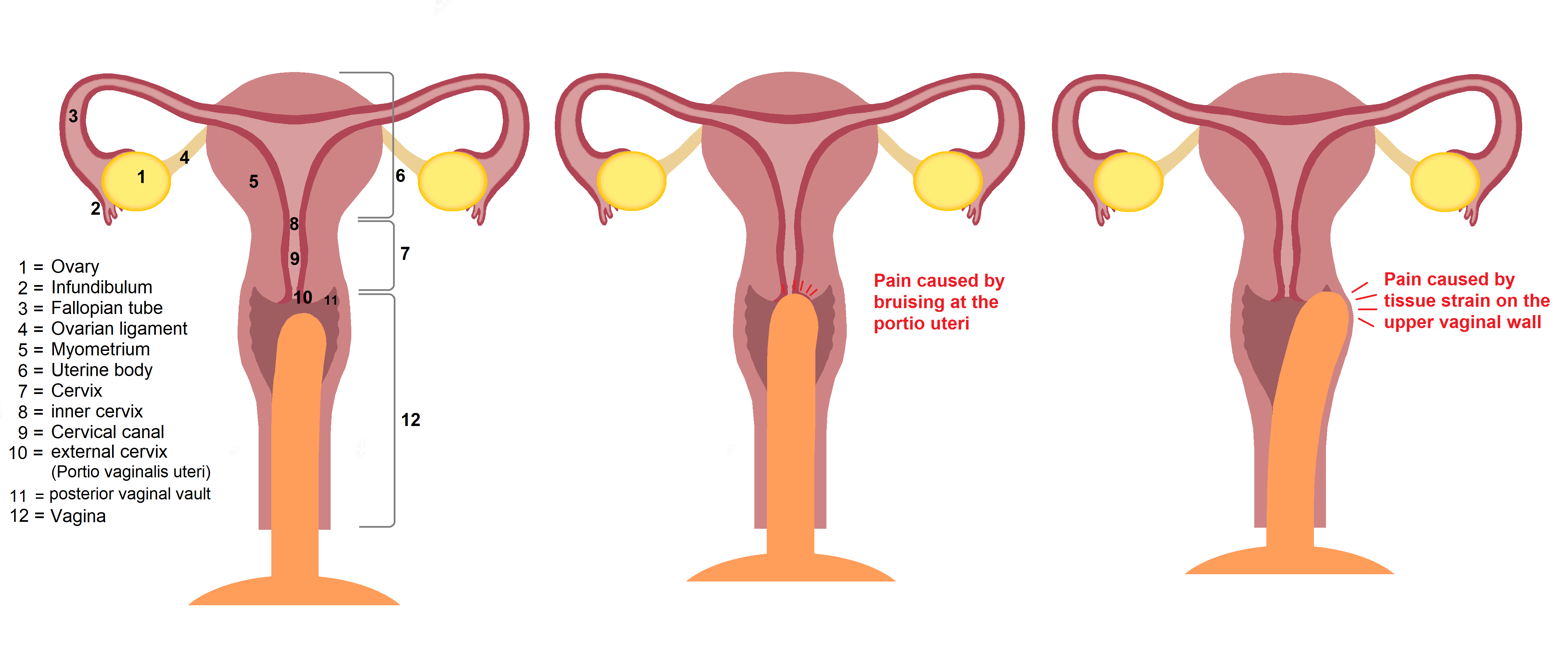
Pain due to a long penis or a small vagina

Some patients have always experienced pain with intercourse from their very first attempt, while others begin to feel pain with intercourse after an injury, infection, even or cyclically with menstruation. Some describe superficial pain at the opening or surface of the genitalia when penetration is initiated. Others feel deeper pain in the vault of the vagina, rectum, or deep within the pelvis upon deeper penetration. Some feel pain in more than one place.

Pain may distract from feeling pleasure and excitement. Both vaginal lubrication and vaginal dilation decrease, and the anus becomes more vulnerable to anal fissures. When the vagina is dry and undilated, penetration then becomes more painful. Anal fissures make anal penetration even more painful and greatly increase risk of infections.

Fear of being in pain can make the discomfort worse. Pain may persist after the original source is removed, due to the learned expectation of pain. Sometimes, psychology and behavior can be signs of chronic dyspareunia. Fear, avoidance, and psychological distress around attempting intercourse can become large parts of the experience.

== Causes ==
=== Dyspareunia in women ===
The cause of the pain may be anatomic or physiologic, including but not limited to lesions of the vagina, retroversion of the uterus, urinary tract infection, lack of lubrication, scar tissue, abnormal growths, or tender pelvic sites. Some cases may be psychosomatic, which can include fear of pain or injury, feelings of guilt or shame, ignorance of sexual anatomy and physiology, and fear of pregnancy.

Common causes for discomfort on vaginal penetration include:

1. Infections. Infections that mostly affect the labia, vagina, or lower urinary tract like yeast infections, chlamydia, trichomoniasis, urinary tract infections, or herpes tend to cause more superficial pain. Infections of the cervix, or fallopian tubes like pelvic inflammatory disease tend to cause deeper pain.
2. Cancer of the reproductive tract, including the ovaries, cervix, uterus, or vagina.
3. Tissue Injury. Pain after trauma to the pelvis from injury, surgery or childbirth.
4. Anatomic variations. Hymenal remnants, tight hymenal ring, vaginal septa, thickened undilatable hymen, hypoplasia of the introitus, retroverted uterus or uterine prolapse can contribute to discomfort.
5. Hormonal causes:
  - Endometriosis and adenomyosis
  - Estrogen deficiency is a particularly common cause of sexual pain complaints related to vaginal atrophy among postmenopausal patients, and may be a result of similar changes in menstruating patients on hormonal birth control. Estrogen deficiency is associated with lubrication inadequacy, which can lead to painful friction during intercourse. Vaginal dryness is often also reported alongside lactation. Patients undergoing radiation therapy for pelvic malignancy often experience severe dyspareunia due to the atrophy of the vaginal walls and their susceptibility to trauma.
6. Pelvic masses, including ovarian cysts, tumors, and uterine fibroids can cause deep pain.
7. Pain from bladder irritation: Dyspareunia is a symptom of interstitial cystitis (IC). Patients may struggle with bladder pain and discomfort during or after sex. For an IC patient with a penis, pain occurs at the moment of ejaculation and is focused at the tip of the penis. If the IC patient has a vagina, pain usually occurs the following day and is the result of painful, spasming pelvic floor muscles. Interstitial cystitis patients also struggle with urinary frequency and/or urinary urgency.
8. Vulvodynia: Vulvodynia is a diagnosis of exclusion involving either generalized or localized vulvar pain most often described as burning without physical evidence of other causes on exam. Pain can be constant or only when provoked (as with intercourse). Localized provoked vulvodynia is the most recent terminology for what used to be called vulvar vestibulitis when the pain is localized to the vaginal opening.
9. Conditions that affect the surface of the vulva including lichen sclerosus et atrophicus (LSEA), or xerosis (dryness, especially after the menopause). Vaginal dryness is sometimes seen in Sjögren's syndrome, an autoimmune disorder that characteristically attacks the exocrine glands that produce saliva and tears.
10. Muscular dysfunction: For example, levator ani myalgia
11. Psychological, such as vaginismus. Most vaginal pain disorders were officially discovered or coined during a time when rape was more normalized than it is now (marital rape was criminalized in all 50 US states only in 1993). Some in the medical community are now starting to take into account factors like rape, sexual assault, fear of rape, and sexual harassment as strong enough psychological stressors to cause such pain disorders.

=== Dyspareunia in men ===
There are a number of physical factors that may cause sexual discomfort. Pain is sometimes experienced in the testicular or glans area of the penis immediately after ejaculation. Infections of the prostate, bladder, or seminal vesicles can lead to intense burning or itching sensations following ejaculation. Patients with interstitial cystitis may experience intense penis pain at the moment of ejaculation. Gonorrheal infections are sometimes associated with burning or sharp penile pains during ejaculation. Urethritis or prostatitis can make genital stimulation painful or uncomfortable. Anatomic deformities of the penis, such as exist in Peyronie's disease, may also result in pain during coitus. One cause of painful intercourse is due to the painful retraction of a too-tight foreskin, occurring either during the first attempt at intercourse or subsequent to tightening or scarring following inflammation or local infection. Another cause of painful intercourse is due to tension in a short and slender frenulum, frenulum breve, as the foreskin retracts on entry to the vagina irrespective of lubrication. In one study frenulum breve was found in 50% of patients who presented with dyspareunia. During vigorous or deep or tight intercourse or masturbation, small tears may occur in the preputial frenulum and can bleed and be very painful and induce anxiety, which can become chronic if left unresolved. If gentle stretching exercises and steroid creams fail to ease the condition, and uncomfortable levels of tension remain, a frenuloplasty or preputioplasty procedure may be recommended. Frenuloplasty is an effective procedure, with a high chance of avoiding circumcision, giving good functional results and patient satisfaction. The psychological effects of these conditions, while little understood, are real, and are visible in literature and art.

== Diagnosis ==
=== Differential diagnosis ===
Dyspareunia is a condition that has many causes and is not a diagnosis of itself. It is combined with vaginismus into genito-pelvic pain/penetration disorder in the DSM-5 for the female sex organs. Criteria for genito-pelvic pain/penetration disorder include multiple episodes of difficulty with vaginal penetration, pain associated with intercourse attempts, anticipation of pain due to attempted intercourse, and tensing of the pelvis in response to attempted penetration. To meet criteria for this disorder, a patient must experience the symptoms for at least six months and experience "significant distress".

Physical examination of the vulva (external genitalia) may reveal clear reasons for pain including lesions, thin skin, ulcerations or discharge associated with vulvovaginal infections or vaginal atrophy. An internal pelvic exam may also reveal physical reasons for pain including lesions on the cervix or anatomic variation. Vulvar exams may also include cotton-swab tests for vulvodynia.

The differential diagnosis for dyspareunia is long because of its complicated and multifactorial nature. Often there are physiologic conditions underlying the pain, as well as psychosocial components that must be assessed to find appropriate treatment. A differential diagnosis of underlying physical causes can be guided by whether the pain is deep or superficial:

1. Superficial dyspareunia or vulvar pain: infection, inflammation, anatomic causes, tissue destruction, psychosocial factors, muscular dysfunction
2. Superficial dyspareunia without visible exam findings: When no other physical cause is found the diagnosis of vulvodynia should be considered. Vaginal atrophy may also not be seen clearly on exam but commonly affects postmenopausal patients and is generally associated with estrogen deficiency.
3. Deep dyspareunia or pelvic pain: endometriosis, ovarian cysts, pelvic adhesions, inflammatory diseases (interstitial cystitis, pelvic inflammatory disease), infections, congestion, psychosocial factors,

== Treatment ==
The treatment for pain with intercourse depends on what is causing the pain. After proper diagnosis one or more treatments for specific causes may be necessary.

For example:

- For pain due to yeast or fungal infections, a clinician may prescribe mycogen cream (nystatin and triamcinolone acetonide), which treats both a yeast infection and associated painful inflammation and itching because it contains both an antifungal and a steroid.
- For pain that is likely due to post-menopausal vaginal dryness, estrogen treatment can be used.
- For patients with diagnostic criteria for endometriosis, medications or surgery are possible options.

== History ==
=== Etymology ===
The word dyspareunia comes from Greek δυσ-, dys- 'bad' and πάρευνος, pareunos 'bedfellow', meaning 'badly mated'.

=== Classification ===
The previous Diagnostic and Statistical Manual of Mental Disorders, the DSM-IV, stated that the diagnosis of dyspareunia is made when the patient complains of recurrent or persistent genital pain before, during, or after sexual intercourse that is not caused exclusively by lack of lubrication or by vaginal spasm (vaginismus). After the text revision of the fourth edition of the DSM, a debate arose, with arguments to recategorize dyspareunia as a pain disorder instead of a sex disorder, with Charles Allen Moser, a physician, arguing for the removal of dyspareunia from the manual altogether. The most recent version, the DSM 5, has grouped dyspareunia under the diagnosis of Genito-Pelvic Pain/Penetration Disorder.

== See also ==
- Dysorgasmia
- Sexual headache
