= Virginity =

State of a person who has never engaged in sexual intercourse

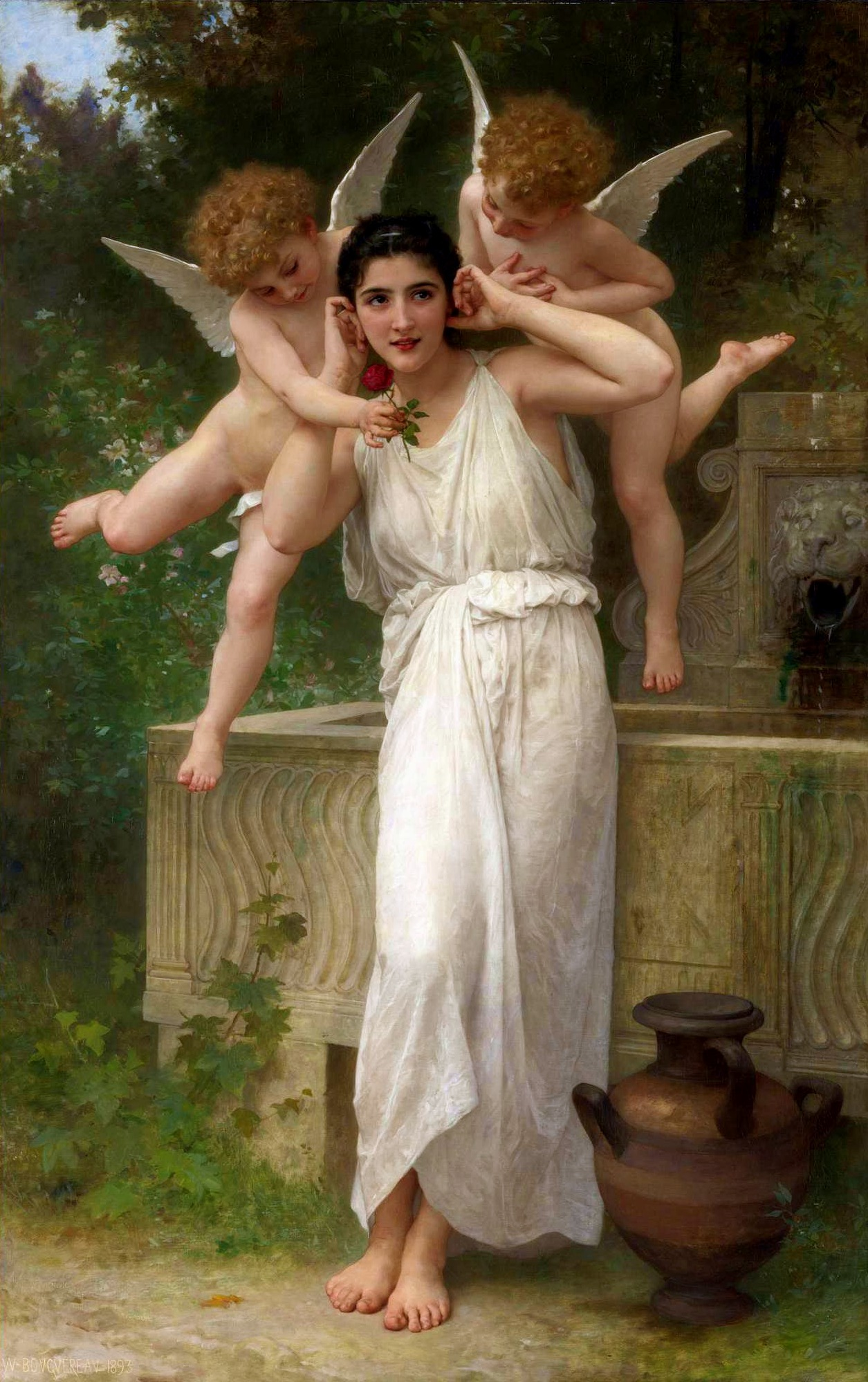
Youth (1893) by French painter William-Adolphe Bouguereau. The colour white has traditionally been associated with ritual purity, innocence, and virginity in Western cultures.

Virginity is a social construct that denotes the state of a person who has never engaged in sexual intercourse. As it is not an objective term with an operational definition, social definitions of what constitutes virginity, or the lack thereof, vary. Heterosexual individuals may or may not consider loss of virginity to occur only through penile–vaginal penetration, while people of other sexual orientations often include oral sex, anal sex, or manual sex in their definitions of virginity loss. The term "virgin" encompasses a range of definitions, as found in traditional, modern, and ethical concepts. Religious rituals for regaining virginity exist in many cultures. Some men and women who practice celibacy after losing their virginity consider themselves born-again virgins.

There are cultural and religious traditions that place special value and significance on this state, predominantly towards unmarried females, associated with notions of personal purity, honour, and worth. Like chastity, the concept of virginity has traditionally involved sexual abstinence. The concept of virginity usually involves moral or religious issues and can have consequences in terms of social status and in interpersonal relationships. Although virginity has social implications and had significant legal implications in some societies in the past, it has no legal consequences in most modern societies. The social implications of virginity persist in many societies and can have varying effects on an individual's social agency.

== Etymology ==
The word virgin comes via Old French virgine from the root form of Latin virgo, genitive virginis, meaning literally "maiden" or "virgin" The words virgino ("female virgin") and virgulo (literally "virgin person" but often used for a male virgin) are hyponyms.

The Latin word likely arose by analogy with a suit of lexemes based on vireo, meaning "to be green, fresh or flourishing", mostly with botanic reference—in particular, virga meaning "strip of wood".

The first known use of virgin in English is found in a Middle English manuscript held at Trinity College, Cambridge of about 1200:

Ðar haueð ... martirs, and confessors, and uirgines maked faier bode inne to women.

In this, and many later contexts, the reference is specifically Christian, alluding to members of the Ordo Virginum (Order of Virgins), which applies to the consecrated virgins known to have existed since the early church from the writings of the Church Fathers.

By about 1300, the word was expanded to apply also to Mary, the mother of Jesus, hence to sexual virginity explicitly:

Conceiud o þe hali gast, born o þe virgine marie.

Further expansion of the word to include virtuous (or naïve) young women, irrespective of religious connection, occurred over about another century, until by about 1400 it was found:

Voide & vacand of vices as virgyns it ware.

In modern English, virgin is not restricted to youth or females; older women can be virgins (the Virgin Queen), men can be virgins, and potential initiates into many fields can be colloquially termed virgins—for example, a skydiving "virgin". In the latter usage, virgin means uninitiated, as in the much older virgin knight. "Virgin" is also used as an adjective in terms like virgin field.

== Culture ==
=== Concept ===
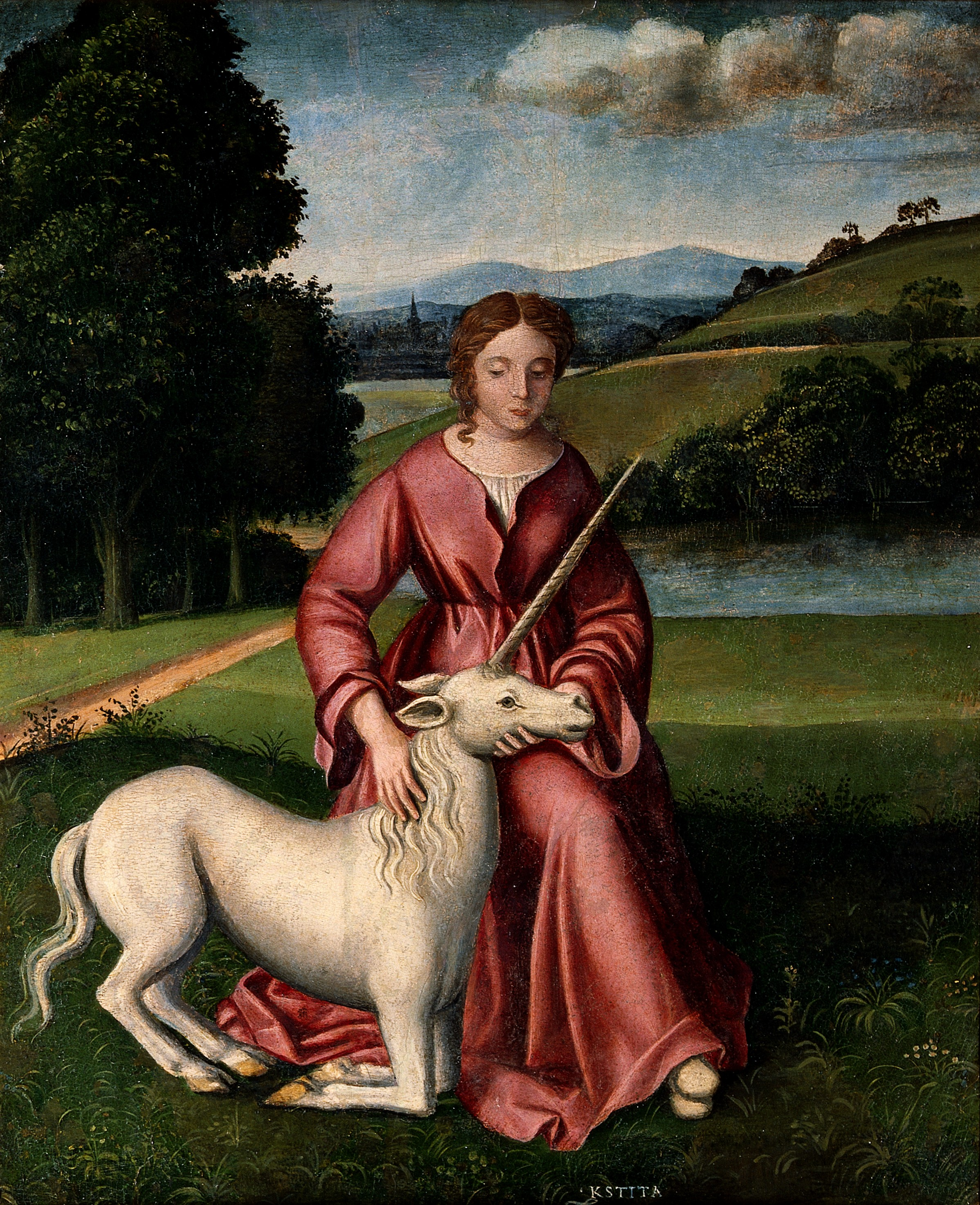
A virgin and a unicorn, oil painting by an anonymous painter, ca. 1500

The concept of virginity has significance only in a particular social, cultural or moral context. According to Hanne Blank, "virginity reflects no known biological imperative and grants no demonstrable evolutionary advantage."

Medieval bestiaries stated that the only way to capture or tame a unicorn was by way of using a virgin as a lure, due to her implied purity. The topic is popular in Renaissance paintings.

Although virginity has historically been correlated with purity and worth, many feminist scholars believe that virginity itself is a myth. They argue that no standardized medical definition of virginity exists, that there is no scientifically verifiable proof of virginity loss, and that sexual intercourse results in no change in personality. Jessica Valenti, feminist writer and author of The Purity Myth, reasons that the concept of virginity is also dubious because of the many individual definitions of virginity loss, and that valuing virginity has placed a woman's morality "between her legs." She critiques the notion that sexual activity has any influence on morality or ethics.

The urge of wanting one's spouse or partner to have never engaged in sexual activities is called a virgin complex. A person may also have a virgin complex directed towards oneself.

=== Definitions of virginity loss ===
There are varying understandings as to which types of sexual activities result in loss of virginity. The traditional view is that virginity is only lost through vaginal penetration by the penis, consensual or non-consensual, and that acts of oral sex, anal sex, manual sex or other forms of non-penetrative sex do not result in loss of virginity. A person who engages in such acts without having engaged in vaginal intercourse is often regarded among heterosexuals and researchers as "technically a virgin". By contrast, gay or lesbian individuals often describe such acts as resulting in loss of virginity. Some gay males regard penile-anal penetration as resulting in loss of virginity, but not fellatio, handjobs or other types of non-penetrative sex, while lesbians may regard cunnilingus or fingering as virginity loss. Some lesbians who debate the traditional definition consider whether or not non-penile forms of vaginal penetration constitute virginity loss, while other gay men and lesbians assert that the term virginity is meaningless to them because of the prevalence of the traditional definition.

Whether a person can lose their virginity through rape is also subject to debate, with the belief that virginity can only be lost through consensual sex being prevalent in some studies. In a study by researcher and author Laura M. Carpenter, many men and women discussed how they felt virginity could not be taken through rape.

Carpenter states that despite perceptions of what determines virginity loss being as varied among gay men and lesbians as they are among heterosexuals, and in some cases more varied among the former, that the matter has been described to her as people viewing sexual acts relating to virginity loss as "acts that correspond to your sexual orientation," which suggests the following: "So if you're a gay male, you're supposed to have anal sex because that's what gay men do. And if you're a gay woman, then you're supposed to have oral sex, because that's what gay women do. And so those become, like markers, for when virginity is lost."

The concept of "technical virginity" or sexual abstinence through oral sex is popular among teenagers. For example, oral sex is common among adolescent girls who fellate their boyfriends not only to preserve their virginity, but also to create and maintain intimacy or to avoid pregnancy. In a 1999 study published in JAMA (the Journal of the American Medical Association), the definition of "sex" was examined based on a 1991 random sample of 599 college students from 29 US states; it found that 60% said oral-genital contact (like fellatio, cunnilingus) did not constitute having sex. Stephanie Sanders of the Kinsey Institute, co-author of the study, stated, "That's the 'technical virginity' thing that's going on." She and other researchers titled their findings "Would You Say You 'Had Sex' If ...?". By contrast, in a study released in 2008 by the Guttmacher Institute, author of the findings Laura Lindberg stated that there "is a widespread belief that teens engage in nonvaginal forms of sex, especially oral sex, as a way to be sexually active while still claiming that technically, they are virgins", but that her study drew the conclusion that "research shows that this supposed substitution of oral sex for vaginal sex is largely a myth".

A 2003 study published in the Canadian Journal of Human Sexuality focusing on definitions of "having sex" and noting studies concerning university students from the United States, the United Kingdom, and Australia reported that "[w]hile the vast majority of respondents (more than 97%) in these three studies included penile-vaginal intercourse in their definition of sex, fewer (between 70% and 90%) respondents considered penile-anal intercourse to constitute having sex" and that "oral-genital behaviours were defined as sex by between 32% and 58% of respondents". A different study by the Kinsey Institute sampled 484 people, ranging in ages 18–96. "Nearly 95 percent of people in the study agreed that penile-vaginal intercourse meant 'had sex.' But the numbers changed as the questions got more specific." 11 percent of respondents based "had sex" on whether the man had achieved an orgasm, concluding that absence of an orgasm does not constitute "having had" sex. "About 80 percent of respondents said penile-anal intercourse meant 'had sex.' About 70 percent of people believed oral sex was sex."

Virginity pledges (or abstinence pledges) made by heterosexual teenagers and young adults may also include the practice of "technical virginity". In a peer-reviewed study by sociologists Peter Bearman and Hannah Brueckner, which looked at virginity pledgers five years after their pledge, they found that the pledgers have similar proportions of sexually transmitted diseases (STDs) and at least as high proportions of anal and oral sex as those who have not made a virginity pledge, and deduced that there was substitution of oral and anal sex for vaginal sex among the pledgers. However, the data for anal sex without vaginal sex reported by males did not reflect this directly.

=== Early loss of virginity ===
Early loss of virginity has been shown to be linked to factors such as level of education, independence, biological factors like age and gender, and social factors such as parental supervision or religious affiliation, with the most common being sociodemographic variables. Along with this, sexual abuse has also been shown to have a link to later risky sexual behaviors and a younger age of voluntary sexual intercourse. Sexual initiation at an earlier age has been associated with reduced frequency of condom use, less satisfaction and more frequency of non-autonomous reasons for that first sexual encounter. Adverse effects for losing virginity at an early age include lower chance of economic stability, lower level of education, social isolation, marital disruption and greater medical consequences. These medical consequences consist of an increase in STDs, cervical cancer, pelvic inflammatory disease, fertility and unwanted pregnancies.

=== Female virginity ===
==== Cultural value ====
The first act of sexual intercourse by a female is commonly considered within many cultures to be an important personal milestone. Its significance is reflected in expressions such as "saving oneself", "losing one's virginity," "taking someone's virginity" and sometimes as "deflowering". The occasion is at times seen as the end of innocence, integrity, or purity, and the sexualization of the individual.

Traditionally, there was a cultural expectation that a female would not engage in premarital sex and would come to her wedding a virgin and that she would "give up" her virginity to her new husband in the act of consummation of the marriage. Feminine sexual practices have revolved around the idea of females waiting to have sex until they are married.

Some females who have been previously sexually active (or their hymen has been otherwise damaged) may undergo a surgical procedure, called hymenorrhaphy or hymenoplasty, to repair or replace her hymen, and cause vaginal bleeding on the next intercourse as proof of virginity (see below). In some cultures, an unmarried female who is found not to be a virgin, whether by choice or as a result of a rape, can be subject to shame, ostracism or even an honor killing. In those cultures, female virginity is closely interwoven with personal or even family honor, especially those known as shame societies, in which the loss of virginity before marriage is a matter of deep shame. In some parts of Africa, the myth that sex with a virgin can cure HIV/AIDS continues to prevail, leading to girls and women being raped. In other societies, such as many modern-day Western cultures, lack of sexual abstinence before marriage is not as socially stigmatized as it may be in the formerly mentioned cultures. Conversely, Western societies see premarital abstinence as prudish or outdated, while encouraging and sometimes even pressuring virgin individuals into sexual encounters.

Virginity is regarded as a valuable commodity in some cultures. In the past, within most societies a woman's options for marriage were largely dependent upon her status as a virgin. Those women who were not virgins experienced a dramatic decrease in opportunities for a socially advantageous marriage, and in some instances the premarital loss of virginity eliminated their chances of marriage entirely. Modern virginity auctions, like that of Natalie Dylan, are discussed in the 2013 documentary How to Lose Your Virginity.

The Bible required a man who had sex with a virgin to pay her bride price to her father and marry the girl. In some countries, until the late 20th century, a woman could sue a man who had taken her virginity but did not marry her. In some languages, the compensation for these damages are called "wreath money".

==== "Proof of virginity" ====
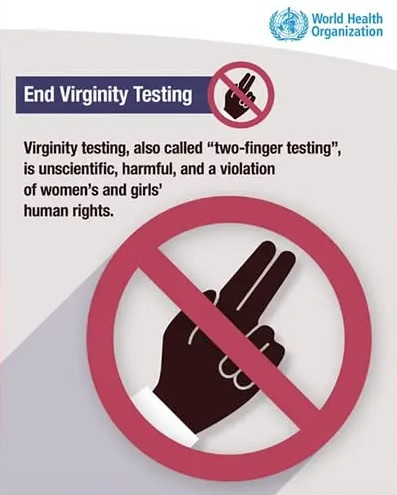
World Health Organization poster against virginity testing

Despite common cultural beliefs, links between hymen state and vaginal penetration are not clear-cut. Inserting objects (including penises) into the vagina may or may not affect the hymen. The state of a hymen cannot be used to prove or disprove virginity. Penile penetration does not lead to predictable changes to female genital organs; after puberty, hymens are highly elastic and can stretch during penetration without trace of injury. Females with a confirmed history of sexual abuse involving genital penetration may have normal hymens. Young females who say they have had consensual sex mostly show no identifiable changes in the hymen. Hymens rarely completely cover the vagina, hymens naturally have irregularities in width, and hymens can heal spontaneously without scarring. Visible breaks in the hymen, including complete hymenal clefts, are also common in girls and women who have never been sexually active.

Medical professionals therefore recommend against describing hymens as "intact" or "broken".

Some cultures require proof of a bride's virginity before her marriage. This has traditionally been tested by inspection for an "intact" hymen, or by a "proof of blood", which refers to vaginal bleeding wrongly believed to be caused by the tearing of the hymen after the first sanctioned sexual contact. Coerced medical virginity tests are practiced in many regions of the world, but are today condemned as a form of abuse of women. According to the World Health Organization (WHO): "Sexual violence encompasses a wide range of acts including (...) violent acts against the sexual integrity of women, including female genital mutilation and obligatory inspections for virginity".

Although it is not actually possible to determine virginity by inspection, some doctors feel socially pressured into performing "virginity testing" inspections and providing "certificates of virginity". In some jurisdictions, this is illegal, and physicians are encouraged to instead provide education, guidance, social support, and where needed, physical protection. Such virginity-testing bans have been controversial; while there is a consensus that virginity cannot be scientifically and medically certified, some physicians argue that certificates, while intrinsically dishonest, protect vulnerable women from potentially life-threatening danger.

Some women undergo hymenorrhaphy (or hymenoplasty) to reshape their hymens with the intent of causing vaginal bleeding on the next intercourse. Hymenorraphy is based on the false belief that all women bleed when first having vaginal intercourse; in fact, only about half bleed. In some cultures, the nuptial blood-spotted bed sheet would be displayed as proof of both consummation of marriage and that the bride had been a virgin. Hymens have few blood vessels and may not bleed significantly even when torn, and vaginal walls may bleed significantly when torn. Blood on the sheets on first intercourse is more likely to be due to lacerations to the vaginal wall caused by inadequate vaginal lubrication or forced penetration. A small study found that of 19 women who underwent hymenorrhaphy, 17 did not have bleeding at the next intercourse.

In Iran, Grand Ayatollah Sayyid Sadeq Rohani has issued a fatwa which states that a women, after undergoing hymenorrhaphy, is a virgin, and a man cannot divorce her on grounds that she was not. Hymenorraphy is considered a form of cosmetic surgery, and is not generally accepted, taught, or regulated by the medical profession.

There is a common belief that some women are born without a hymen, but some doubt has been cast on this by a recent study. It is likely that almost all women are born with a hymen, but most will not experience a measurable change during first experience of vaginal intercourse. Some medical procedures occasionally may require a woman's hymen to be opened (hymenotomy).

=== Male virginity ===
Historically, and in modern times, female virginity has been regarded as more significant than male virginity; the perception that sexual prowess is fundamental to masculinity has lowered the expectation of male virginity without lowering social status. For example, in Mataram, Indonesia, where around 80% of the population are Muslims, unmarried women who are not virgins may be subject to name-calling, shunning, or family shame, while unmarried men who have lost their virginities are not, though premarital sex is forbidden in the Quran with regard to both men and women. Among various countries or cultures, males are expected or encouraged to want to engage in sexual activity, and to be more sexually experienced. Not following these standards often leads to teasing and other such ridicule from their male peers. A 2003 study by the Guttmacher Institute showed that in the countries surveyed, most men have experienced sexual intercourse by their 20th birthdays.

Male sexuality is seen as something that is innate and competitive and displays a different set of cultural values and stigmas from female sexuality and virginity. In one study, scholars Wenger and Berger found that male virginity is understood to be real by society, but it has been ignored by sociological studies. Within British and American culture in particular, male virginity has been made an object of embarrassment and ridicule in films such as Summer of '42, American Pie, The Inbetweeners Movie and The 40-Year-Old Virgin, with the male virgin typically being presented as socially inept. Such attitudes have resulted in some men keeping their status as a virgin a secret.

=== Prevalence of virginity ===
Prevalence of sexually experienced 15-year-olds based on self-reports
Country	Boys (%)	Girls (%)
Austria	21.7	17.9
Canada	24.1	23.9
Croatia	21.9	8.2
England	34.9	39.9
Estonia	18.8	14.1
Finland	23.1	32.7
Flanders	24.6	23
France	25.1	17.7
Greece	32.5	9.5
Hungary	25	16.3
Israel	31	8.2
Latvia	19.2	12.4
Lithuania	24.4	9.2
Macedonia	34.2	2.7
Netherlands	23.3	20.5
Poland	20.5	9.3
Portugal	29.2	19.1
Scotland	32.1	34.1
Slovenia	28.2	20.1
Spain	17.2	13.9
Sweden	24.6	29.9
Switzerland	24.1	20.3
Ukraine	47.1	24
Wales	27.3	38.5

The prevalence of virginity varies from culture to culture. In cultures which place importance on a female's virginity at marriage, the age at which virginity is lost is in effect determined by the age at which marriages would normally take place in those cultures, as well as the minimum marriage age set by the laws of the country where the marriage takes place.

In a cross-cultural study, At what age do women and men have their first sexual intercourse? (2003), Michael Bozon of the French Institut national d'études démographiques found that contemporary cultures fall into three broad categories. In the first group, the data indicated families arranging marriage for daughters as close to puberty as possible with significantly older men. Age of men at sexual initiation in these societies is at later ages than that of women, but is often extra-marital. This group included sub-Saharan Africa (the study listed Mali, Senegal and Ethiopia). The study considered the Indian subcontinent to also fall into this group, although data was only available from Nepal.

In the second group, the data indicated families encouraged daughters to delay marriage, and to abstain from sexual activity before that time. However, sons are encouraged to gain experience with older women or prostitutes before marriage. Age of men at sexual initiation in these societies is at lower ages than that of women. This group includes Latin cultures, both from southern Europe (Portugal, Greece and Romania are noted) and from Latin America (Brazil, Chile, and the Dominican Republic). The study considered many Asian societies to also fall into this group, although matching data was only available from Thailand.

In the third group, age of men and women at sexual initiation was more closely matched. There were two sub-groups, however. In non-Latin, Catholic countries (Poland and Lithuania are mentioned), age at sexual initiation was higher, suggesting later marriage and reciprocal valuing of male and female virginity. The same pattern of late marriage and reciprocal valuing of virginity was reflected in Singapore and Sri Lanka. The study considered China and Vietnam to also fall into this group, although data were not available.

Finally, in northern and eastern European countries, age at sexual initiation was lower, with both men and women involved in sexual activity before any union formation. The study listed Switzerland, Germany and the Czech Republic as members of this group.

According to a 2001 UNICEF survey, in 10 out of 12 developed nations with available data, more than two thirds of young people have had sexual intercourse while still in their teens. In Australia, the United Kingdom and the United States, approximately 25% of 15-year-olds and 50% of 17-year-olds have had sex. A 2002 international survey sought to study the sexual behavior of teenagers. 33,943 students aged 15, from 24 countries, completed a self-administered, anonymous, classroom survey, consisting of a standard questionnaire, developed by the HBSC (Health Behaviour in School-aged Children) international research network. The survey revealed that the majority of the students were still virgins (they had no experience of sexual intercourse), and, among those who were sexually active, the majority (82%) used contraception. In a 2005 Kaiser Family Foundation study of US teenagers, 29% of teens reported feeling pressure to have sex, 33% of sexually active teens reported "being in a relationship where they felt things were moving too fast sexually", and 24% had "done something sexual they didn't really want to do". Several polls have indicated peer pressure as a factor in encouraging both girls and boys to have sex.

Some studies suggest that people commence sexual activity at an earlier age than previous generations. The 2005 Durex Global sex survey found that people worldwide are having sex for the first time at an average age of 17.3, ranging from 15.6 in Iceland to 19.8 in India (though evidence has shown that the average age is not a good indicator of sexual initiation, and that percentages of sexually initiated youth at each age are preferred). A 2008 survey of UK teenagers between the ages of 14 and 17 (conducted by YouGov for Channel 4), showed that only 6% of these teenagers intended to wait until marriage before having sex. According to a 2011 CDC study, in the 15-to-19-year-old age group 43 percent of males and 48 percent of females in the United States reported never having an opposite-sex partner.

The rates of teenage pregnancy vary and range from 143 per 1000 girls in some sub-Saharan African countries to 2.9 per 1000 in South Korea. The rate for the United States is 52.1 per 1000, the highest in the developed world – and about four times the European Union average. The teenage pregnancy rates between countries must take into account the level of general sex education available and access to contraceptive options. Many Western countries have instituted sex education programs, the main objective of which is to reduce such pregnancies and STDs. In 1996, the United States federal government shifted the objective of sex education towards "abstinence-only sex education" programs, promoting sexual abstinence before marriage (i.e., virginity) and prohibiting information on birth control and contraception. In 2004, President George W. Bush announced a Five-Year Global HIV/AIDS Strategy, also known as the President's Emergency Plan for AIDS Relief (PEPFAR), which committed the U.S. to provide $15 billion over five years toward AIDS relief in 15 countries in Africa and the Caribbean, and in Vietnam. A part of the funding was earmarked specifically for "abstinence-only-until-marriage" programs.

In one study about virginity pledges, male pledgers were 4.1 times more likely to remain virgins by age 25 than those who did not pledge (25% vs 6%), and estimated that female pledgers were 3.5 times more likely to remain virgins by age 25 than those who did not pledge (21% vs 6%).

=== Social psychology ===
Some cultural anthropologists argue that romantic love and sexual jealousy are universal features of human relationships. Social values related to virginity reflect both sexual jealousy and ideals of romantic love, and appear to be deeply embedded in human nature.

Psychology explores the connection between thought and behavior. Seeking understanding of social (or anti-social) behaviors includes sexual behavior. Joan Kahn and Kathryn London studied U.S. women married between 1965 and 1985 to see if virginity at marriage influenced risk of divorce. In this study, women who were virgins at the time of marriage were shown to have less marital upset. It was shown that when observable characteristics were controlled, women who were non-virgins at the time of marriage had a higher risk for divorce. However, it was also shown that the link between premarital sex and the risk of divorce were attributed to prior unobserved differences, such as deviating from norms.

A study conducted by Smith and Schaffer found that someone's first sexual experience has been linked to their sexual performance for years to come. Participants whose first intercourse was pleasant showed more satisfaction in their current sex lives. A different study showed that when compared with virgins, nonvirgins have been shown to have higher levels of independence, less desire for achievement, more criticism from society and a greater level of deviance.

== Ethics ==
=== Social norms and legal implications ===
Human sexual activity, like many other kinds of activity engaged in by humans, is generally influenced by social rules that are culturally specific and vary widely. These social rules are referred to as sexual morality (what can and can not be done by society's rules) and sexual norms (what is and is not expected). There are a number of groups within societies promoting their views of sexual morality in a variety of ways, including through sex education, religious teachings, seeking commitments or virginity pledges, and other means.

Most countries have laws which set a minimum marriage age, with the most common age being 18 years, reduced to 16 in "special circumstances", typically when the female partner is pregnant, but the actual age at first marriage can be considerably higher. Laws also prescribe the minimum age at which a person is permitted to engage in sex, commonly called the age of consent. Social (and legal) attitudes toward the appropriate age of consent have drifted upwards in modern times. For example, while ages from 10 to 13 were typically acceptable in Western countries during the mid-19th century, the end of the 19th century and the beginning of the 20th century were marked by changing attitudes resulting in raising the ages of consent to ages generally ranging from 16 to 18. Today, the age of consent varies from 12 years (or onset of puberty) to 21, but 16 is the most common age of consent, though some jurisdictions also have a "close-in-age" exception or "Romeo and Juliet law", allowing two adolescents (as young as 12 years of age) to have sex with each other provided their ages are not more than a specified number of years apart (typically no more than a 2 to 3 years age difference, depending on the jurisdiction). Some countries outlaw any sex outside marriage entirely.

Historically, and still in many countries and jurisdictions today, a female's sexual experience is sometimes considered a relevant factor in the prosecution of a perpetrator of rape. Also, historically, a man who "took" a female's virginity could be forced to marry her. In addition, children born as a result of premarital sex were subject to various legal and social disabilities such as being considered illegitimate and thus barred from inheriting from the putative father's estate, from bearing the father's surname or title, and support from the putative father. Many of these legal disabilities on children born from extramarital relationships have been abolished by law in most Western countries, though social ostracism may still apply.

=== Religious views ===
All major religions have moral codes covering issues of sexuality, morality, and ethics. Though these moral codes do not address issues of sexuality directly, they seek to regulate the situations which can give rise to sexual interest and to influence people's sexual activities and practices. However, the impact of religious teaching has at times been limited. For example, though most religions disapprove of premarital sexual relations, it has always been widely practiced. Nevertheless, these religious codes have always had a strong influence on peoples' attitudes to sexual issues.

==== Ancient Greece and Rome ====
Virginity was often considered a virtue denoting purity and physical self-restraint and is an important characteristic in Greek mythology.

In ancient Greek literature such as the Homeric Hymns, there are references to the Parthenon goddesses Artemis, Athena, and Hestia proclaiming pledges to eternal virginity (Greek: παρθενία). However, it has been argued a maiden's state of parthenia (Greek: παρθένος), as invoked by these deities, carries a slightly different meaning from what is normally understood as virginity in modern western religions.^{[15]} Rather, parthenia focused more on marriageability and abstract concepts without strict physical requirements which would be adversely affected, but not entirely relinquished, by pre-marital sexual intercourse. For these reasons, other goddesses not eternally committed to parthenia within the Homeric Hymns are able to renew theirs through ritual (such as Hera) or choose an appearance which implies the possession of it (such as Aphrodite). Although accounts vary, the goddess of witchcraft known as Hecate has been portrayed as a virgin as well.

In Roman times, the Vestal Virgins were the highly respected, strictly celibate (although not necessarily virginal) priestesses of Vesta, and keepers of the sacred fire of Vesta. The Vestals were committed to the priesthood before puberty (when 6–10 years old) and sworn to celibacy for a period of 30 years. The chastity of the Vestals was considered to have a direct bearing on the health of the Roman state. Allowing the sacred fire of Vesta to die out, suggesting that the goddess had withdrawn her protection from the city, was a serious offence and was punishable by scourging. Because a Vestal's chastity was thought to be directly correlated to the sacred burning of the fire, if the fire were extinguished it might be assumed that a Vestal had been unchaste. The penalty for a Vestal Virgin found to have had sexual relations while in office was being buried alive.

==== Buddhism ====
The most common formulation of Buddhist ethics for lay followers are the Five Precepts and the Eightfold Path. These precepts take the form of voluntary, personal undertakings, not divine mandate or instruction. The third of the Five Precepts is "To refrain from committing sensual misconduct". Sensual misconduct is defined in the Pali Canon as follows:

Abandoning sensual misconduct, [a man] abstains from sensual misconduct. He does not get sexually involved with those who are protected by their mothers, their fathers, their brothers, their sisters, their relatives, or their Dhamma; those with husbands, those who entail punishments, or even those crowned with flowers by another man.

Virginity, specifically, is not mentioned in the Canon. On the other hand, Buddhist monks and nuns of most traditions are expected to refrain from all sexual activity and the Buddha is said to have admonished his followers to avoid unchastity "as if it were a pit of burning cinders."

The 3rd of the 5 precepts in Buddhism warns against any sensual misconduct, though the exact definition of it is unclear. Buddhists have been more open compared to other religions about the subject of sex and that has expanded over time. As with Christianity, although a traditionalist would assume that one should not have sex before marriage, many Buddhists do. There are different branches of Buddhism, like tantric and puritan, and they have very different views on the subject of sex, yet managed to get along. Tantric is a Sanskrit word; it is typically translated as two things or person being bound together. In the time of Gotama, the man who came to be known as Buddha, sex was not taboo. The world the prince lived in was filled with earthly pleasures. Women naked from the waist above were in the court solely to serve the prince. Gotama's father even constructed a chamber of love. Prince Gotama and founded the beginnings of Buddhism, which included the denial of earthly pleasures in order to follow the Middle Way. The stark contrast between the way Buddha lived his life before and after rejecting the material world may arguably be one of the reasons Buddhism evolved the way it did. In the present, the mother of a Buddha does not have to be a virgin; she must have never had a child, however.

==== Hinduism ====
In Hinduism, premarital virginity on the part of the bride is considered ideal. The prevailing Hindu marriage ceremony, or the Vedic wedding, centers around the Kanyadan ritual, which literally means gift of a virgin, by father of the maiden through which the Hindus believe they gain greatest spiritual merit, and marriages of the daughters are considered a spiritual obligation. The purity of women is especially valued in South Asia, where Hinduism is most commonly practiced. Sex had never been a taboo in ancient India and intactness of the hymen had nothing to do with virginity.

==== Judaism ====
Premarital sex is forbidden in Judaism. In fact, the precedent for the mitzvot which are related in Deuteronomy 22:25-29, which regard what happens when a man rapes a virgin, may well have been set at Shechem after the rape of Dinah (cf. Genesis 34).

There are other references in the Torah to virginity. In the first reference, in Genesis 19:8, Lot offers his virgin daughters to the people of Sodom for sexual purposes in an attempt to protect his guests (cf. Genesis 19:4-11), with the implication that the people of Sodom would be more likely to accept the offer in view of the girls' virginity than they would otherwise. This also sets the precedent for Israelites to avoid homosexual activity (cf. Leviticus 18:22, 20:13.).

The next reference is at Genesis 24:16, where Eliezer is seeking a wife for his master, Abraham's son. He meets Rebecca, and the narrative tells us, "the damsel was very fair to look upon, a virgin, neither had any man known her" (in biblical terms, "to know" is a euphemism for sexual relations).

Children born to a single woman are not regarded as illegitimate (a mamzer) or subject to social or religious disabilities—Perez and Zerach, for example (and although their mother was a widow who was willingly impregnated by her father-in-law), were not counted as mamzerim (cf. Genesis 38:24-30).

Halakhah also contains rules related to protecting female virgins, and rules regarding pre-marital sex, rape, and the effects of each.

In Torah, a damsel who has not the sign of virginity in the early marriage shall be punished by death penalty, since the unvirgin woman among Israel is equal with a defiled whore in her father's house.

==== Christianity ====
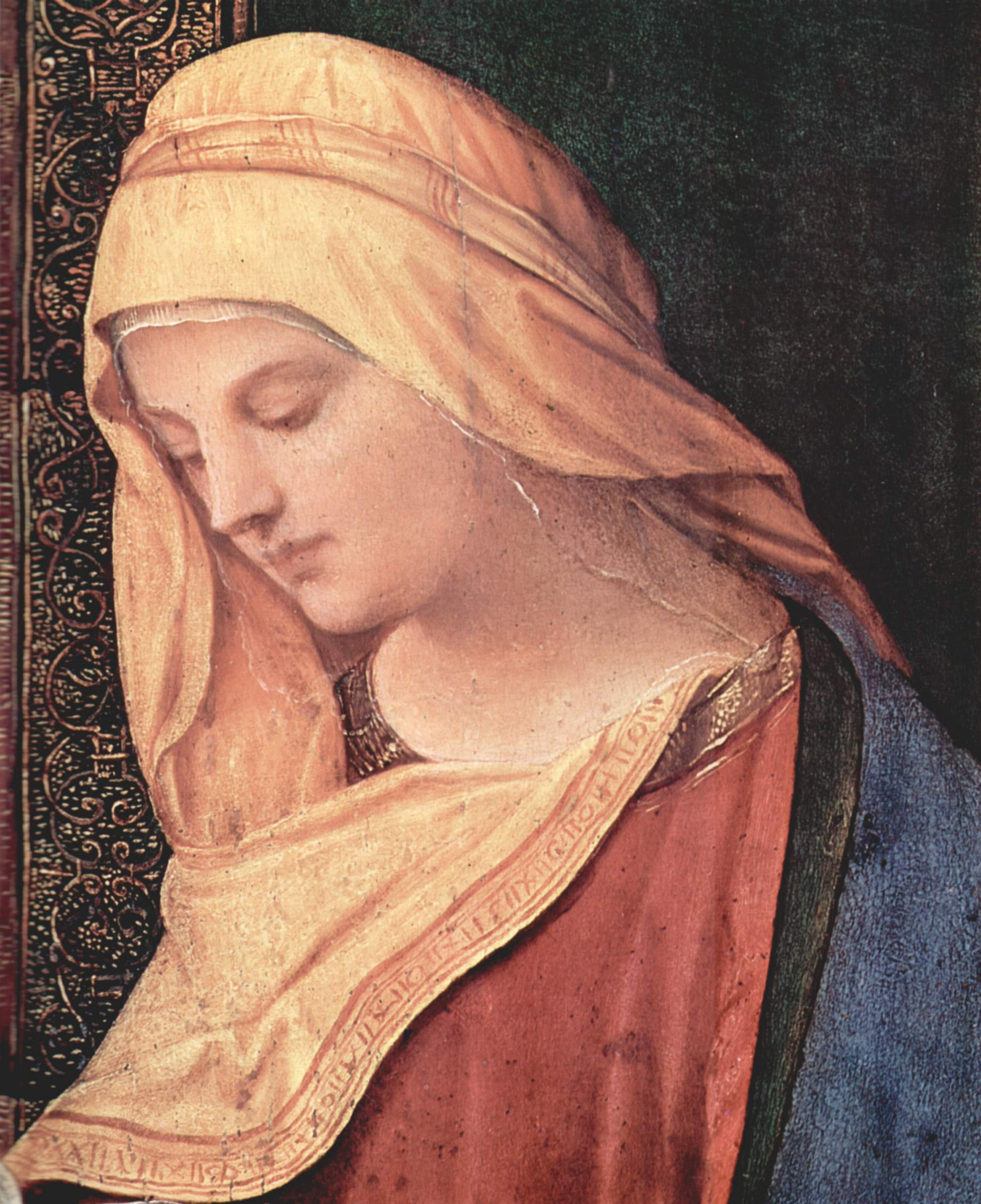
Detail of The Reading Madonna by Giorgione (c. 1500)

Paul the Apostle expressed the view that a person's body belongs to God and is God's temple (1 Corinthians 6:13, 3:16), and that premarital sex is immoral (1 Corinthians 6:18) on an equal level as adultery. (1 Corinthians 6:9) Paul also expressed the view in 1 Corinthians 7:1–7 that sexual abstinence is the preferred state for both men and women. However, he stated that sexual relations are expected between a married couple.

According to classicist Evelyn Stagg and New Testament scholar Frank Stagg, the New Testament holds that sex is reserved for marriage. Harold Gentry wrote that "It is intended by God for the husband to be the one to break his wife's hymen", which when perforated during the consummation of marriage creates a blood covenant that seals the bond of holy matrimony between husband and wife. Stagg maintains that the New Testament teaches that sex outside of marriage is a sin of adultery if either of the participants is married, otherwise the sin of fornication if neither of the participants are married. An imperative given in 1 Corinthians says, "Flee from sexual immorality. All other sins people commit are outside their bodies, but those who sin sexually sin against their own bodies." Those who are sexually immoral or adulterers are listed in 1 Corinthians 6:9 in a list of "wrongdoers who ... will not inherit the kingdom of God." Galatians 5:19 and 1 Corinthians 7:2 also address fornication. The Apostolic Decree of the Council of Jerusalem also includes a prohibition on fornication.

Aquinas went further, emphasizing that acts other than copulation destroy virginity, and clarifying that involuntary sexual pleasure does not destroy virginity. From his Summa Theologica, "Pleasure resulting from resolution of semen may arise in two ways. If this be the result of the mind's purpose, it destroys virginity, whether copulation takes place or not. Augustine, however, mentions copulation, because such like resolution is the ordinary and natural result thereof. On another way this may happen beside the purpose of the mind, either during sleep, or through violence and without the mind's consent, although the flesh derives pleasure from it, or again through weakness of nature, as in the case of those who are subject to a flow of semen. On such cases virginity is not forfeit, because such like pollution is not the result of impurity which excludes virginity."

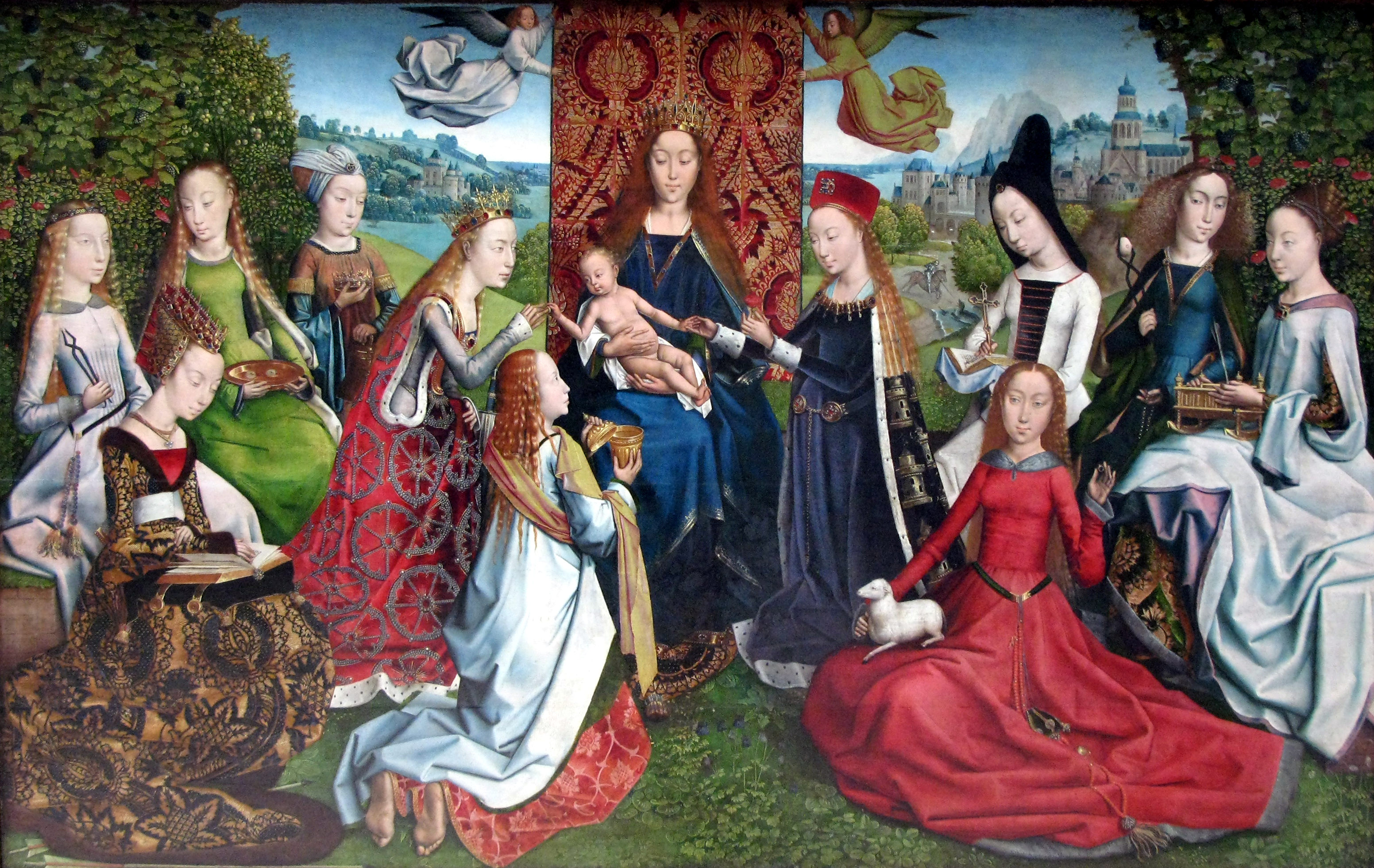
Virgo inter Virgines (The Blessed Virgin Mary with other holy virgins), from Bruges, Belgium during the last quarter of the 15th century.

Some have theorized that the New Testament was not against sex before marriage. The discussion turns on two Greek words — moicheia (μοιχεία, adultery) and porneia (πορνεία, fornication, see also pornography). The first word is restricted to contexts involving sexual betrayal of a spouse; however, the second word is used as a generic term for illegitimate sexual activity. Elsewhere in 1 Corinthians, incest, homosexual intercourse (according to some interpretations) and prostitution are all explicitly forbidden by name (however, the Septuagint uses "porneia" to refer to male temple prostitution). Paul is preaching about activities based on sexual prohibitions in Leviticus, in the context of achieving holiness. The theory suggests it is these, and only these behaviors that are intended by Paul's prohibition in chapter seven. The strongest argument against this theory is that the modern interpretation of the New Testament, outside Corinthians, speaks against premarital sex.

Christian orthodoxy accepts that Mary, the mother of Jesus, was a virgin at the time Jesus was conceived, based on the accounts in the Gospel of Matthew and the Gospel of Luke. Roman Catholics, Eastern Orthodox, and Oriental Orthodox, as well as many Lutherans and Anglicans, hold to the dogma of the perpetual virginity of Mary. However, other Christians reject the dogma, citing sources such as Mark 6:3: "Isn't this the carpenter, the son of Mary, and the brother of James, Joses, Judas, and Simon? And aren't His sisters here with us?". The Catholic Church holds that in Semitic usage the terms "brother", "sister" are applied not only to children of the same parents, but to nephews, nieces, cousins, half-brothers, and half-sisters. Catholics, Orthodox Christians Lutherans, and other groups, such as High Church Anglicans, may refer to Mary as the Virgin Mary or the Blessed Virgin Mary.

The Catholic Encyclopedia says: "There are two elements in virginity: the material element, that is to say, the absence, in the past and in the present, of all complete and voluntary delectation, whether from lust or from the lawful use of marriage; and the formal element, that is the firm resolution to abstain forever from sexual pleasure" and that "Virginity is irreparably lost by sexual pleasure, voluntarily and completely experienced." However, for the purposes of consecrated virgins it is canonically enough that they have never been married or lived in open violation of chastity.

==== Islam ====
Islam considers extramarital sex to be sinful and forbidden. Islamic law prescribes punishments for Muslim men and women for the act of zinā. Though in Western cultures premarital sex and loss of virginity may be considered shameful to the individual, in some Muslim societies an act of premarital sex, even if not falling within the legal standards of proof, may result in personal shame and loss of family honor.

In some modern-day largely Muslim societies such as Turkey, vaginal examinations for verifying a woman's virginity are a clinical practice which are at times state-enforced. These types of examinations are typically ordered for women who go against traditional societal notions of "public morality and rules of modesty", though in 1999 the Turkish penal code was altered to require a woman's consent prior to performing such an examination.

==== Sikhism ====
In Sikhism, sexual activity is supposed to occur only between married individuals. Sikhism advises against premarital sex, as it has a high potential of being an indulgence of lust (kaam, or extreme sexual desire). Sikhism teaches that young women must have decent modesty (sharam) because the honor (izzat) of her family could be jeopardized. Sexual activity and even living together prior to marriage is not allowed in Sikhism. Virginity is an important aspect of spirituality and it has to be preserved before marriage, or when one is ready to move into another sacred state of being with their significant other.

== See also ==
- Almah
- Artificial hymen
- Brahmacharya
- Confraternity of the Cord of Saint Thomas
- Purity ball
- Purity culture
- Purity ring
