= Dam betulim =

Dam betulim (Hebrew: דם בתולים, lit. 'blood [of the] virgin[al]') in Judaism refers to the emission of vaginal blood that is often exuded upon the first time a woman has sexual intercourse and her hymen is penetrated. After the blood exudes, the woman becomes a niddah (Hebrew: נִדָּה), and the couple must refrain from further sexual intercourse until the woman completes her purification process. For this reason, it has sometimes been practice for couples to refrain from sexual intercourse until several days after marriage in order to be able to remain physically intimate for a longer period directly following the wedding.
