= Virginity testing in Indonesia =

Requirement for joining the police and military force in Indonesia

In Indonesia, virginity tests were performed as a requirement for joining the police and military force. Tests have been performed since 1965. It has since been condemned internationally and domestically by news outlets and human rights organisations. In August 2021, the Indonesian Army stated that it would no longer continue this practice for female recruits, and was formally announced by the Indonesian Army Chief of Staff General Andika Perkasa.

== Legal basis ==
The 1999 human rights law in Indonesia bans discrimination against women. The UN Human Rights Office called for ban of virginity testing, viewing the practice to be medically unnecessary, often painful, humiliating, and traumatic. Despite international pressure, Jokowi's government has not initiated legislation to end virginity testing.

== Virginity testing in different fields ==
=== Police ===
Chief Police Regulation No. 5/2009 outlines the Guidelines for Police Candidates. Article 36 requires female applicants to an "obstetrics and gynecology" examination, without specifying further. Tests are conducted by the Police Medical and Health Center (Pusat Kedokteran dan Kesehatan) using the "two-finger test". The Indonesian National Police jobs website stated in 2014, that, "In addition to the medical and physical tests, women who want to be policewomen must also undergo virginity tests. So all women who want to become policewomen should keep their virginity." The official letter containing the order to stop the tests has been sent in 2014 and its gradually being implemented, however it may still be performed on regional areas.

=== Military ===
The Indonesian National Armed Forces also has been conducting this practice, as confirmed by its deputy head of the Health Center, Andriani. The test isn't only required for female applicants, but also for the fiancées of its personnel. They carry out the test to "ensure the health of the body and the spirit of these women." High-ranking officials have deemed the test to be relevant, as it measures "the personality and mentality of the person," and linked non-virgin women to bad habits as opposed to military personnel who are supposed to "protect the nation."

==== Discontinuation ====
In August 2021, Indonesian Army Chief of Staff General Andika Perkasa has officially announced that the Army will no longer conduct virginity testing for female recruits. The Navy and Air Force have already stopped these tests as well previously.

=== Schools ===
Several attempts have been made to make virginity testing compulsory in school applications across Indonesia. In 2010, the Regional Representative Council of Jambi made a recommendation to conduct virginity tests to students upon enrolling in junior high school and high school. The same recommendation was made by the Regional Representative Council of Jember in 2015. In 2013, the Education Department of Prabumulih, South Sumatra recommended conducting virginity tests to high school students, and even incorporating it to the regional budget plan.

=== Sports ===
In December 2019, a gymnast from East Java was banned from competing at the 2019 SEA Games in the Philippines due to virginity rumors. The controversy sparked protests from Indonesian activists and various women's rights organizations.

== Media coverage ==
The Jakarta Post first reported on 21 August 2013 about the planned virginity tests in Sumatra. The story was picked up by western outlets such as The Guardian and Huffington Post The plans were cancelled after protests.

The Human Rights Watch first reported on November 17, 2014, about "painful and traumatic" virginity as a requirements for Indonesia's National Police and released a video of the women interviewed. This sparked an international outcry with extensive coverage. One day later Tedjo Edhy Purdijatno, (minister for politics, law, and security) confirmed that virginity test have long been mandatory for applicants of the military, namely the Indonesian National Armed Forces (TNI). Three days later, the head of the National Police, Moechgiyarto defended the test stating the women have to live up to high moral standards and would not accept candidates if they turn out to be "prostitutes".

== Response ==
Doctors in Indonesia have stated that virginity testing doesn't have scientific basis. So when they are demanded to do virginity testing, they only describe the condition of the hymen. They are not legally and medically allowed to judge what has happened to the hymen.

In May 2015, the European Commission declared virginity testing a "discriminatory and degrading practice," supporting Indonesian health minister Nila Moeloek, who has publicly opposed the tests, having "doubts on the necessity, accuracy and merits of such tests as a requirement to recruit young policewomen".

In 2017, an Indonesian judge, Binsar Gultom, published a book that suggested virginity testing to soon-to-be-married couples, insisting that it could lower the nation's divorce rate. The book recommended "preventive and repressive measures from the government" to non-virgin fiancées.
