= Hymenotomy =

Surgical removal or opening of the hymen

- ICD-9-CM: 70.11

A hymenotomy, also known as a hymenectomy, is a medical procedure involving the surgical removal or opening of the hymen. It is often performed on patients with an imperforate or septate hymen, or other situations where the hymen is unusually thick or rigid such as microperforate hymen. In the case of a female with a hymen without any opening, an opening may be created to facilitate menstruation. In situations where the opening is extremely small or the band(s) of a septate hymen limit access to the vaginal opening, the woman may elect for hymenotomy to allow for comfortable sexual penetration of her vagina, or to relieve pain or discomfort that occurs when inserting/removing tampons. Sexual intercourse would not normally be adversely affected by a hymenotomy.

== See also ==
- Hymenorrhaphy
- List of surgeries by type
