= Artificial hymen =

Type of prosthetic

An artificial hymen is a type of prosthetic created for the purpose of simulating an idealized human hymen, usually to fake virginity, which some wrongly believe can be identified by the appearance, tightness, or bleeding of the hymen during vaginal penetration.

== Use ==
Artificial hymens are made of a material which, when properly inserted, adhere to the inside of the vagina, temporarily giving the appearance of an idealized "intact" hymen and releasing a red liquid that looks like blood when subjected to pressure.

Artificial hymens do not mimic real hymens, but a false idealized popular image of hymens. While there is a popular misconception that hymens are either "intact" or "broken", there is no such distinction, and there is no medical or scientific way to prove or disprove virginity by the state of the hymen. Real hymens do not in fact "break", and more often than not do not tear or alter during vaginal intercourse, being quite elastic after puberty. Hymens have few blood vessels and may not bleed significantly even if torn. Vaginal walls are more likely to bleed, due to lack of lubrication or forced penetration.

== Controversy ==
There are various opinions on artificial hymen treatments and related "hymen reconstruction" surgeries. These arguments may range from the perspectives and experiences of medical professionals performing the procedures to the women who are directly involved in seeking them out. These outlooks are founded on discussing what the role of the prosthetic is on society's adherence to the concept of virginity, specifically the virginity of women. In addition to medical professionals arguing against these procedures, there have also been feminist writers and other individuals who have argued against the use of artificial hymen for differing reasons. Alternatively, there are other accounts from feminist writers and different women who argue for the existence of these procedures for various reasons.

The majority of the retaliation for artificial hymen stems from different individuals finding it either oppressive to women or deceitful towards others. Many scholars find the artificial hymen and related procedures to be degrading of women. They specifically argue that these procedures act in parallel with other forms of patriarchal control over women's bodies. The medical community has also established how it is typical for many women to not bleed during their first intercourse, and that hymen "restoration" procedures further glorify myths surrounding hymens alongside patriarchal ideals surrounding female virginity. In continuation, other scholars argue that by obtaining these procedures women are giving up bodily autonomy and complying with societal expectations of the concept of virginity. Alternatively, more conservative-leaning individuals argue that these procedures should be banned because they are morally wrong and deceitful towards others. More specifically, Egyptian lawmakers have argued for the banning of artificial hymen products because they believed they encouraged women to participate in pre-marital sex by allowing them to fake their virginity, which goes against the standards set in place through their religious beliefs.

The existence of the artificial hymen has also been supported by medical professionals, feminist scholars, and women seeking out the procedures. In overview, these individuals generally argue that these procedures further degrade the patriarchy while providing women with bodily autonomy and a means to cope with trauma. Feminist scholars and professors who have written on this subject have held a controversial opinion in stating that hymen "reconstruction" procedures exist as a manner for which women could further weaken the control that the patriarchy holds over them. They see the choice to obtain an artificial hymen and related procedures as empowering by allowing women to obtain control over their sexuality. Research on hymen "reconstruction" focused on interviewing the women obtaining these procedures has further revealed their personal experiences. Some of these studies have highlighted how women that have suffered sexual trauma find these procedures as a form of coping.

== See also ==
- Hymenorrhaphy, misleadingly called hymen reconstruction surgery
- Vaginoplasty, other surgery on the vulva or vagina
