= Hymenorrhaphy =

Cosmetic surgery on the hymen, based on misconceptions of the hymen

- Other names: Hymen reconstruction surgery, hymen repair (both misnomers)
- ICD-9-CM: 70.76

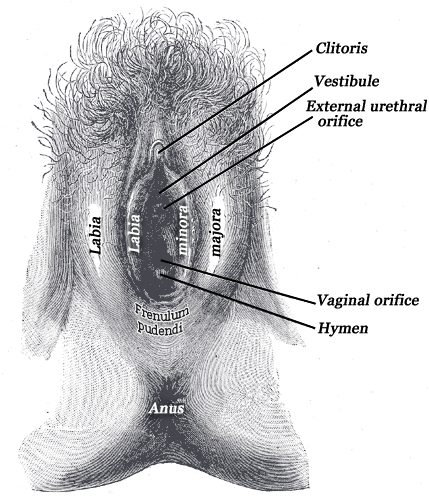
External genital organs of female

Hymenorrhaphy or "hymen reconstruction surgery" is the surgical alteration of the hymen, with the goal of producing bleeding on intercourse and a tight vaginal introitus, falsely believed to indicate virginity. The term comes from the Greek words hymen meaning "membrane", and raphḗ meaning "suture". It is also known as hymenoplasty, although strictly this term would also include hymenotomy.

The normal aim is to cause bleeding during post-nuptial intercourse, which in some cultures is wrongly considered proof of virginity. Roughly half of women having vaginal intercourse for the first time do not bleed; a small study found that of 19 women who underwent hymenorrhaphy and attended follow-up, 17 did not have bleeding at the next intercourse.

It is also based on the false belief that there are "intact" and "broken" hymens, distinct in appearance or feel. It is not possible to determine whether someone is a virgin by the appearance of their hymen or the tightness of the vagina.

Hymenorrhaphies are not generally regarded as part of mainstream gynecology, but are available from some plastic surgery centers. The operation is popular in Middle Eastern countries, in particular in Iran. Hymenorraphy is considered a form of cosmetic surgery, and is not generally accepted, taught, or regulated by the medical profession.

== Motive ==
Hymenorraphy is based on the false belief that all women bleed when first having vaginal intercourse; in fact, only about half bleed; as few as a third in one informal survey. Hymens have few blood vessels and may not bleed significantly even when torn, and vaginal walls may bleed significantly when torn. Blood on the sheets on first intercourse is more likely to be due to lacerations to the vaginal wall caused by inadequate vaginal lubrication or forced penetration.

Despite common cultural beliefs, there are not distinct "intact" and "broken" states for the hymen, and the state of a hymen cannot be used to prove or disprove virginity. Medical professionals therefore recommend against describing hymens as "intact" or "broken".

Hymens vary greatly in appearance. Imperforate hymens, completely covering the vagina, can cause medical problems and are fortunately rare. Septate, cribriform, and microperforate hymens may also cause medical difficulties. Labiate, carunculate, redundant, fimbriate, crescentic, and annular hymens are naturally occurring variations. The most common form of hymen is a crescent-shaped band along the back edge of the vaginal opening. Bumps, mounds, clefts, and notches in the edge of the hymen are normal, even in newborns.

Inserting objects (including penises) into the vagina may or may not affect the hymen. Penile penetration does not lead to predictable changes to female genital organs; after puberty, hymens are highly elastic and can stretch during penetration without trace of injury. Females with a confirmed history of sexual abuse involving genital penetration may have normal hymens. Young females who say they have had consensual sex mostly show no identifiable changes in the hymen. Hymens naturally have irregularities in width, and hymens can heal spontaneously without scarring. Visible breaks in the hymen, including complete hymenal clefts, are also common in girls and women who have never been sexually active.

It is not possible to tell by feel or tightness whether someone has previously had vaginal intercourse. Tightness of the vagina during first intercourse is mostly caused by an involuntary clenching the muscles of the pelvic floor due to nervousness. Such involuntary clenching can be strong enough to make intercourse difficult, painful, or impossible; when this occurs in a woman who has previously been able to have vaginal intercourse, it is called secondary vaginismus.

== Operation ==
In a purely cosmetic procedure, a membrane without blood supply is created, sometimes including a gelatine capsule of an artificial bloodlike substance. This operation is intended to be performed within a few days before an intended marriage. Operations have grown more sophisticated over time.

Because there is no standard "intact" appearance of a hymen, the surgeon must creatively shape a hymen that conforms to social expectations.

== Availability and legality ==
Some hymen reconstruction operations are legal in some countries, while other countries ban all hymenorrhaphy. For example, in 2020 in the Netherlands the professional surgeon associations adjusted their codes to prohibit hymenorrhaphy, and the government stated it would consider a legal ban if practice continues. The number of women undergoing the operation in the country at the time was estimated as several hundred per year. The United Kingdom criminalised the procedure (referred to as "hymenoplasty") even with consent, along with aiding and abetting it or offering to carry it out, with the Health and Care Act 2022. The same Act also banned virginity testing. The World Health Organization considers hymenorrhaphy a form of female genital mutilation.

The operation is popular in Middle Eastern countries, in particular in Iran, where women are expected to keep virginity until their wedding night. Grand Ayatollah Sayyid Sadeq Rohani has issued a fatwa which says that a woman who has undergone hymenorrhaphy is a virgin, and a man marrying her cannot divorce her on the grounds that she is not a virgin.

== See also ==
- Artificial hymen – Type of prosthetic
- Born-again virgin – Person who commits to abstinence after having had sexual intercourse
- Genital modification and mutilation – Permanent or temporary changes to human sex organs
- Kyōko Aizome – Japanese erotic actress (born 1958)
- Vaginoplasty – Surgical procedure
