= Virginity test =

Examination intended to determine female virginity

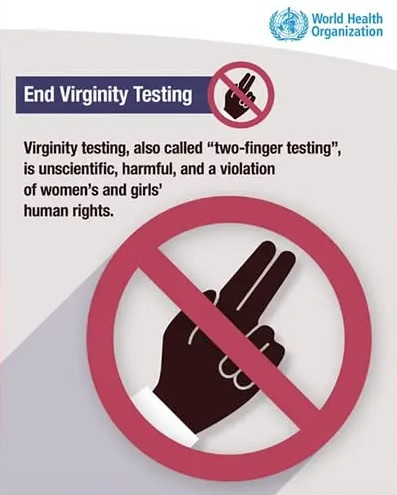
World Health Organization poster against virginity testing

A virginity test is the pseudoscientific practice and process of determining whether a woman or girl is a virgin; i.e., to determine that she has never engaged in, or been subjected to, vaginal intercourse. The test typically involves a check for the presence of an intact hymen, typically on the flawed assumption that it can only be, and will always be torn as a result of vaginal intercourse. Virginity testing is most common in Asia, the Middle East, Northern Africa and Southern Africa.

Virginity testing is widely considered controversial because of its implications for the tested women and girls as it is viewed as unethical, and because such tests are widely considered to be unscientific. In cases of suspected rape, child sexual abuse, or other forms of sexual assault, a detailed examination of the hymen may be performed, but the condition of the hymen alone is often inconclusive. In October 2018, the UN Human Rights Council, UN Women and the World Health Organization (WHO) called for the ban of virginity testing as it is a painful, humiliating and a traumatic practice that constitutes violence against women.

== History ==
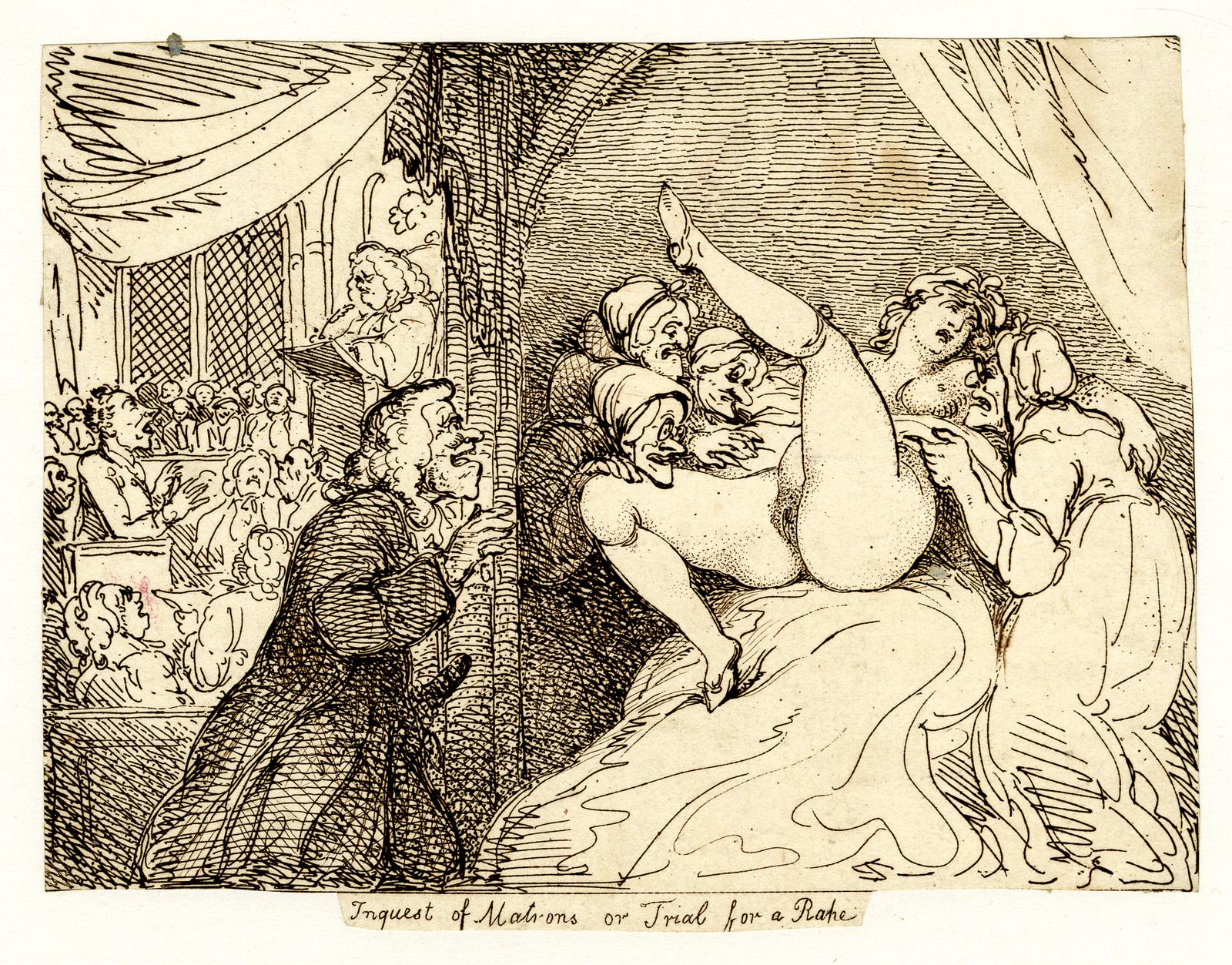
Thomas Rowlandson, Inquest of Matrons or Trial for a Rape, c. 1790–1810

Many pre-modern societies placed great value on assessing the virginity of their girls, as is attested in sources ranging from mythology to popular literature, folklore, and official records.

Prior to the advance of anatomical knowledge in the 15th century, the nature of the hymen was not fully understood, and consequently a great variety of more or less fantastical or scientific tests were advocated for. The Incas of Peru reserved their sacred "Virgins of the Sun" as brides for high status men, and when a girl was suspected of sexual activity, she was made to blow into a smouldering fire; if the fire flared up, she was deemed chaste. In ancient Greece, a story related in the 5th century BC tells how the god Pan could establish the purity of any girl, as his mystical flute responded spontaneously to the presence of a virgin.

The Medieval romances Floris and Blancheflur (c. 1250) and Bevis of Hampton (c. 1300) both feature virgin heroines who must prove their purity and therefore their worth. (Note: The captive Christian princess Blancheflur is compelled by her master the Emir to immerse her hands in a water that will stain impure flesh. Josiane offers to prove her virginity (not specifying how) to her sceptical lover, Sir Bevis.) The scenario was also acted out on the English stage, in plays such as Middleton's The Changeling (1622).

== Method ==
The process of virginity testing varies by region. In areas where medical doctors are available, the tests would often be given in a doctor's office. However, in countries where doctors are not available, testers will often be older women, or whoever can be trusted to search for a hymen. This is common among African tribes that perform the test.

Another form of virginity testing involves testing for laxity of vaginal muscles with fingers (the "two-finger test"). A doctor performs the test by inserting a finger into the female's vagina to check the level of vaginal laxity, which is used to determine if she is "habituated to sexual intercourse". However, the usefulness of these criteria has been questioned by medical authorities and opponents of virginity testing because vaginal laxity and the absence of a hymen can both be caused by other factors, and the "two-finger test" is based on subjective observation.

Among the Bantu peoples of Sub-Saharan Africa, virginity testing or even the suturing of the labia majora (called infibulation) has been commonplace. Traditionally, Kenuzi girls (of the Sudan) are married before puberty by adult men who inspect them manually for virginity.

== Reliability ==
Many researchers state that a torn hymen is not a reliable indicator that a female has been vaginally penetrated because the tearing of the hymen may have been the result of some other event. Furthermore, some women are born without hymens. It is a misconception that the hymen always tears during first intercourse or that intercourse is required to rupture the hymen.

A female can undergo a surgical procedure, called hymenorrhaphy or hymenoplasty, to repair or replace a torn hymen, to "pass" a virginity test.

== Prevalence and legality ==
Virginity testing is most common in Asia and the Middle East, as well as Northern and Southern Africa. Their recent use in the United Kingdom dates back to the 1970s. It is legal for doctors in the United States to perform virginity tests. Examinations to test for previous sexual activity used to be performed on rape victims in Bangladesh, Pakistan and India before it was banned.

Complications at times arise in the characterisation of hymen tests as necessarily abusive. This is because hymen examinations, are sometimes requested by women and family members to prove the sexual status of women (to determine if they are virgins or not, such as in matters of marriage) and by the state to use as evidence in case of abuse in criminal trials.

In 2003, the Supreme Court of India called TFT "hypothetical" and "opinionative". In May 2013, the court held that the two-finger test on a rape victim violates her right to privacy, and asked the Delhi government to provide better medical procedures to confirm sexual assault. In October 2022 the court strongly criticized the utilization of the "two-finger test" in rape and sexual assault cases and urged the central government to take immediate steps to cease the practice. The court emphasized that this test lacks any scientific foundation to determine the sexual history of women and instead causes further trauma to survivors. As a result, the court ruled that anyone conducting such a test on a survivor would be considered guilty of misconduct. Most countries have scrapped it as archaic, unscientific and invasive of privacy and dignity. Quebec's Collège des Médecins has banned members from conducting virginity tests after some were found to be doing this, as well as providing virginity certificates. In 2021 the Lahore High Court banned the use of virginity tests in cases where women claim they were raped. The UK's Royal College of Midwives says that virginity testing is indefensible with no medical benefit. It was criminalised in the UK from 2022, along with hymenorrhaphy and offering or aiding and abetting these procedures, with the Health and Care Act 2022.

== Reasons ==
=== Cultural ===
Many cultures require proof of a bride's virginity prior to her marriage. This has traditionally been tested by the presence of an intact hymen, which was verified by either a physical examination (usually by a physician), who would provide a certificate of virginity or by a "proof of blood", which refers to vaginal bleeding that results from the tearing of the hymen. The physical examination would normally be undertaken before the marriage ceremony, while the "proof by blood" involves an inspection for signs of bleeding as part of the consummation of marriage, after the ceremony.

=== Immigration ===
Virginity testing was performed on Indian women as part of the British immigration system in the 1970s, when there was a suspicion that an applicant might be already married. Applicants were expected to be virgins if they were not married.

=== Prevention of disease and pregnancy ===
Preventing the spread of HIV and teenage pregnancy are examples of reasons given by proponents of virginity testing. In 2004, a Zimbabwean village chief, Naboth Makoni, stated that he would adopt a plan to enforce virginity tests as a way of protecting his people against HIV. He explained that he focuses on girls because he believes they are easier to control than boys. In South Africa, where virginity testing is banned for girls under the age of 16, the Zulu tribe believes that the practice prevents the spread of HIV and teenage pregnancy. A woman interviewed by the Washington Post stated that "[Virginity testing] is important so that young girls become scared of boys. Because what happens is first the boy strips you of your virginity, and the next thing you know is you are pregnant and you have HIV."

=== Royal affirmations ===
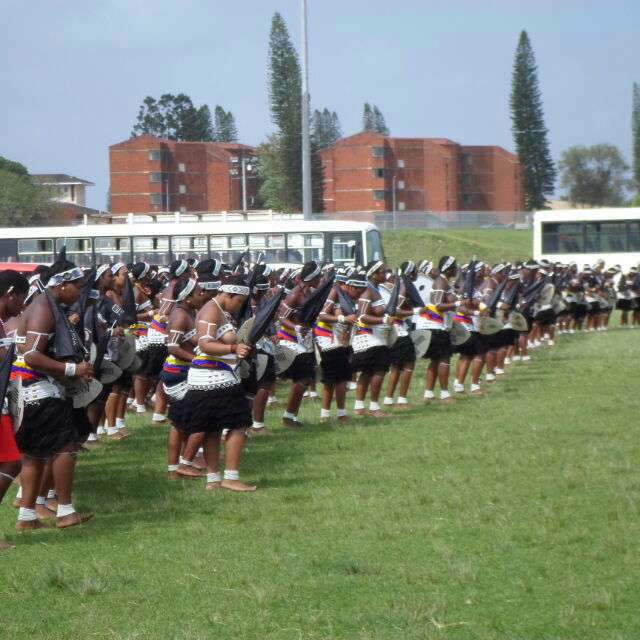
Zulu virgins in 2019

In Zulu culture, there is a tradition in which girls of a certain age can perform a dance for the king. However, only virgins are allowed to participate. If a girl is tested and declared a virgin, she brings honor to her family. If a girl is found not to be a virgin, her father may have to pay a fine for "tainting" the community and the girl may be shunned from the "certified" virgins. Because of the ramifications that being considered impure have for the girls and their families, virginity testing has the potential to be a life-changing event.

== Impact & Examples ==
Virginity testing drives unequal social pressures for men and women to remain virgins until they marry. Virginity testing perpetuates these harmful stereotyped beliefs through the discriminatory framework that women are primarily responsible for all sexual activity and misconduct.

=== Iran ===
In Iran, testing is performed for both formal and informal reasons, and examiners view such testing with ambiguity about the accuracy and certainty of the diagnosis and uncertainty about ethics and reproductive rights. Examiners are affected by the overt and covert consequences of virginity testing, beliefs and cultural values underlying virginity testing, and informal and formal reasons for virginity testing also used to examine sexual offence. The German news network Deutsche Welle reported in 2024 that Iranian prisons were using hymen checks.

In June 2015, Atena Farghadani was charged with "illicit sexual relations falling short of adultery" for shaking hands with her lawyer in June of that year. She complained that Iranian prison officials and guards have made lewd gestures, sexual slurs and other insults to her, and went on a three-day "dry" hunger strike in September 2015 in protest of this ill-treatment. However, the harassment continued. In a note written by Farghadani leaked from prison, which has been seen by Amnesty International, Farghadani says the judicial authorities took her to a medical center outside the prison on 12 August 2015 and forced her to submit to a virginity test, purportedly for the purpose of investigating the charge against her.

=== Egypt ===
Egypt's military forces performed virginity tests on women detained during the 2011 Egyptian revolution. After Amnesty International protested to the Egyptian government in March 2011, the government claimed the tests were carried out in order to refute claims that the women had been raped while in detention. Amnesty International described the virginity tests as "nothing less than torture". Virginity tests done by the military on detainees were banned in Egypt on 27 December 2011, but in March 2012, the physician who carried out the tests was acquitted of all charges. Samira Ibrahim, the Egyptian woman who filed the lawsuit against the government that initiated public discussion of their use of virginity testing, said in response to the physician's acquittal: "A woman's body should not be used as a tool for intimidation, and nobody should have their dignity violated."

=== United Kingdom ===
Prior to the 1980s, virginity testing was also used on women entering the United Kingdom on what was popularly called a fiancée visa, when they said they were immigrating to marry their fiancées who were already living in the country. The British government argued that if the women were virgins, they were more likely to be telling the truth about their reason for immigrating to the country. In January 1979, a woman was required by British immigration officers to undergo a virginity test when she arrived in London claiming that she was there to marry. Such a visit did not require a visa, but as proof of her bona fides, she was required to submit to the test. This practice was exposed by The Guardian in 1979 and the policy was quickly changed.

=== Indonesia ===
Virginity testing in Indonesia for female applicants to the military and police has been practiced since 1965 and is carried out during medical examinations. An announcement was made in August 2013 in Prabumulih district, South Sumatra, Indonesia, by local education chief Muhammad Rasyid, that teenage girls attending high school there would be given mandatory annual virginity tests, beginning in 2014. The stated intent was to reduce promiscuity in the district. In 2014 the Human Rights Watch reported that a physical virginity test is routinely performed on female candidates to the Indonesian National Police as part of the job application process.
In August 2021, the Indonesian Army Chief of Staff General Andika Perkasa officially announced that the army will no longer conduct virginity testing for female recruits. The navy and air force had already stopped conducting virginity tests.

=== India ===
In India's Kanjarbhat community, after a marriage ceremony takes place, a virginity test is carried out on the newly-married wife using a white bed sheet. If the woman bleeds following intercourse with her new husband, it is declared that 'Maal khara hai' (the goods are pure) and if she does not bleed, the council will declare that 'Maal khota hai' (the goods are spoiled). In 2019, the Maharashtra state government announced that it intended to make virginity tests for brides a punishable offence, describing the practice as a form of sexual assault.

=== Afghanistan ===
Virginity tests are common in Afghanistan. Some women undergo multiple tests. The tests are often done without the woman's consent. They have drawn widespread condemnation, with critics saying they are inhumane and hurt the dignity of women.

== See also ==
- Artificial hymen
- Madonna–whore complex
- Virgin complex
- Virginity
- Body cavity search
- GCC homosexuality test
- Health and Care Act 2022
