= Tight hymenal ring =

Human disease

- Specialty: Gynecology

Tight hymenal ring is a disorder of the hymen, characterized by a rigid hymen and tight introitus, whether acquired or congenital (present from birth). It excludes an imperforate hymen.

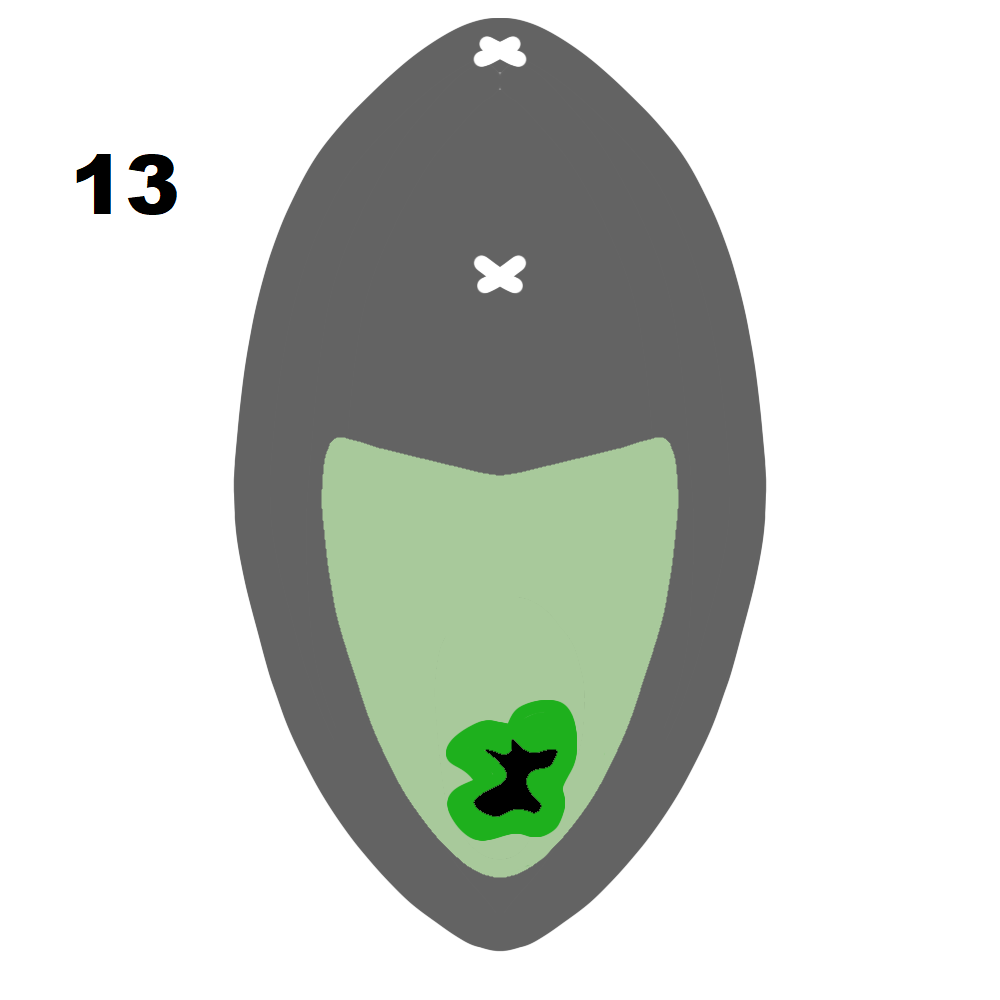
A diagram showing one possible way a tight hymenal ring, also called a sleeve hymen, can present, marked in green.

The individual with tight hymenal ring might face difficulty in inserting a tampon into the vagina or having intercourse. The condition can be relieved by outpatient surgery or manual dilation.
