= Hymen =

Membrane that surrounds or partially covers the vaginal opening

- External genitals of a human female

- Various hymen defects (the shaded areas represent the vaginal opening)

Details

Identifiers
- Latin: hymen
- Greek: ὑμήν
- MeSH: D006924
- TA98: A09.1.04.008
- TA2: 3530
- FMA: 20005

The hymen is a thin piece of mucosal tissue that surrounds or partially covers the vaginal opening. A small percentage of females are born with hymens that are imperforate and completely obstruct the vaginal canal. It forms part of the vulva and is similar in structure to the vagina. The word is from the Greek ὑμήν meaning a thin skin or membrane. Many mammals possess hymens due to similar reproductive development.

In children, a common appearance of the hymen is crescent-shaped, although many shapes are possible. Each shape in the natural range has a Latinate name. During puberty, estrogen causes the hymen to change in appearance and become very elastic. Normal variations of the post-pubertal hymen range from thin and stretchy to thick and somewhat rigid. Very rarely, it may be completely absent.

The hymen can rip or tear during penetrative intercourse, which usually results in pain and, sometimes, mild temporary bleeding or spotting. Minor injuries to the hymen may heal on their own, and not require surgical intervention. Historically, it was assumed that first penetration was necessarily traumatic, but now sources differ on how common tearing or bleeding are as a result of first intercourse. Therefore, the state of the hymen is not a reliable indicator of virginity, though "virginity testing" remains a common practice in some cultures, sometimes accompanied by hymen reconstruction surgery to give the appearance of virginity. International health organizations condemn virginity testing as harmful. Historically, it was also misinterpreted in medicine as evidence of female hysteria.

== Development and histology ==
The genital tract develops during embryogenesis, from the third week of gestation to the second trimester, and the hymen is formed following the vagina. At week seven, the urorectal septum forms and separates the rectum from the urogenital sinus. At week nine, the Müllerian ducts move downwards to reach the urogenital sinus, forming the uterovaginal canal and inserting into the urogenital sinus. At week twelve, the Müllerian ducts fuse to create a primitive uterovaginal canal called unaleria. At month five, the vaginal canalization is complete and the fetal hymen is formed from the proliferation of the sinovaginal bulbs (where Müllerian ducts meet the urogenital sinus), and normally becomes perforate before or shortly after birth.

The hymen has dense innervation. In newborn babies, still under the influence of the mother's hormones, the hymen is thick, pale pink, and redundant (folds in on itself and may protrude). For the first two to four years of life, the infant produces hormones that continue this effect. Their hymenal opening tends to be annular (circumferential).

Post neonatal stage, the diameter of the hymenal opening (measured within the hymenal ring) widens by approximately 1 mm for each year of age. During puberty, estrogen causes the hymen to become very elastic and fimbriated.

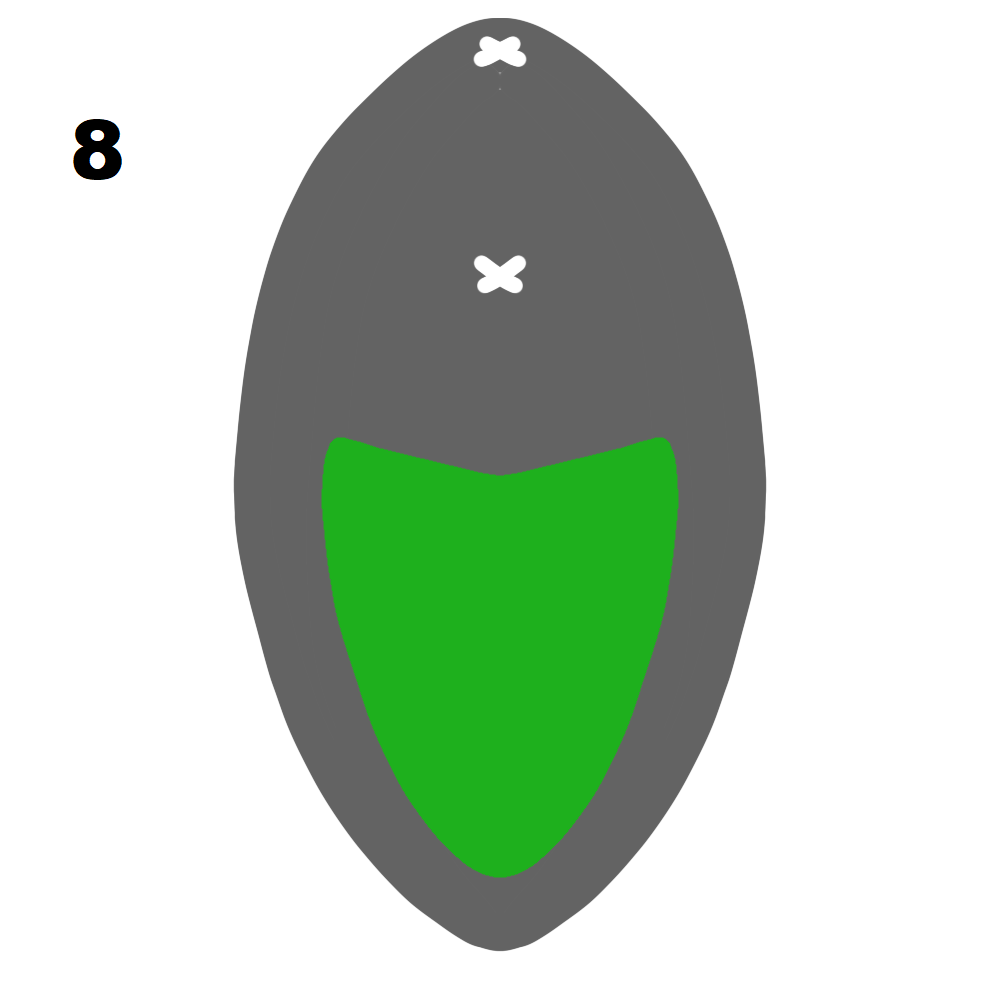
A diagram of an imperforate hymen, without any holes and entirely covering the vaginal opening.

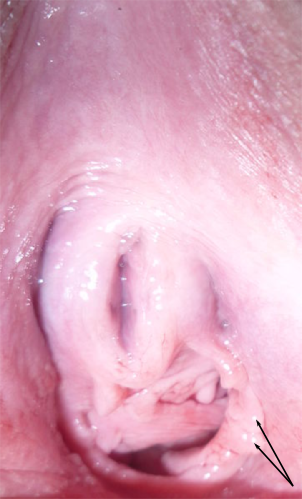
Arrows point to carunculae myrtiformes of the hymen in a post-pubertal individual.

The hymen can stretch or tear as a result of sexual intercourse. Remnants of the hymen are called carunculae myrtiformes.

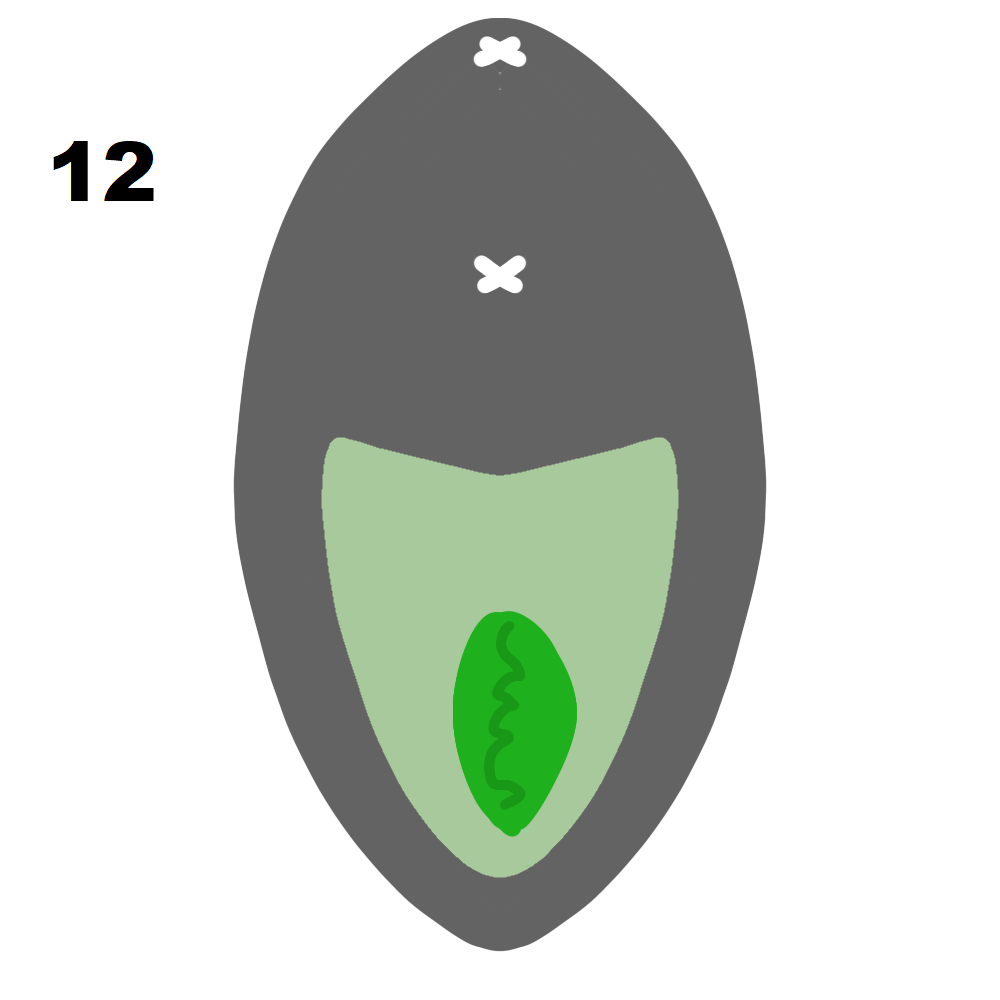
A diagram of a hymen that is extra thick and fleshy, completely hiding the vaginal opening within its multiple folds. This is sometimes informally called a sleeve hymen, and is not to be confused with an imperforate hymen.

A glass or plastic rod of 6 mm diameter having a globe on one end with varying diameter from 10 to 25 mm, called a Glaister Keen rod, is used for close examination of the hymen or the degree of its rupture. In forensic medicine, it is recommended by health authorities that a physician who must swab near this area of a prepubescent girl avoid the hymen and swab the outer vulval vestibule instead. In cases of suspected rape or child sexual abuse, a detailed examination of the hymen may be performed, but the condition of the hymen alone is often inconclusive.

== Anatomic variations ==
Normal variations of the hymen range from thin and stretchy to thick and somewhat rigid. An imperforate hymen occurs in 1-2 out of 1,000 infants. The only variation that may require medical intervention is the imperforate hymen, which either completely prevents the normal passage of menstrual fluid or slows it significantly. In either case, surgical intervention may be needed to allow menstrual fluid to pass or intercourse to take place at all.

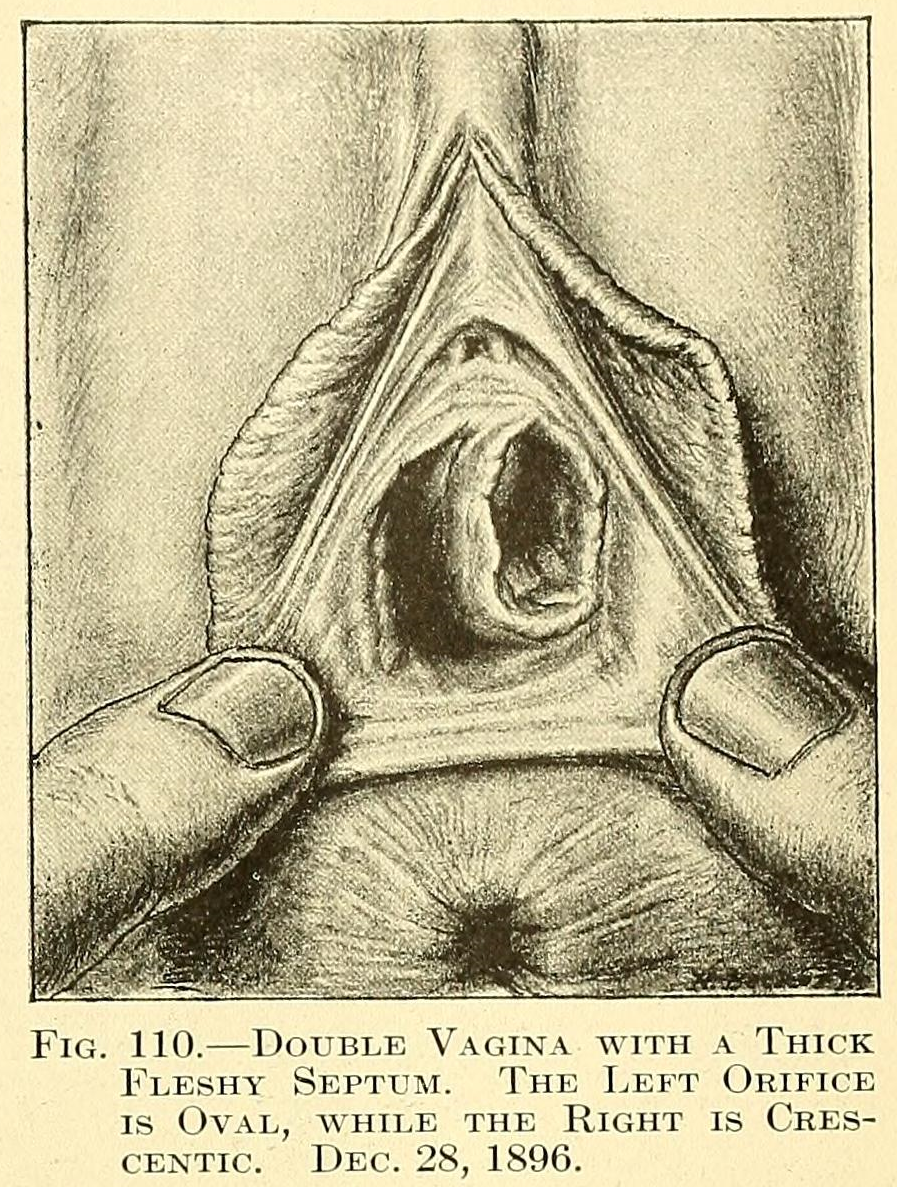
A medical illustration showing a hymen that greatly protrudes from the vaginal canal, creating a double vagina.

Prepubescent hymenal openings come in many shapes, depending on hormonal and activity level, the most common being crescentic (posterior rim): no tissue at the 12 o'clock position; crescent-shaped band of tissue from 1–2 to 10–11 o'clock, at its widest around 6 o'clock. From puberty onwards, depending on estrogen and activity levels, the hymenal tissue may be thicker, and the opening is often fimbriated or erratically shaped. In younger children, a torn hymen will typically heal very quickly. In adolescents, the hymenal opening can naturally extend and variation in shape and appearance increases.

Variations of the female reproductive tract can result from agenesis or hypoplasia, canalization defects, lateral fusion and failure of resorption, resulting in various complications.

- Imperforate: hymenal opening nonexistent; will require minor surgery if it has not corrected itself by puberty to allow menstrual fluids to escape.
- Cribriform, or microperforate: sometimes confused for imperforate, the hymenal opening appears to be nonexistent, but has, under close examination, small perforations.
- Septate: the hymenal opening has one or more bands of tissue extending across the opening.
- Tight hymenal ring: the hymen is rigid and the introitus tight.

== Function ==
Due to similar reproductive system development, many mammals have hymens, including chimpanzees, elephants, manatees, whales, horses and llamas to protect internal from bacteria, viruses and pathogens, especially before the development of bowel movements control, also, the full development of the immune system during the growth period.

== Cultural and religious significance ==
The hymen is often attributed important cultural significance in certain communities because of its association with a woman's virginity. In those cultures, an intact hymen is highly valued at marriage in the belief that this is a proof of virginity. Some women undergo hymenorrhaphy to restore their hymen for this reason. In October 2018, the UN Human Rights Council, UN Women and the World Health Organization (WHO) stated that virginity testing must end as "it is a painful, humiliating and traumatic practice, constituting violence against women".

Some traditional Christian theological interpretations state that it is intended by God for the husband to be the one to break his wife's hymen, and that the bleeding the hymen, believed occur during first intercourse (but see above), is a blood covenant that seals the bond of holy matrimony between husband and wife (cf. consummation).

=== Trauma ===
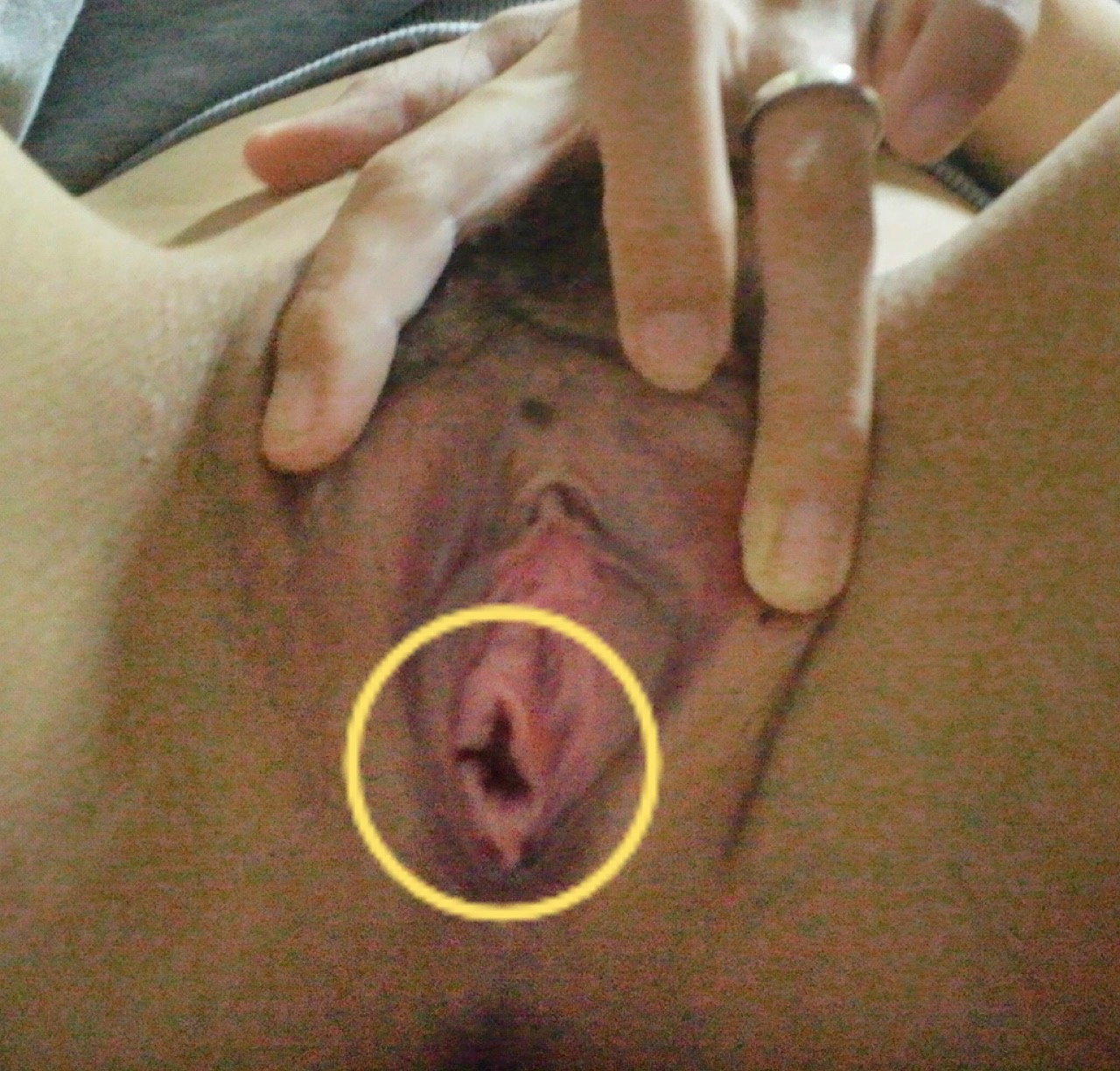
A hymen with a hymenal cleft visible on the left.

Historically, it was believed that first sexual intercourse was necessarily traumatic to the hymen and always resulted in the hymen being "broken" or torn, causing bleeding. However, research on women in Western populations has found that bleeding during first intercourse does not invariably occur. In one cross-cultural study, slightly more than half of all women self-reported bleeding during first intercourse, with significantly different levels of pain and bleeding reported depending on their region of origin. Not all women experience pain, and one study found a correlation between the experience of strong emotions – such as excitement, nervousness, or fear – with experiencing pain during first intercourse.

In several studies of adolescent female rape survivors, where patients were examined at a hospital following sexual assault, half or fewer of survivors who had not had penetration previously had any injury to the hymen. Tears of the hymen occurred in less than a quarter of cases. However, subjects that previously had not had penetrative intercourse were significantly more likely to have sustained injuries to the hymen than subjects who were found to have had penetrative intercourse.

In a study of adolescents who had previously had consensual sex, approximately half showed evidence of trauma to the hymen. Trauma to the hymen may also occur in adult non-virgins following consensual sex, although it is rare. Trauma to the hymen may heal without any visible sign of injury. An observational study of adolescent sexual assault victims found that majority of wounds to the hymen healed without any visible sign of injury having occurred.

Trauma to the hymen is hypothesized to occur as a result of various other behaviors, such as tampon or menstrual cup use, pelvic examinations with a speculum, masturbation, gymnastics, or horseback riding, although the true prevalence of trauma as a result of these activities is unclear.

=== Womb-fury ===
In the 16th and 17th centuries, medical researchers mistakenly saw the presence or absence of the hymen as founding evidence of physical diseases such as "womb-fury", i.e., (female) hysteria. If not cured, womb-fury would, according to doctors practicing at the time, result in death.

== Other animals ==
Due to similar reproductive system development, many mammals have hymens, including chimpanzees, elephants, manatees, whales, horses and llamas.

== See also ==
- Artificial hymen
