= List of causes of genital pain =

Genital pain and pelvic pain can arise from a variety of conditions, crimes, trauma, medical treatments, physical diseases, mental illness and infections. In some instances the pain is consensual and self-induced. Self-induced pain can be a cause for concern and may require a psychiatric evaluation. In other instances the infliction of pain is consensual but caused by another person (such as in surgery or tattooing). In other instances, the pain is vague and difficult to localize. Abdominal pain can be related to conditions related to reproductive and urinary tissues and organs.

Those with pain in the genital and pelvic regions can have dysfunctional voiding or defecation. Pain in this region of the body can be associated with anxiety, depression and other psycho-social factors. In addition, this pain can have effects on activities of daily living or quality of life. Treatment can be symptomatic if the pathology is unknown and managed by physical therapy, counseling and medication.

== Common to women and men ==
- anal fissure
- bladder mucosal inflammation
- bladder pain syndrome
- body modification
- constipation
- cystitis
- dyspareunia
- defecation
- epidermal cyst
- epiploic appendagitis
- genital modification and mutilation
- genital piercing
- genital warts
- hematoma
- hematometra
- hematosalpinx
- hematuria
- herpes genitalis
- increased anal resting pressures
- infibulation
- interstitial cystitis/bladder pain syndrome
- kidney stone
- levator ani syndrome
- Molluscum contagiosum
- pelvic congestion syndrome
- pelvic floor muscle spasm
- persistent genital arousal disorder
- polyuria
- proctalgia fugax
- pubic piercing
- rape
- rectal prolapse
- sexual assault
- sebaceous cyst
- sex toys
- sexual intercourse
- rough foreplay
- strangury
- urinary frequency
- urinary incontinence
- urinary retention
- shaving pubic hair
- wound dehiscence
- Chafing (skin)

== Females ==
- adhesions
- adenomyosis
- Bartholin's cyst
- biopsy
- cervical motion tenderness
- Primary dysmenorrhoea
- contact dermatitis
- ectopic pregnancy
- endometrial biopsy
- endometrial polyp
- endometriosis
- endometriosis of ovary
- folliculitis
- female genital prolapse
- follicular cyst of ovary
- labor
- Lichen simplex chronicus
- Lichen sclerosus
- Lichen planus
- miscarriage
- imperforate hymen
- intraepithelial neoplasia
- labial trauma
- Mittelschmerz
- ovarian apoplexy
- ovarian cyst
- ovarian torsion
- pelvic congestion syndrome
- pelvic inflammatory disease
- Abscess of broad ligament
- Abscess of parametrium
- pelvic cellulitis
- pregnancy
- Sjögren syndrome
- urinary tract infection
- uterine prolapse
- vaginal dryness
- vaginismus
- vesico-uterine pouch
- vulvodynia
- vulva tumor
- vaginal bleeding
- vaginoplasty
- vulvar vestibulitis
- vulvar skin cracks and bleeds
- vulvectomy

== Males ==
- benign prostatic hyperplasia
- chronic prostatitis/chronic pelvic pain syndrome
- deep shaft piercing
- dysuria
- epididymitis
- epididymal hypertension
- spermatocele
- intracavernous injection
- hydrocele
- subcutaneous emphysema
- impaling
- hematocele
- radiation proctitis
- inguinal hernia
- epididymo-orchitis
- Fournier's gangrene
- air embolism
- post-vasectomy pain syndrome
- testicular torsion
- scrotal cellulitis
- Paget's disease of the scrotum
- Peyronie's disease
- impotence
- penis constriction
- retrograde ejaculation
- self-injection of saline solution
- urethral sounding
- urolithiasis
- tamakeri
- testicular cancer
- varicocele
- Injecting air or another gas into the penis
- penile strangulation
- penile incarceration

== Children ==
- child abuse
- dermatitis
- imperforate hymen
- pinworms
- diaper rash or chafing of diaper

== Treatments ==
- Analgesic
- Cordotomy
- Medical lubricant
- Personal lubricant
