= Trimix (drug) =

Treatment for erectile dysfunction

Combination of
- Alprostadil: prostaglandin
- Papaverine: vasodilator
- Phentolamine: alpha blocker

Clinical data
- Routes of administration: injection, intraurethral, topical

Legal status
- Legal status: US: ℞-only

Identifiers
- ChemSpider: none

Trimix is a prescription combination drug containing alprostadil, papaverine, and phentolamine. It is used to treat erectile dysfunction.

== Medical use ==
Trimix is prescribed for erectile dysfunction, typically in men who have not responded adequately to oral PDE5 inhibitors such as sildenafil or tadalafil. There is no standardized dose; the formulation and starting dose are individualized by the prescriber and adjusted (titrated) based on the patient's response, generally beginning with a low dose to reduce the risk of priapism. Onset of action is typically 5–20 minutes, and because the drug acts directly on penile vascular smooth muscle, an erection can occur without sexual stimulation. Use is generally limited to a few times per week with at least 24 hours between injections to reduce the risk of fibrosis at the injection site.

=== Available forms ===
Trimix is available in several different formulations, including a gel that can be used topically, a gel that can be administered into the urethra, and an injectable form that is administered via intracavernosal injection (an injection at either side, not the base, of the penis).

== Adverse effects ==
Adverse effects from injecting Trimix may include pain, fibrosis, hematoma, and priapism (a prolonged erection of the penis).

== Pharmacology ==
Trimix is a combination of three drugs: alprostadil, papaverine, and phentolamine. These medications work in combination to increase blood flow to the penis, resulting in an erection. Alprostadil is a prostaglandin vasodilator that allows more blood to flow into the area by relaxing the smooth muscle in the blood vessels of the penis. Papaverine is a smooth muscle relaxant that acts by increasing blood flow to the penis. Phentolamine is an alpha blocker that relaxes blood vessel muscles, allowing more blood to flow to the penis. Because Trimix is injected directly into the corpus cavernosum in a small localized dose rather than absorbed systemically, it does not produce the systemic PDE5 inhibition of oral agents such as sildenafil or tadalafil, and is therefore not associated with the nasal congestion those drugs can cause.

== Society and culture ==
=== Availability ===
While the active drugs in Trimix have all been individually approved by the U.S. Food and Drug Administration (FDA), Trimix as a combination drug has not been approved by the FDA and is only available from compounding pharmacies. Trimix is typically prepared by the compounding pharmacy in a sterile environment and then frozen. The compound is stable for up to six months while stored frozen and for one month if stored refrigerated beginning at the time of manufacture.
