= Trimix =

Trimix may refer to:

- Trimix (breathing gas), a gas mixture used in deep-sea diving
- Trimix (drug), a combination medication used to treat erectile dysfunction
