= Injection (medicine) =

Method of medication administration

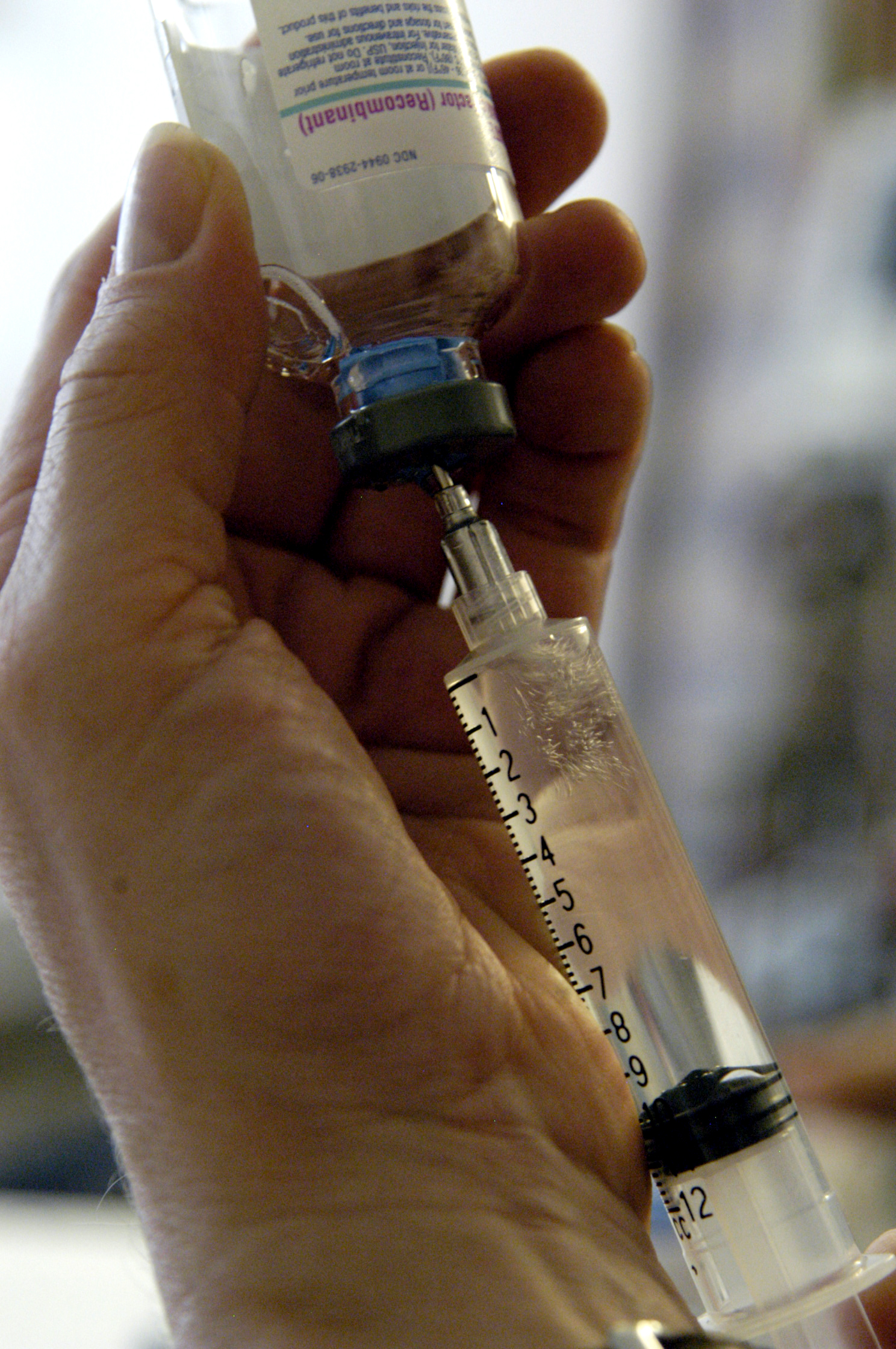
A syringe being prepared for injection of medication

An injection (often and usually referred to as a "shot" in US English, a "jab" in UK English, or a "jag" in Scottish English and Scots) is the act of administering a liquid, especially a drug, into a person's body using a needle (usually a hypodermic needle) and a syringe. An injection is considered a form of parenteral drug administration; it does not involve absorption in the digestive tract. This allows the medication to be absorbed more rapidly and avoid the first pass effect. There are many types of injection, which are generally named after the body tissue the injection is administered into. This includes common injections such as subcutaneous, intramuscular, and intravenous injections, as well as less common injections such as epidural, intraperitoneal, intraosseous, intracardiac, intraarticular, and intracavernous injections.

Injections are among the most common health care procedures, with at least 16 billion administered in developing and transitional countries each year. Of these, 95% are used in curative care or as treatment for a condition, 3% are to provide immunizations/vaccinations, and the rest are used for other purposes, including blood transfusions. The term injection is sometimes used synonymously with inoculation, but injection does not only refer to the act of inoculation. Injections generally administer a medication as a bolus (or one-time) dose, but can also be used for continuous drug administration. After injection, a medication may be designed to be released slowly, called a depot injection, which can produce long-lasting effects.

An injection necessarily causes a small puncture wound to the body, and thus may cause localized pain or infection. The occurrence of these side effects varies based on injection location, the substance injected, needle gauge, procedure, and individual sensitivity. Rarely, more serious side effects including gangrene, sepsis, and nerve damage may occur. Fear of needles, also called needle phobia, is also common and may result in anxiety and fainting before, during, or after an injection. To prevent the localized pain that occurs with injections the injection site may be numbed or cooled before injection and the person receiving the injection may be distracted by a conversation or similar means. To reduce the risk of infection from injections, proper aseptic technique should be followed to clean the injection site before administration. If needles or syringes are reused between people, or if an accidental needlestick occurs, there is a risk of transmission of bloodborne diseases such as HIV and hepatitis.

Unsafe injection practices contribute to the spread of bloodborne diseases, especially in less-developed countries. To combat this, safety syringes exist which contain features to prevent accidental needlestick injury and reuse of the syringe after it is used once. Furthermore, recreational drug users who use injections to administer the drugs commonly share or reuse needles after an injection. This has led to the development of needle exchange programs and safe injection sites as a public health measure, which may provide new, sterile syringes and needles to discourage the reuse of syringes and needles. Used needles should ideally be placed in a purpose-made sharps container which is safe and resistant to puncture. Some locations provide free disposal programs for such containers for their citizens.

== Types ==
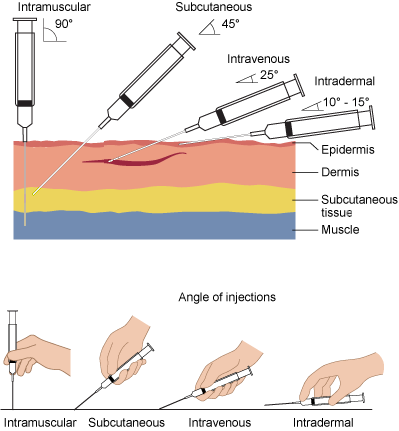
Needle insertion angles for 4 types of injection: intramuscular, subcutaneous, intravenous, and intradermal

Injections are classified in multiple ways, including the type of tissue being injected into, the location in the body the injection is designed to produce effects, and the duration of the effects. Regardless of classification, injections require a puncture to be made, necessitating sterile environments and procedures to minimize the risk of introducing pathogens into the body. All injections are considered forms of parenteral administration, which avoids the first pass metabolism which would potentially affect a medication absorbed through the gastrointestinal tract.

=== Systemic ===
Many injections are designed to administer a medication which has an effect throughout the body. Systemic injections may be used when a person cannot take medicine by mouth, or when the medication itself would not be absorbed into circulation from the gastrointestinal tract. Medications administered via a systemic injection will enter into blood circulation, either directly or indirectly, and thus will have an effect on the entire body.

==== Intravenous ====
Intravenous injections, abbreviated as IV, involve inserting a needle into a vein, allowing a substance to be delivered directly into the bloodstream. An intravenous injection provides the quickest onset of the desired effects because the substance immediately enters the blood, and is quickly circulated to the rest of the body. Because the substance is administered directly into the bloodstream, there is no delay in the onset of effects due to the absorption of the substance into the bloodstream. This type of injection is the most common and is used frequently for administration of medications in an inpatient setting.

Another use for intravenous injections includes for the administration of nutrition to people who cannot get nutrition through the digestive tract. This is termed parenteral nutrition and may provide all or only part of a person's nutritional requirements. Parenteral nutrition may be pre-mixed or customized for a person's specific needs. Intravenous injections may also be used for recreational drugs when a rapid onset of effects is desired.

==== Intramuscular ====
Intramuscular injections, abbreviated as IM, deliver a substance deep into a muscle, where they are quickly absorbed by the blood vessels into systemic circulation. Common injection sites include the deltoid, vastus lateralis, and ventrogluteal muscles. Medical professionals are trained to give IM injections, but people who are not medical professionals can also be trained to administer medications like epinephrine using an autoinjector in an emergency. Some depot injections are also administered intramuscularly, including medroxyprogesterone acetate among others. In addition to medications, most inactivated vaccines, including the influenza vaccine, are given as an IM injection.

==== Subcutaneous ====
Subcutaneous injections, abbreviated as SC or sub-Q, consist of injecting a substance via a needle under the skin. Absorption of the medicine from this tissue is slower than in an intramuscular injection. Since the needle does not need to penetrate to the level of the muscle, a thinner and shorter needle can be used. Subcutaneous injections may be administered in the fatty tissue behind the upper arm, in the abdomen, or in the thigh. Certain medications, including epinephrine, may be used either intramuscularly or subcutaneously. Others, such as insulin, are almost exclusively injected subcutaneously. Live or attenuated vaccines, including the MMR vaccine (measles, mumps, rubella), varicella vaccine (chickenpox), and zoster vaccine (shingles) are also injected subcutaneously.

==== Intradermal ====
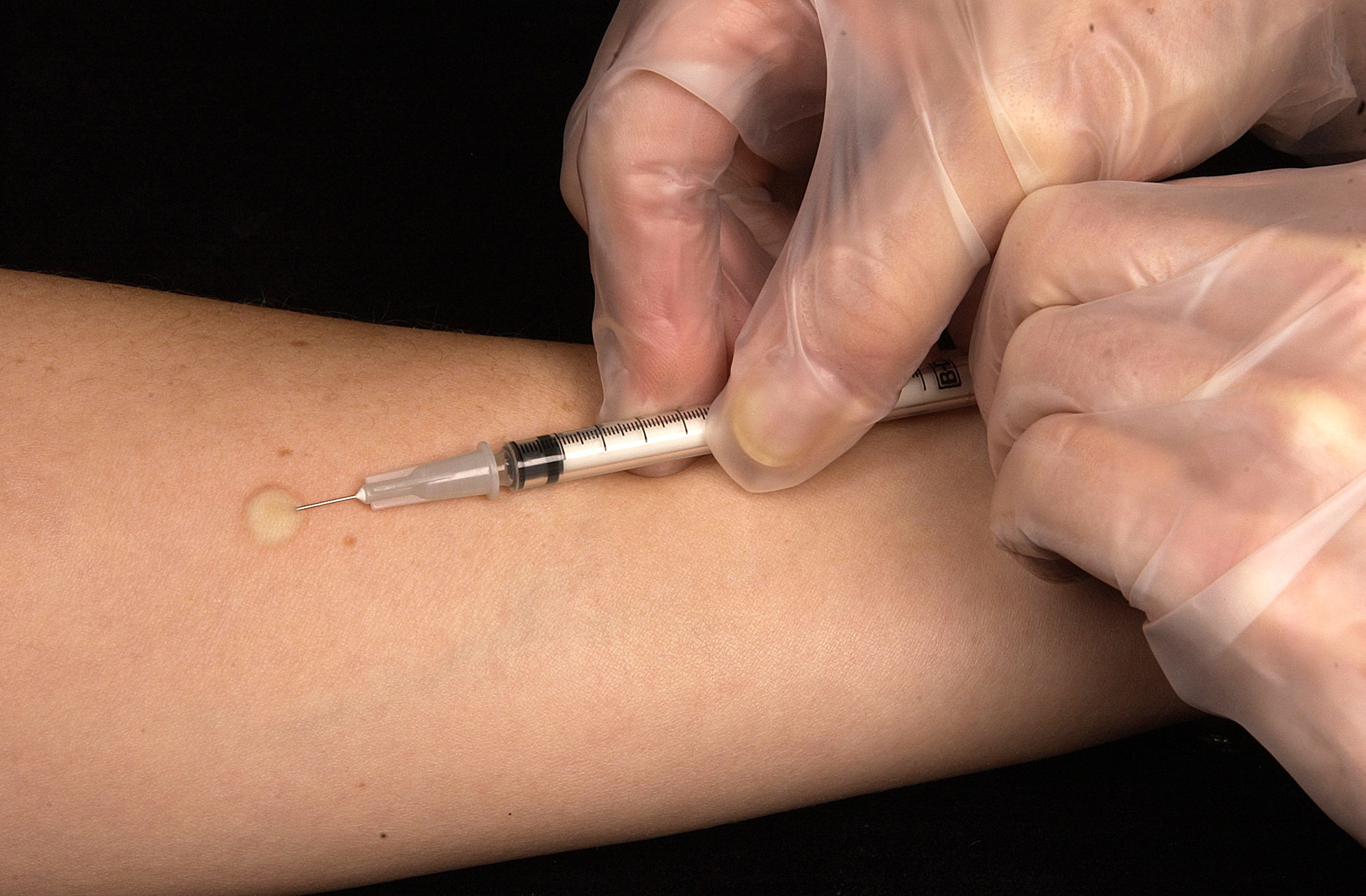
A tuberculin sensitivity test being administered intradermally

Intradermal injections, abbreviated as ID, consist of a substance delivered into the dermis, the layer of skin above the subcutaneous fat layer, but below the epidermis or top layer. An intradermal injection is administered with the needle placed almost flat against the skin, at a 5 to 15 degree angle. Absorption from an intradermal injection takes longer than when the injection is given intravenously, intramuscularly, or subcutaneously. For this reason, few medications are administered intradermally. Intradermal injections are most commonly used for sensitivity tests, including tuberculin skin tests and allergy tests, as well as sensitivity tests to medications a person has never had before. The reactions caused by tests which use intradermal injection are more easily seen due to the location of the injection, and when positive will present as a red or swollen area. Common sites of intradermal injections include the forearm and lower back.

==== Intraosseous ====
An intraosseous injection or infusion is the act of administering medication through a needle inserted into the bone marrow of a large bone. This method of administration is only used when it is not possible to maintain access through a less invasive method such as an intravenous line, either due to frequent loss of access due to a collapsed vessel, or due to the difficulty of finding a suitable vein to use in the first place. Intraosseous access is commonly obtained by inserting a needle into the bone marrow of the humerus or tibia, and is generally only considered once multiple attempts at intravenous access have failed, as it is a more invasive method of administration than an IV. With the exception of occasional differences in the accuracy of blood tests when drawn from an intraosseous line, it is considered to be equivalent in efficacy to IV access. It is most commonly used in emergency situations where there is not ample time to repeatedly attempt to obtain IV access, or in younger people for whom obtaining IV access is more difficult.

=== Localized ===
Injections may be performed into specific parts of the body when the medication's effects are desired to be limited to a specific location, or where systemic administration would produce undesirable side effects which may be avoided by a more directed injection.

Injections to the corpus cavernosum of the penis, termed intracavernous injections, may be used to treat conditions which are localized to the penis. They can be self-administered for erectile dysfunction prior to intercourse or used in a healthcare setting for emergency treatment for a prolonged erection with an injection to either remove blood from the penis or to administer a sympathomimetic medication to reduce the erection. Intracavernosal injections of alprostadil may be used by people for whom other treatments such as PDE5 inhibitors are ineffective or contraindicated. Other medications may also be administered in this way, including papaverine, phentolamine, and aviptadil. The most common adverse effects of intercavernosal injections include fibrosis and pain, as well as hematomas or bruising around the injection site.

Medications may also be administered by injecting them directly into the vitreous humor of the eye. This is termed an intravitreal injection, and may be used to treat endophthalmitis (an infection of the inner eye), macular degeneration, and macular edema. An intravitreal injection is performed by injecting a medication through the pupil into the vitreous humor core of the eye after applying a local anesthetic drop to numb the eye and a mydriatic drop to dilate the pupil. They are commonly used in lieu of systemic administration to both increase the concentrations present in the eye, as well as avoid systemic side effects of medications.

When an effect is only required in one joint, a joint injection (or intra-articular injection) may be administered into the articular space surrounding the joint. These injections can range from a one-time dose of a steroid to help with pain and inflammation to complete replacement of the synovial fluid with a compound such as hyaluronic acid. The injection of a steroid into a joint is used to reduce inflammation associated with conditions such as osteoarthritis, and the effects may last for up to 6 months following a single injection. Hyaluronic acid injection is used to supplement the body's natural synovial fluid and decrease the friction and stiffness of the joint. Administering a joint injection generally involves the use of an ultrasound or other live imaging technique to ensure the injection is administered in the desired location, as well as to reduce the risk of damaging surrounding tissues.

=== Long-acting ===
Long-acting injectable (LAI) formulations of medications are not intended to have a rapid effect, but instead release a medication at a predictable rate continuously over a period of time. Both depot injections and solid injectable implants are used to increase adherence to therapy by reducing the frequency at which a person must take a medication.

==== Depot ====
A depot injection is an injection, usually subcutaneous, intradermal, or intramuscular, that deposits a drug in a localized mass, called a depot, from which it is gradually absorbed by surrounding tissue. Such injection allows the active compound to be released in a consistent way over a long period. Depot injections are usually either oil-based or an aqueous suspension. Depot injections may be available as certain salt forms of a drug, such as decanoate salts or esters. Examples of depot injections include haloperidol decanoate, medroxyprogesterone acetate, and naltrexone.

==== Implant ====
Injections may also be used to insert a solid or semi-solid into the body which releases a medication slowly over time. These implants are generally designed to be temporary, replaceable, and ultimately removed at the end of their use or when replaced. There are multiple contraceptive implants marketed for different active ingredients, as well as differing duration of action - most of these are injected under the skin. A form of buprenorphine for the treatment of opioid dependence is also available as an injectable implant. Various materials can be used to manufacture implants including biodegradable polymers, osmotic release systems, and small spheres which dissolve in the body.

== Adverse effects ==
=== Pain ===
The act of piercing the skin with a needle, while necessary for an injection, also may cause localized pain. The most common technique to reduce the pain of an injection is simply to distract the person receiving the injection. Pain may be dampened by prior application of ice or topical anesthetic, or pinching of the skin while giving the injection. Some studies also suggest that forced coughing during an injection stimulates a transient rise in blood pressure which inhibits the perception of pain. For some injections, especially deeper injections, a local anesthetic is given. When giving an injection to young children or infants, they may be distracted by giving them a small amount of sweet liquid, such as sugar solution, or be comforted by breastfeeding during the injection, which reduces crying.

=== Infection ===
A needle tract infection, also called a needlestick infection, is an infection that occurs when pathogens are inadvertently introduced into the tissues of the body during an injection. Contamination of the needle used for injection, or reuse of needles for injections in multiple people, can lead to transmission of hepatitis B and C, HIV, and other bloodstream infections. Injection drug users have high rates of unsafe needle use including sharing needles between people. The spread of HIV, Hepatitis B, and Hepatitis C from injection drug use is a common health problem, in particular contributing to over half of new HIV cases in North America in 1994.

Other infections may occur when pathogens enter the body through the injection site, most commonly due to improper cleaning of the site before injection. Infections occurring in this way are mainly localized infections, including skin infections, skin structure infections, abscesses, or gangrene. An intravenous injection may also result in a bloodstream infection (termed sepsis) if the injection site is not cleaned properly prior to insertion. Sepsis is a life-threatening condition which requires immediate treatment.

=== Others ===
Injections into the skin and soft tissue generally do not cause any permanent damage, and the puncture heals within a few days. However, in some cases, injections can cause long-term adverse effects. Intravenous and intramuscular injections may cause damage to a nerve, leading to palsy or paralysis. Intramuscular injections may cause fibrosis or contracture. Injections also cause localized bleeding, which may lead to a hematoma. Intravenous injections may also cause phlebitis, especially when multiple injections are given in a vein over a short period of time. Infiltration and extravasation may also occur when a medication intended to be injected into a vein is inadvertently injected into surrounding tissues. Those who are afraid of needles may also experience fainting at the sight of a needle, or before or after an injection.

== Technique ==
Proper needle use is important to perform injections safely, which includes the use of a new, sterile needle for each injection. This is partly because needles get duller with each use and partly because reusing needles increases risk of infection. Needles should not be shared between people, as this increases risk of transmitting blood-borne pathogens. The practice of using the same needle for multiple people increases the risk of disease transmission between people sharing the same medication. In addition, it is not recommended to reuse a used needle to pierce a medication bag, bottle, or ampule designed to provide multiple doses of a medication, instead a new needle should be used each time the container must be pierced. Aseptic technique should always be practiced when administering injections. This includes the use of barriers including gloves, gowns, and masks for health care providers. It also requires the use of a new, sterile needle, syringe and other equipment for each injection, as well as proper training to avoid touching non-sterile surfaces with sterile items.

To help prevent accidental needlestick injury to the person administering the injection, and prevent reuse of the syringe for another injection, a safety syringe and needle may be used. The most basic reuse prevention device is an "auto-disable" plunger, which once pressed past a certain point will no longer retract. Another common safety feature is an auto-retractable needle, where the needle is spring-loaded and either retracts into the syringe after injection, or into a plastic sheath on the side of the syringe. Other safety syringes have an attached sheath which may be moved to cover the end of the needle after the injection is given. The World Health Organization recommends the use of single-use syringes with both reuse prevention devices and a needlestick injury prevention mechanism for all injections to prevent accidental injury and disease transmission.

Novel injection techniques include drug diffusion within the skin using needle-free micro-jet injection (NFI) technology.

=== Disposal of used needles ===
Used needles should be disposed of in specifically designed sharps containers to reduce the risk of accidental needle sticks and exposure to other people. In addition, a new sharps container should be begun once it is 3/4 full. A sharps container which is 3/4 filled should be sealed properly to prevent re-opening or accidental opening during transportation. Some locations offer publicly accessible "sharps take-back" programs where a sharps container may be dropped off to a public location for safe disposal at no fee to the person. In addition, some pharmaceutical and independent companies provide mail-back sharps programs, sometimes for an additional fee. In the United States, there are 39 states that offer programs to provide needle or syringe exchange.

Over half of non-industrialized countries report open burning of disposed or used syringes. This practice is considered unsafe by the World Health Organization.

=== Aspiration ===
The aspiration is the technique of pulling back on the plunger of a syringe prior to the actual injection. If blood flows into the syringe it signals that a blood vessel has been hit.

== Society and culture ==
Due to the prevalence of unsafe injection practices, especially among injection drug users, many locations have begun offering supervised injection sites and needle exchange programs, which may be offered separately or colocated. These programs may provide new sterile needles upon request to mitigate infection risk, and some also provide access to on-site clinicians and emergency medical care if it becomes required. In the event of an overdose, a site may also provide medications such as naloxone, used as an antidote in opioid overdose situations, or other antidotes or emergency care. Safe injection site have been associated with lower rates of death from overdose, less ambulance calls, and lower rates of new HIV infections from unsafe needle practices.

As of 2024, at least ten countries currently offer safe injection sites, including Australia, Canada, the United States, Denmark, France, Germany, Luxembourg, The Netherlands, Norway, Spain and Switzerland. In total, there are at least 120 sites operating.

== Plants and animals ==
Many species of animals use injections for self-defence or catching prey. This includes venomous snakes which inject venom when they bite into the skin with their fangs. Common substances present in snake venom include neurotoxins, toxic proteins, and cytotoxic enzymes. Different species of snakes inject different formulations of venom, which may cause severe pain and necrosis before progressing into neurotoxicity and potentially death. The weever is a type of fish which has venomous spines covering its fins and gills and injects a venom consisting of proteins which cause a severe local reaction which is not life-threatening. Sting rays use their spinal blade to inject a protein-based venom which causes localized cell death but is not generally life-threatening.

Some types of insects also utilize injection for various purposes. Bees use a stinger located in their hind region to inject a venom consisting of proteins such as melittin, which causes a localized painful and itching reaction. Leeches can inject an anticoagulant peptide called hirudin after attaching to prevent blood from clotting during feeding. This property of leeches has been used historically as a natural form of anticoagulation therapy, as well as for the use of bloodletting as a treatment for various ailments. Some species of ants inject forms of venom which include compounds which produce minor pain such as the formic acid, which is injected by members of the Formicinae subfamily. Other species of ants, including Dinoponera species, inject protein-based venom which causes severe pain but is still not life-threatening. The bullet ant (Paraponera clavata) injects a venom which contains a neurotoxin named poneratoxin which causes extreme pain, fever, and cold sweats, and may cause arrhythmias.

Plants may use a form of injection which is passive, where the injectee pushes themselves against the stationary needle. The stinging nettle plant has many trichomes, or stinging hairs, over its leaves and stems which are used to inject a mix of irritating chemicals which includes histamine, serotonin, and acetylcholine. This sting produces a form of dermatitis which is characterized by a stinging, burning, and itching sensation in the area. Dendrocnide species, also called stinging trees, use their trichomes to inject a mix of neurotoxic peptides which causes a reaction similar to the stinging nettle, but also may result in recurring flares for a much longer period after the injection. While some plants have thorns, spines, and prickles, these generally are not used for injection of any substance, but instead it is the act of piercing the skin which causes them to be a deterrent.

== See also ==
- Dart injection
- Jet injector
- Injection port
- Lethal injection
- Needlestick injury
- Needle remover
- Safety syringe
- Trypanophobia
