= Edex =

Edex can refer to several institutions:

- EDEX, education and career guidance project.
- Edex Live, a newspaper
- Prostaglandin E1, medication
