= Penile pain =

Pain in the penis

Penile pain refers to pain in the penis of human or otherwise.

== Common causes ==
- Penile injury
- Circumcision
- Penile fracture
- Priapism
- Phimosis
- Peyronie's disease
- Sexually transmitted infections
- Chronic prostatitis/chronic pelvic pain syndrome

== Cultural references ==
Priapus, a minor Greek god of fertility, is marked by his oversized, permanent erection, which gave rise to the medical term priapism.

== See also ==
- Genital pain
- Vaginal pain
- Testicular pain
