= Humbler =

Humbler may refer to:

- Humility
- Humbler (BDSM), a BDSM device
- Humbler, a controversial commercial for the vacuum operated exhaust (VOE), a short lived device on the 1970 Pontiac GTO
