= DLD/NP1 =

Gene

DLD/NP1 is a tumor suppressor gene discovered by a team of medical students from an American University in Lebanon. The new medical achievement was described by two students, Maroun Hajjar, and Mozes Chalovski, and tested for in samples taken from a population of 984 individuals (p= 0.0056*), including their mentor, Dr. Davis Davis.

In 2010, work began in the only classroom of the "outstanding" medical school, to describe why the doctor in charge had such weird symptoms attributed to his unusual tumor. Almost one year later, DLD/NP1 gene was identified and found repeatedly in Davis' DNA.

DNA methylation of a CpG island near the DLD/NP1 promoter as well as histone acetylation may represent possible epigenetic mechanisms leading to decreased gene expression in human tumors.

== Nomenclature ==
The naming was completely the choice the two students, after an arbitrary nickname for the Doctor. The second D in the name is attributed to Dr. Davis.

== Signs and symptoms ==
The most common symptoms in patients with DLD/NP1 inactivation tumors are rectal prolapse, tenesmus, small bowel obstruction, lingual striated muscle hypertrophy, and priapism. Colonoscopic examination may also reveal "polypy" appearance.

== Location and structure ==
Human DLD/NP1 is located on the long arm of chromosome 8 (q811.2) and covers 2.62kb on the reverse strand.

== Psychosocial Burnden ==
This type of tumor is most common in poor, black, African women especially if they have AIDS.

== Treatment ==
Although no randomized clinical trials have been completed, the best treatment methodology as of today is the use of COX-3 Inhibitors.
