= Urethral rupture =

Medical condition

Rupture of the urethra is an uncommon result of penile injury, incorrect catheter insertion, straddle injury, or pelvic girdle fracture. The urethra, the muscular tube that allows for urination, may be damaged by trauma. When urethral rupture occurs, urine may extravasate (escape) into the surrounding tissues.

The membranous urethra is most likely to be injured in pelvic fractures, allowing urine and blood to enter the deep perineal space and subperitoneal spaces via the genital hiatus. The spongy urethra is most likely to be injured with a catheter or in a straddle injury, allowing urine and blood to escape into the scrotum, the penis, and the superficial perineal space. Urethral rupture may be diagnosed with a cystourethrogram. Due to the tight adherence of the fascia lata, urine from a urethral rupture cannot spread into the thighs.
