= Combined intracavernous injection and stimulation test =

- Synonyms: CIS test

Combined intracavernous injection and stimulation test or CIS test is the most commonly performed office diagnostic procedure for erectile dysfunction. It consists of an intracavernosal injection, visual or manual sexual stimulation, and a rating of the subsequent erection. Neurogenic and hormonal influences are thus bypassed as the status of the blood vessels of the penis is assessed directly and objectively. A rigid erection of more than 10 minutes indicates normal function of veins. The same conclusion cannot be made for the function of arteries as some men with mild arterial problems can also have the same response.
