= Dart injection =

A dart injection is used to give a single intramuscular or subcutaneous injection to livestock, wildlife, exotic animals, or ferals without restraining the animal. It can be contrasted with hand injection. These injections are usually administered by a dart gun, if in the wild, or sometimes a blowgun if in captivity.
