= Persistent genital arousal disorder =

Arousal of the genitalia in the absence of sexual desire

- Other names: PGAD
- Specialty: Sexology, neurology

Persistent genital arousal disorder (PGAD), originally called persistent sexual arousal syndrome (PSAS), is spontaneous, persistent, unwanted and uncontrollable genital arousal in the absence of sexual stimulation or sexual desire, and is typically not relieved by orgasm. Instead, multiple orgasms over hours or days may be required for relief.

PGAD occurs in people of both sexes. It has been compared to priapism in male and female genitalia. PGAD is rare and is not well understood. The literature is inconsistent with the nomenclature. It is distinguished from hypersexuality, which is characterized as heightened sexual desire.

== Classification ==
In 2003, "persistent genital arousal" was considered for inclusion with regard to the International Consultation on Sexual Medicine (ICSM). In 2009, "persistent genital arousal dysfunction" was included in its third edition. PGAD is not included in the Diagnostic and Statistical Manual of Mental Disorders (DSM-5) or the International Classification of Diseases (ICD-10), which may be due to the disorder requiring further research.

The condition has been characterized by a researcher as being a term with no scientific basis. There is concern that the title may be misleading because, since the genital arousal is unwanted, it is dubious to characterize it as arousal.

Other researchers have suggested that the disorder be renamed "persistent genital vasocongestion disorder (PGVD)" or "restless genital syndrome (ReGS)".

== Signs and symptoms ==
Physical arousal caused by PGAD can be very intense and persist for extended periods, days, weeks or years at a time. Symptoms may include pressure, pain, vibrating, pleasure, irritation, clitoral or penile tingling, throbbing, vaginal congestion, vaginal contractions, penile spasms, arousal, clitoral or penile erections, and prolonged spontaneous orgasms. Pressure, pleasure, discomfort, pounding, pulsating, throbbing or engorgement may include the clitoris, penis, labia, vagina, perineum, or the anus. The symptoms may result from sexual activity or from no identified stimulus, and are not relieved by a single orgasm; instead, multiple strong orgasms over hours, days, or weeks are needed for short term relief. The symptoms can impede home or work life. Women and men may feel embarrassment or shame, and avoid sexual relationships, because of the disorder. Stress can make the symptoms worse.

== Cause ==
Researchers do not know the cause of PGAD, but assume that it has neurological, vascular, pharmacological, and psychological causes. Tarlov cysts have been speculated as a cause. PGAD has been associated with clitoral priapism, and has been compared to priapism in men. It is also similar to vulvodynia, in that the causes for both are not well understood, both last for a long time, and women with either condition may be told that it is psychological rather than physical. It has been additionally associated with restless legs syndrome (RLS), but only in a minority of women, as well as men.

In some recorded cases, the syndrome was caused by or can cause a pelvic arterial-venous malformation with arterial branches to the clitoris. Surgical treatment was effective in this instance. There is evidence that some drugs such as SSRIs and SNRIs might induce or worsen PGAD.

== Diagnosis ==
The following five criteria must be met by patients in order to be diagnosed with PGAD:

1. Typical physiological responses from sexual arousal persist for an extended amount of time and do not cease on their own
2. Feelings of arousal remain even after orgasm or multiple orgasms are needed to lessen the arousal
3. Arousal is experienced without desire or sexual excitement
4. Arousal occurs with both sexual and non-sexual stimuli or with no stimuli
5. Symptoms are intrusive, unwanted, and cause distress

== Treatment ==
Because PGAD has only been researched since 2001, there is little documenting what may cure or remedy the disorder. Treatment may include extensive psychotherapy, psycho-education, and pelvic floor physical therapy. In one case, serendipitous relief of symptoms was concluded from treatment with varenicline, a treatment for nicotine addiction. It was reported in a study that repeated masturbation (51%), strong or prolonged orgasms (50%), distraction (39%), intercourse (36%), exercise (25%), and cold compresses (13%) were the most relieving treatments that could be done without the help of a professional.

Having a team of professionals such as a medical provider, a pelvic floor physical therapist, massage therapist and sex therapist has been shown to aid patients. One study found that, after working with professionals, patients felt validated, listened to, and that their sexual function had improved. Many patients felt practicing mindfulness allowed them to adjust to living with PGAD by recognizing thoughts and emotions corresponding to the symptoms and avoiding brooding over them. This treatment method focuses on reducing the anxiety that is caused by the condition and pushes the patient to develop effective distraction and relaxation techniques.

== Epidemiology ==
PGAD is believed to affect about 1% of women; it is considered even rarer in men. Although online surveys have indicated that hundreds of women and men may have PGAD, documented case studies have been limited.

== History ==
The earliest references to PGAD may be Greek descriptions of hypersexuality (previously known as "satyriasis" and "nymphomania"), which confused persistent genital arousal with sexual insatiability. While PGAD involves the absence of sexual desire, hypersexuality is characterized as heightened sexual desire.

The term persistent sexual arousal syndrome was coined by researchers Leiblum and Nathan in 2001. In 2006, Leiblum renamed the condition to "persistent genital arousal disorder" to indicate that genital arousal sensations are different from those that result from true sexual arousal. The rename was also considered to give the condition a better chance of being classified as a dysfunction. Now PGAD is often called or termed Genito-Pelvic Dysesthesia.

== Impact on mental health ==
Women and men with PGAD report having unstable mental health with thoughts of suicide and difficulty completing daily activities. Most people that have PGAD report having to masturbate 6, 20 or even more times a day and may have to use many types of sexual devices to experience any type of relief from symptoms. Many people are afraid to leave their homes due to fears that PGAD symptoms may flare up while in public and they will not be able to wait until they are able to relieve themselves. This disorder can become so debilitating and devastating that at least one female patient is known to have committed suicide in 2012.

Before the start of their PGAD, many women were seen to have higher stress scores as well as symptoms of depression and anxiety. Panic attacks (31.6%) and major depression (57.9%) were reported commonalities between patients occurring at least one year prior to the onset of PGAD symptoms. Up to 45% of women and men with the disorder have reported having a history with antidepressants.

A small study found that several women and men began to see symptoms of PGAD after discontinuing the use of their selective serotonin reuptake inhibitors. It is not known whether reintroduction of the SSRIs would improve PGAD symptoms.

== See also ==
- Delayed ejaculation
- Female sexual arousal disorder
- List of causes of genital pain
- Postorgasmic illness syndrome
- Sexual dysfunction
- Vaginismus
