= Pneumoscrotum =

- Specialty: Urology

Pneumoscrotum is an uncommon ailment that presents as an enlarged scrotal sac. The buildup of gas or air in the scrotum causes the swelling. Pneumoscrotum refers to two specific conditions: scrotal pneumatocele and scrotal emphysema with palpable crepitus. Pneumoscrotum can arise from a variety of sources, including infections and the dispersal of gas or air from far-off organs or areas.

== Causes ==
Pneumoscrotum is most commonly caused by iatrogenic factors (colonic perforation following endoscopic polypectomy) and traumatic factors (thoracic trauma). Additionally, spontaneous causes of pneumoscrotum include gas-producing bacterial infections, spontaneous pneumothorax, and perforation of hollow abdominal organs.

== Mechanism ==
There are three possible physiopathological explanations for pneumoscrotum. One is that the infection may be brought on by bacteria that produce gas, which allows air to enter the scrotum directly or diffuse through subcutaneous tissues (such as FG). The existence of an air layer in the abdominal cavity is another possible mechanism. This air could diffuse into the scrotum through various peritoneal defects or the fascial planes. Finally, through direct communication, the sternocostal margin of the diaphragm may permit the diffusion of an air layer to the pelvis and abdominal hollow.

== Diagnosis ==
CT, X-rays, and magnetic resonance (MR) scans are used to determine the underlying cause to treat the patient. Finding the source of air coming from an abdominal or thoracic source is made much easier with the help of radiological imaging.

== See also ==
- Pneumatocele
- Scrotal inflation
