= Jugum penis =

Anti-masturbation device

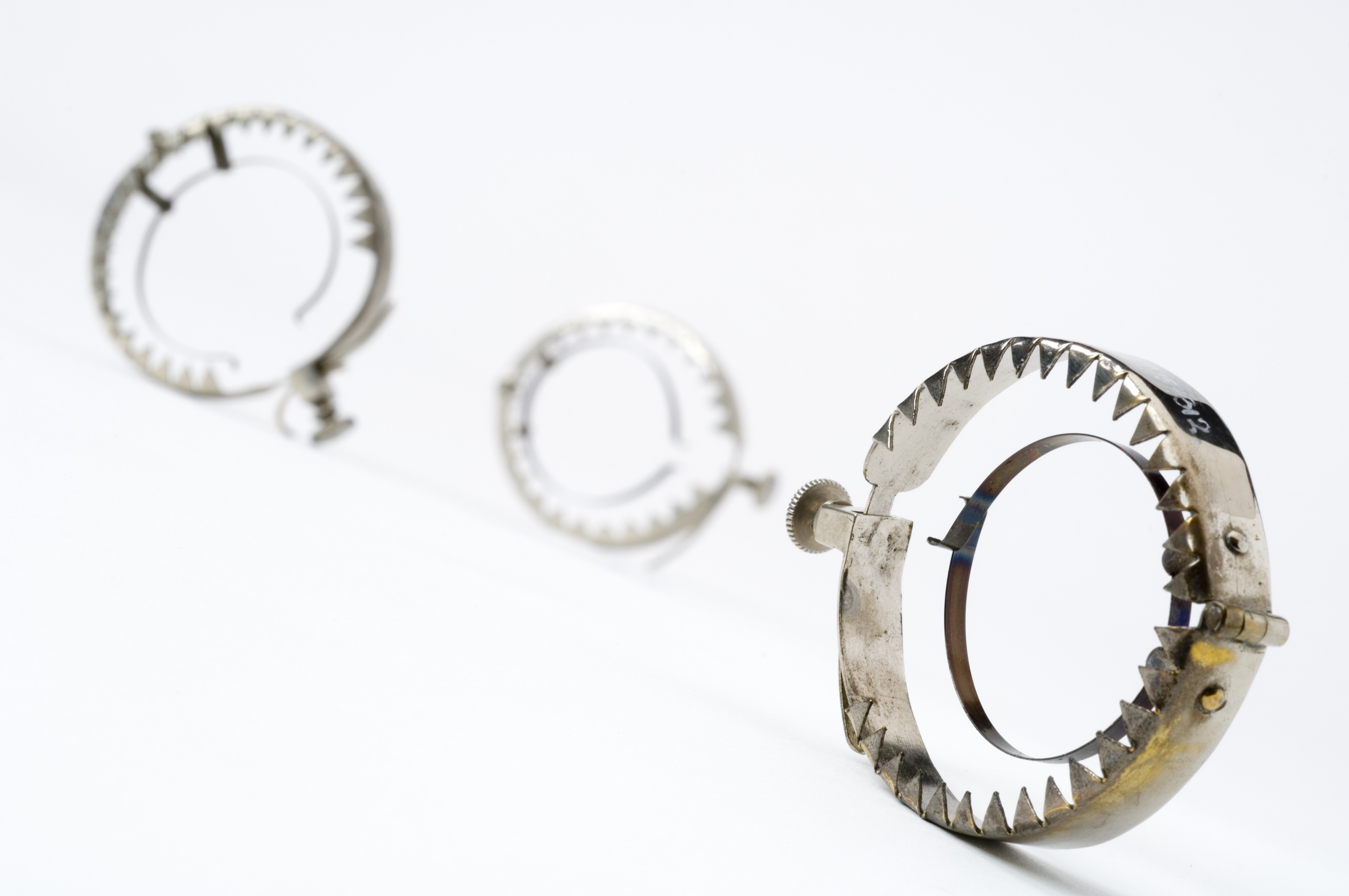
Male anti-masturbation devices, otherwise known as a jugum penis.

The jugum penis or pollutions ring was an anti-masturbatory device developed in the 18th century. It consisted of a steel clip with serrated teeth that could be attached to the penis to deter its unwanted erection. It is one of many devices from the 1700s designed to prevent masturbation and to cure an illness that was then called spermatorrhoea.

A modern equivalent, called Kali's Teeth, is used for sadomasochistic purposes.
