= Scrotal inflation =

Sexual practice

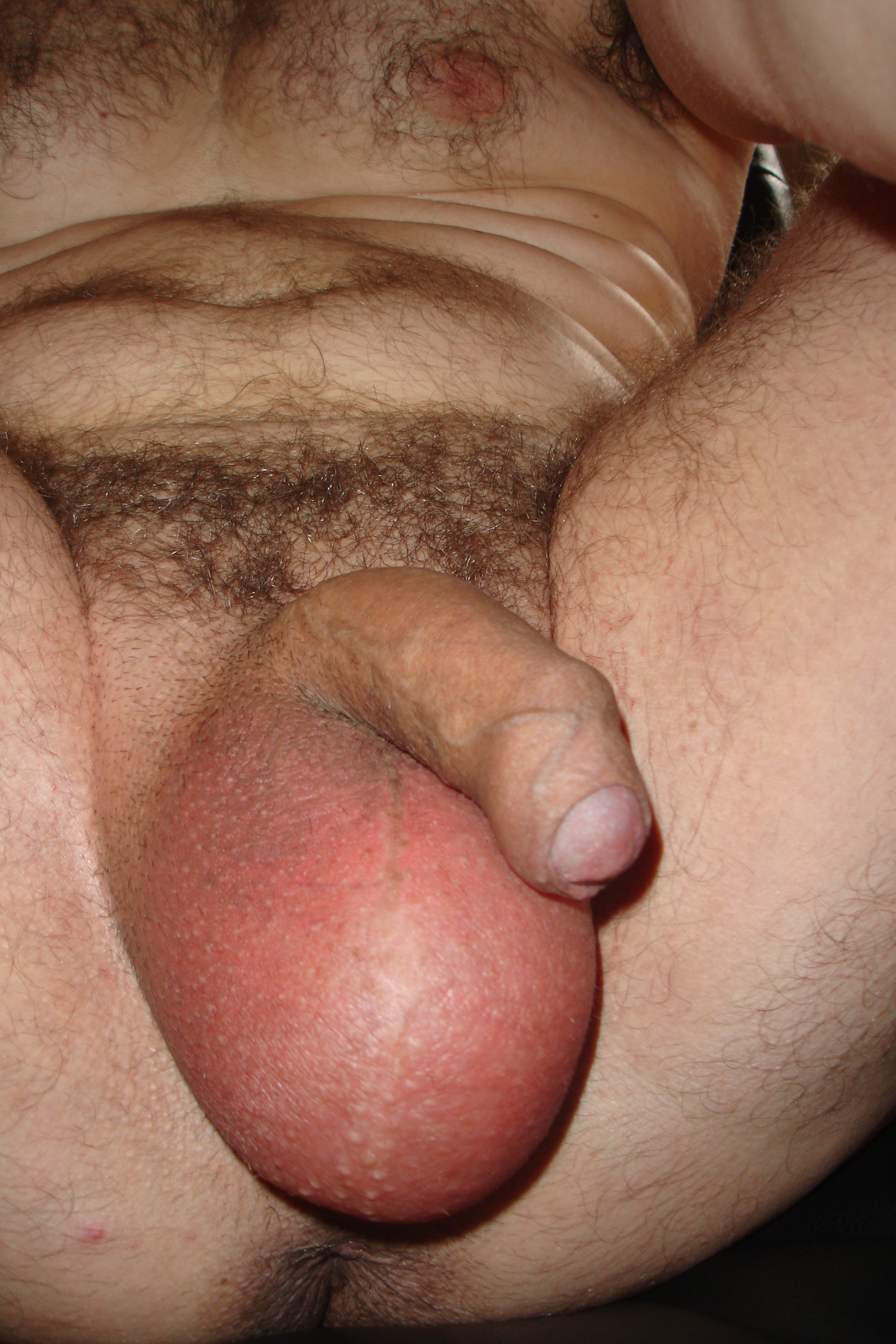
Scrotal inflation

Scrotal inflation or scrotal infusion is a sexual practice in which fluid (typically saline solution, but sometimes air or another gas) is injected into the scrotum in order to make it balloon in size. It carries a number of risks of serious complications, including scrotal cellulitis and subcutaneous emphysema, and possibly fatal complications such as Fournier's gangrene or air embolism.

== See also ==
- Cock and ball torture
- Hydrocele
- Medical fetish
- Pneumoscrotum
