= Prostaglandin E1 =

Chemical compound

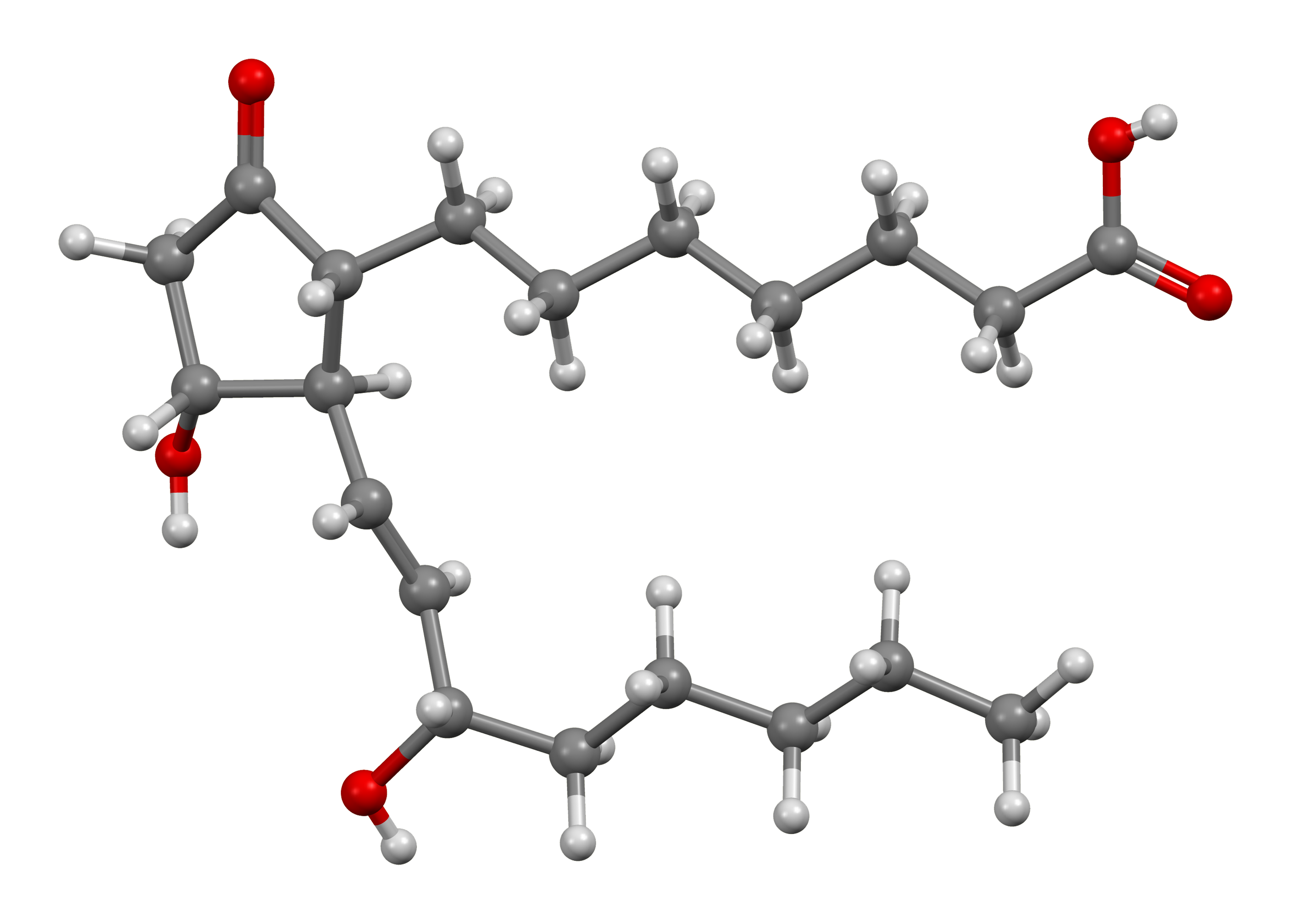

Clinical data
- Trade names: Caverject, Muse, others
- AHFS/Drugs.com: Monograph
- MedlinePlus: a695022
- License data: US DailyMed: Alprostadil
- Routes of administration: Intravenous, intracavernous
- ATC code: C01EA01 (WHO) G04BE01 (WHO)

Legal status
- Legal status: AU: S4 (Prescription only); CA: ℞-only; UK: POM (Prescription only); US: ℞-only

Identifiers
- IUPAC name: 7-[(1R,3R)-3-hydroxy-2-[(1E,3S)-3-hydroxyoct-1-en-1-yl]-5-oxocyclopentyl]heptanoic acid
- CAS Number: 745-65-3
- PubChem CID: 5280723
- IUPHAR/BPS: 1882
- DrugBank: DB00770
- ChemSpider: 4444306
- UNII: F5TD010360
- KEGG: C04741
- ChEBI: CHEBI:15544
- ChEMBL: ChEMBL495
- CompTox Dashboard (EPA): DTXSID9022578
- ECHA InfoCard: 100.010.925

Chemical and physical data
- Formula: C_{20}H_{34}O_{5}
- Molar mass: 354.487 g·mol^{−1}
- 3D model (JSmol): Interactive image
- SMILES: CCCCC[C@@H](/C=C/[C@H]1[C@@H](CC(=O)[C@@H]1CCCCCCC(=O)O)O)O
- InChI: InChI=1S/C20H34O5/c1-2-3-6-9-15(21)12-13-17-16(18(22)14-19(17)23)10-7-4-5-8-11-20(24)25/h12-13,15-17,19,21,23H,2-11,14H2,1H3,(H,24,25)/b13-12+/t15-,16+,17+,19+/m0/s1; Key:GMVPRGQOIOIIMI-DWKJAMRDSA-N

Prostaglandin E_{1} (PGE_{1}) is a naturally occurring prostaglandin with various medical uses. Alprostadil and misoprostol are synthetic forms of prostaglandin E1 used as medications. Lubiprostone, a derivative of prostaglandin E1, is also used as a medication. Prostaglandin E_{1} is a vasodilator. It has various effects in the body that include opening blood vessels, relaxing smooth muscle, inhibiting clotting, and causing uterine contractions.

In infants with certain congenital heart defects, alprostadil is delivered by slow injection into a vein to maintain a patent ductus arteriosus until surgery can be carried out. By injection into the penis or placement in the urethra, alprostadil is used to treat erectile dysfunction. Common side effects when given to babies include decreased breathing, fever, and low blood pressure. When injected into the penis for erectile dysfunction; side effects may include penile pain, bleeding at the site of injection, and prolonged erection (priapism). Prostaglandin E_{1} was isolated in 1957 and approved for medical use in the United States in 1981.

Misoprostol has various obstetric uses. It is used to induce abortion, to completely empty the uterus after a miscarriage, to induce labor, and to prevent and treat postpartum hemorrhage. The medication is available through many routes. It can be swallowed, dissolved in the mouth, placed in the vagina, or placed in the rectum. Misoprostol can also be used to manage duodenal ulcers and peptic ulcer disease when other medications are not effective. It is on the World Health Organization's List of Essential Medicines for its obstetric uses.

Lubiprostone is a PGE_{1} derivative used to treat chronic constipation. It is taken orally. Common side effects include diarrhea, vomiting, and abdominal pain.

== Biosynthesis ==
Prostaglandin E_{1} is biosynthesized on an as-needed basis from dihomo-γ-linolenic acid (an omega-6 fatty acid) in healthy humans without coronary artery disease and/or a genetic disorder.

== Medical uses ==
=== Alprostadil ===
Alprostadil is used for two main purposes: the treatment of newborns with congenital heart defects and in treatment of erectile dysfunction.

Some babies are born with heart defects which compromise blood flow to the body. In some defects, including tetralogy of Fallot, aortic valvular atresia, and Eisenmenger pulmonary hypertension, alprostadil is given intravenously by a nurse until surgery can be performed to repair the defect. The medication maintains a patent ductus arteriosus. The ductus arteriosus is a shortcut between the aorta and pulmonary artery, two large vessels branching off the heart. This shortcut allows the fetus to maintain blood flow before birth. However, it closes shortly after birth when the newborn can breathe oxygen. In babies with certain congenital defects, however, it's essential to keep the ductus arteriosus open to ensure at least some blood flow throughout the body. Side effects include decreased breathing or a lack of breathing at high doses. The medication can also cause hypotension, or low blood pressure.

Alprostadil is also used for adults with erectile dysfunction. It is typically given when other medications are ineffective. The medication relaxes smooth muscle and allows the arteries in the corpus cavernosum of the penis to dilate. Blood then flows to the penis. This blood flow compresses the veins which drain blood from the penis, trapping the blood in the corpus cavernosum. This process leads to erection. When injected into the base of the penis, alprostadil may cause penile pain, dizziness, headache, high blood pressure, Peyronie disease, and burning at the injection site. When inserted into the urethra, alprostadil may cause urethral burning, penile pain, dizziness, headache, and urethral bleeding. When someone engages in vaginal sex after using an alprostadil urethral suppository, their partner may experience vaginal itching.

Clinical trials for the treatment showed positive results in around 3,000 men that it was tested on; it is said to be usable by men with diabetes or heart problems and those who have undergone a prostatectomy.

=== Misoprostol ===
Misoprostol has a variety of uses in obstetrics and gynecology. It is also used to relieve pain from duodenal ulcers when other treatments have been ineffective.

Misoprostol can be used to induce labor in patients at the end of pregnancy. It causes cervical ripening, or the thinning and shortening of the cervix in preparation for birth. It also causes uterine contractions, allowing the body to expel the baby. For this purpose, it is placed inside the vagina.

Misoprostol is also used to prevent and treat postpartum hemorrhage (PPH), or uncontrolled bleeding following childbirth. The World Health Organization estimates that PPH causes 70,000 maternal deaths each year. Misoprostol induces uterine contractions, encouraging the uterus to shrink after childbirth. This shrinking puts pressure on blood vessels on the uterus, forcing them to close rather than continue to bleed. To prevent PPH, misoprostol is given orally or dissolved under the tongue immediately after delivery. To treat PPH, it is given orally, dissolved under the tongue, or placed in the rectum.

For the management of miscarriage in the first trimester of pregnancy, misoprostol is used to completely empty the uterus. This is important because the patient may develop an infection if they retain the products of conception. Misoprostol causes uterine contractions, forcing the body to expel the pregnancy. It can be used alone, but it is more effective in conjunction with mifepristone. Misoprostol is swallowed, placed inside the vagina, or dissolved in the mouth for this purpose.

Misoprostol can also be used to induce termination of pregnancy. It can be used on its own or following administration of mifepristone. Misoprostol may be used to terminate a pregnancy; typically only in the first trimester. Later abortions are less common and are usually performed surgically, at least in the United States. For first-trimester abortion, it is dissolved in the cheek or under the tongue; for later abortions, it can also be given as a vaginal suppository. Misoprostol may also be used to ripen the cervix in preparation for surgical abortion.

Misoprostol is given orally for the treatment of ulcers. It interacts with prostaglandin receptors in the stomach to reduce secretion of stomach acids. It increases the production of gastric mucus, which forms a protective coating against stomach acid. Finally, misoprostol encourages the production of bicarbonate, which is a base that counteracts stomach acid. The medication can also protect against stomach ulcers in people who take NSAIDs such as ibuprofen on a daily basis.

Misoprostol can cause nausea, stomach pain, and stomach cramps. In rare cases, it may lead to uterine rupture, which requires immediate emergency surgery.

=== Other uses ===
Prostanoids, including alprostadil, do not reduce the risk of limb amputation but may offer a slight improvement in rest-pain and leg ulcer healing in persons with critical limb ischemia.

Preventative administration of alprostadil may reduce the risk of kidney injury (specifically contrast-induced nephropathy) in persons having cardiac angiography or percutaneous coronary intervention.

Lubiprostone is a PGE_{1} derivative used to treat chronic constipation. It is taken orally. Common side effects include diarrhea, vomiting, and abdominal pain.
