= Intracavernous injection =

Injection into the base of the penis

- Other names: Intracavernosal injection
- Specialty: Urology

An intracavernous (or intracavernosal) injection is an injection into the base of the penis. This injection site is often used to administer medications to check for or treat erectile dysfunction in adult men (in, for example, a combined intracavernous injection and stimulation test). The more common medications administered in this manner include Caverject, Trimix (prostaglandin, papaverine, and phentolamine), Bimix (papaverine and phentolamine), and Quadmix (prostaglandin, papaverine, phentolamine, and either atropine or forskolin). These medications are all types of vasodilators and cause tumescence within 15 minutes. Common side effects include priapism, bruising, fibrosis, Peyronie's disease, and pain.

Priapism is also often treated with intracavernous injections, usually with sympathomimetic vasoconstricting drugs like adrenaline or phenylephrine.
