= Genital hiatus =

Distance between the urethral meatus and the posterior hymen

The genital hiatus is an anthopometric measure of the vulva defined as the distance between the urethral meatus and the posterior margin of the hymen.

The measure is part of the pelvic organ prolapse quantification system (POPQ). High genital hiatus distance is correlated with greater likelihood of pelvic organ prolapse.
