= Penile injury =

Medical emergency that afflicts the penis

A penile injury is a medical emergency that afflicts the penis. Common injuries include fracture, avulsion injury, strangulation, entrapment, and amputation.

== Epidemiology ==
Penetrating and blunt traumas combined make up approximately 90% of all civilian penile injuries (45% each), with burns and other accidents making up the remaining 10%.

== Types ==
=== Fracture ===
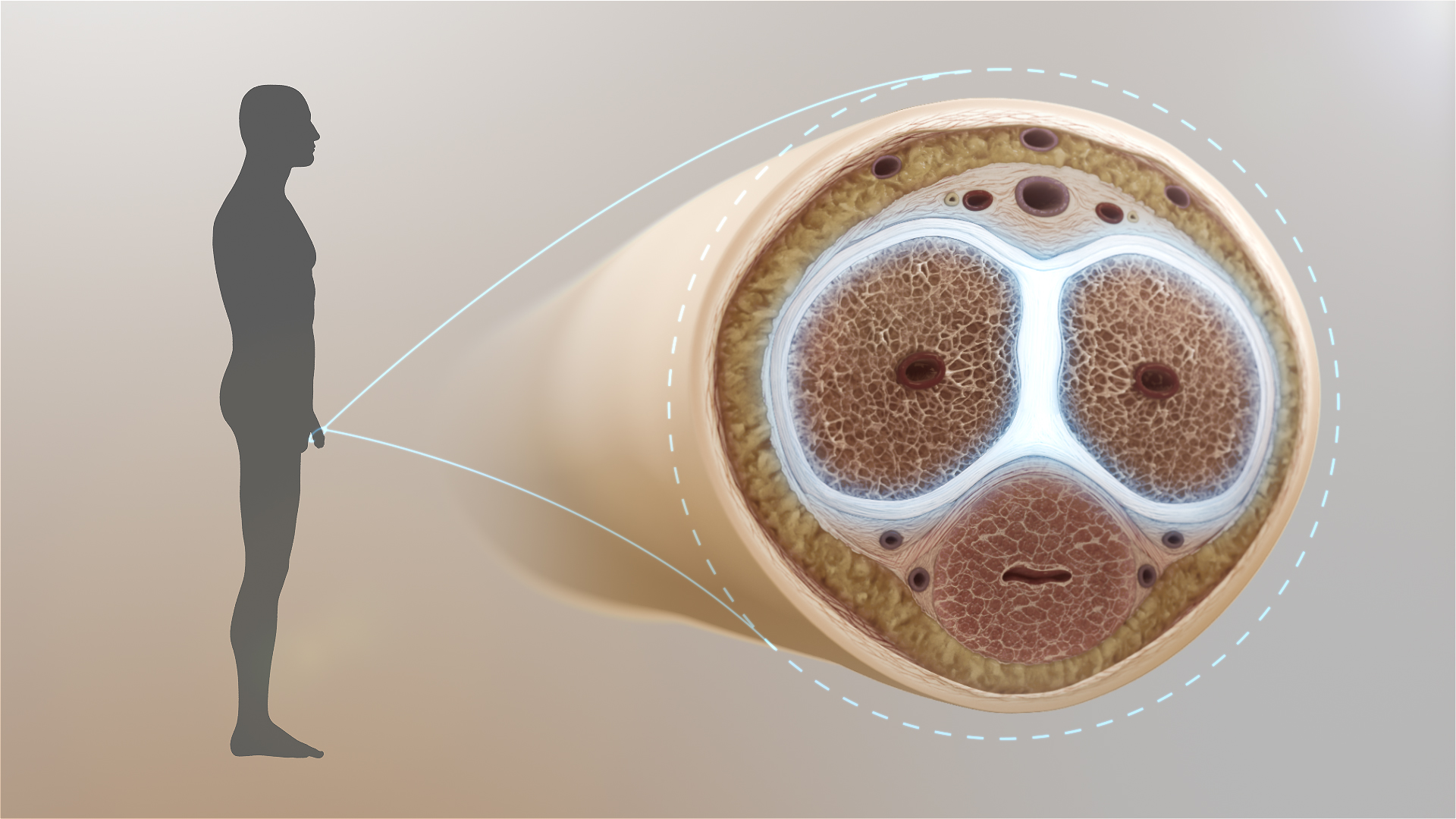
A still from a 3D medical animation showing tunica albuginea.

Penile fractures are the result of rupture of the tunica albuginea. They are fairly rare and can co-occur with partial or complete urethral rupture, though this is rare. Urethral damage occurs in 10–38% of cases. Fractures are treated with emergency surgery, and can be diagnosed with ultrasound, especially in pediatric cases. Penile fractures are caused by trauma to the erect penis, typically by suddenly bending it laterally during penetrative intercourse with the receptive partner on top of the penetrating partner, or during masturbation. Characterized by a loud popping sound at the time of the injury, the result of the tunica albuginea rupturing. Other symptoms include severe pain, loss of erection, and swelling. Symptoms of urethral injury include hematuria, blood at the meatus, and dysuria. If left untreated, complications result in 28–53% of cases; these include permanent curvature of the penis, fistula, urethral diverticulum, priapism, and erectile dysfunction.

=== Degloving and avulsion ===
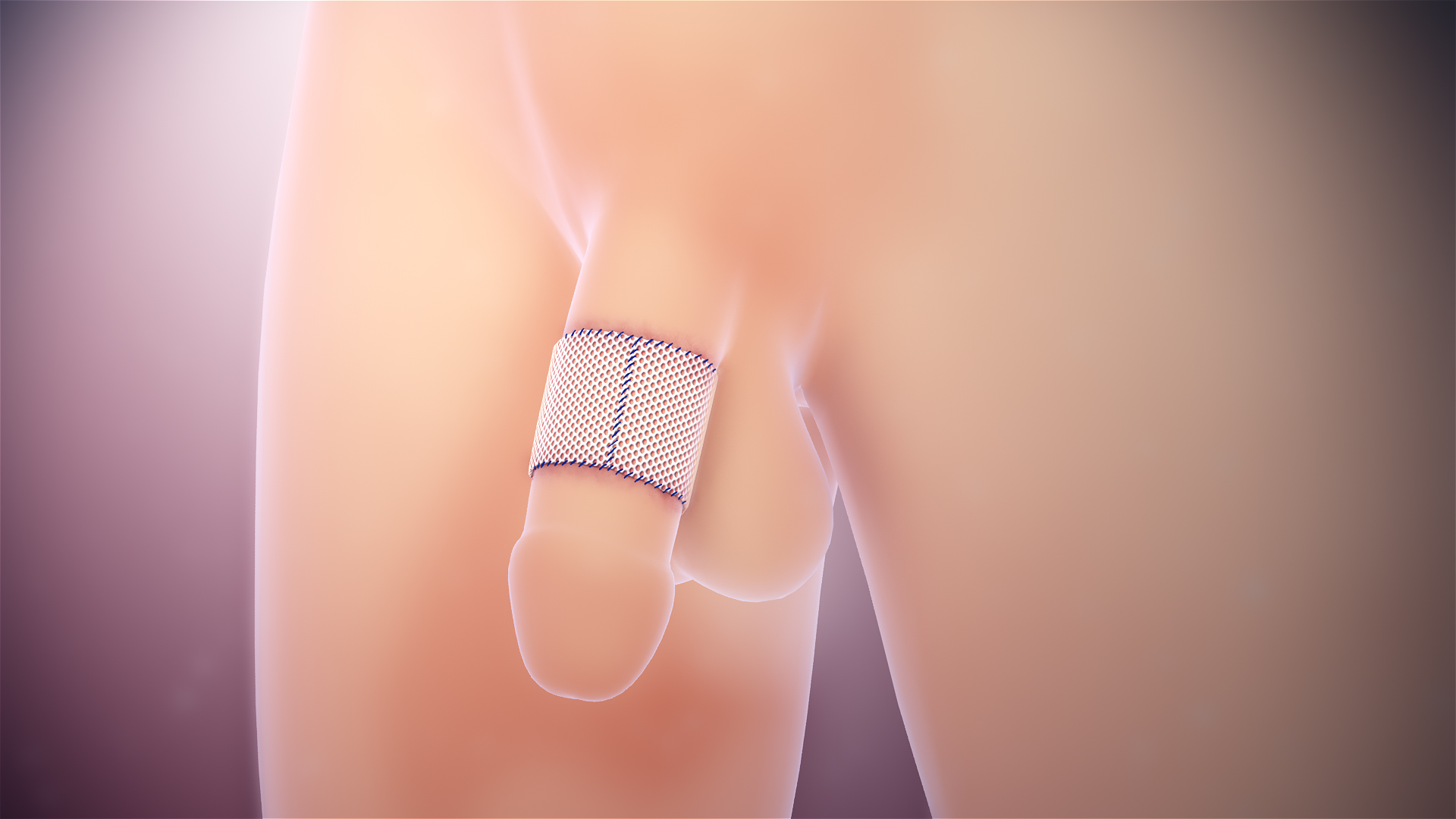
3D medical animation still showing skin grafting in case of penile injury.

Degloving and avulsion injuries involve the removal of the penis skin, which is a serious medical emergency. Treatment of these injuries involves either closure of the torn skin, or a skin graft to replace the skin lost in the injury. Skin grafts are constructed to attempt to preserve erectile function and sensation.

=== Soft-tissue injuries ===
==== Strangulation ====
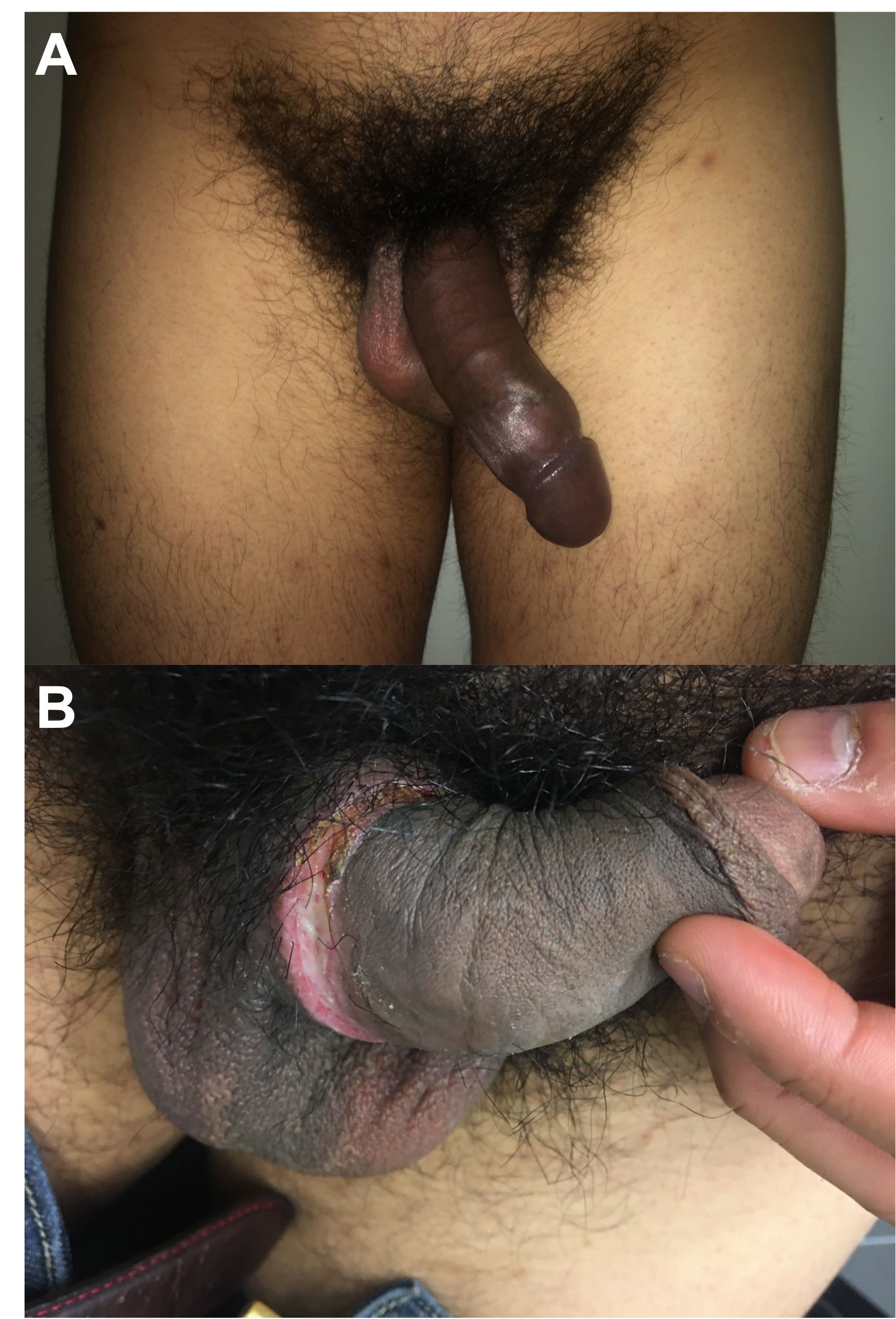
(A) A case of penile strangulation by a cable tie at the root of the penis. Both veins and arteries were compressed. (B) Penile ulcer at the root of the penis one week after the removal of the encircled object. The strangulation caused the permanent loss of sensation of the penis.

Strangulation injuries to the penis, also called incarceration injuries, are caused by hair, rubber bands, or other objects. Hair strangulation may be hard to diagnose due to the anatomy of the penis; the hair causing the strangulation may be hidden under the coronal sulcus if it is swollen. In adults, strangulation injuries that require medical treatment can be caused by a variety of objects typically used for the purpose of sexual gratification, extending the time of an erection, or enuresis, including metal rings, which must be removed by specialized cutting instruments. The object can also be removed by decompressing the penis. Because the vasculature of the penis is compressed, a variety of complications can result from strangulation injuries, depending on whether the veins, arteries, or both are compressed, including mild, reversible vascular obstruction; ischemic necrosis; gangrene and kidney damage; lymphedema; ulceration; urethrocutaneous fistula, loss of sensation; urethral injury; sepsis; and autoamputation.

Penile strangulation injuries that require medical attention are rare: since their first description in 1755, there have been approximately 60–120 reported cases. Though usually acute, cases of chronic strangulation and acute cases lasting up to one month have been reported.

Various objects have been involved in cases of strangulation:

- Wedding ring
- Steel ring
- Bottle
- Chastity belt

==== Entrapment ====
The most common soft-tissue injury is an entrapment injury involving the skin of the penis caught in a zipper; these injuries are particularly common in young children who are uncircumcised and are always superficial. They are treated by removing the zipper with local anesthesia using a bone cutter, lubrication, or hacksaw, dismantling the zipper, or removing the affected tissue, and can be prevented in most situations by circumcision, since the foreskin is the most commonly affected tissue. If not treated promptly, the affected tissue can swell and become infected. In some cases, emergency circumcision is necessary.

==== Other ====
Other soft-tissue injuries to the penis can be caused by burns, animal bites, and human bites. Animal bites are common in children, and dogs are the most common animals involved. Though typically not severe, animal bites can cause amputation or infection. Treatment for animal bites and human bites involves antibiotic treatment and closure of the wounds by secondary intention because they are contaminated.

Penis burns can be very severe and often require specialized care in a burn unit to prevent contractures, severe scarring, or other complications including lymphedema, hypospadias, or necrosis. This treatment can involve debridement, skin grafts, antibiotics, and the use of a suprapubic catheter. Because of its thin skin, the penis is susceptible to full-thickness, third-degree burns. Burns to the penis typically co-occur with other severe burns. Most thermal penis burns are first or second degree burns caused by flame; some are caused by grease or boiling water. Electrical burns are typically deeper than thermal burns and require more extensive tissue removal.

=== Amputation ===
Amputation of the penis can be either partial or complete. Often self-inflicted by people with psychiatric disorders, it may occur with other trauma, such as in an assault or a mechanical accident. These injuries are treated by re-implantation if possible, with or without anastomosis of the vasculature to restore erectile function; skin necrosis and loss of sensation are common complications after treatment. Microsurgery on the vasculature decreases the risk of necrosis significantly. Klingsor syndrome is a psychiatric disorder that causes self-harm, which can involve the penis. Paranoid schizophrenia, eating disorders, and psychotic breaks can also be associated with penile injury. In some cases, transgender people who are not able to access genital surgery may self-amputate their penis. Favorable prognostic factors for replantation of amputated penises include short ischemic time and a clean incision (as opposed to a crush injury or ragged incision).

Replantation of an amputated penis can be done up to 24 hours after the injury, though fewer than 16 hours of cold ischemia or 6 hours of warm ischemia leads to the best outcomes. If replantation is not possible or desired, a penile stump can be closed and phalloplasty could be performed later.

=== Penetration ===
Penetrating injuries can be caused by accidents during sexual activities (typically, by foreign objects inserted into the urethra), by weapons (e.g. bullets) during wartime, or by stabbing. These injuries can have varying severity and be superficial, affect the corpora cavernosa, other soft tissue, and/or urethra. In 50% of cases, the urethra is injured. Some foreign objects may be removed like any other penetrating object in soft tissue; using forceps and gentle traction. However, if the foreign object was inserted into the urethra or has damaged the urethra transversely, urethography is used to avoid further injury to the urinary tract while removing the object. Penetrating injuries make up approximately 45% of civilian penile injuries.

== Classification ==
Organ Injury Scale
Grade	Description of injury
I	Superficial injury to the skin (laceration or contusion)
II	Injury to the cavernosa/Buck's fascia, no tissue loss
III	Avulsion or laceration through the urethral meatus, glans, or cavernosa, or urethral damage less than 2 cm in size
IV	Partial penectomy (amputation) or a cavernosal/urethral injury more than 2 cm in size
V	Complete penectomy (amputation or replacement)

== Causes ==
The causes of penile injury are mostly the same as other causes of trauma; however, penile injury is more likely to occur during sexual intercourse and masturbation than other traumas. Nocturnal erections and sleeping positions can be another cause of penile injury. Industrial and automobile accidents can also cause penile injury. Self-injury may also affect the penis.

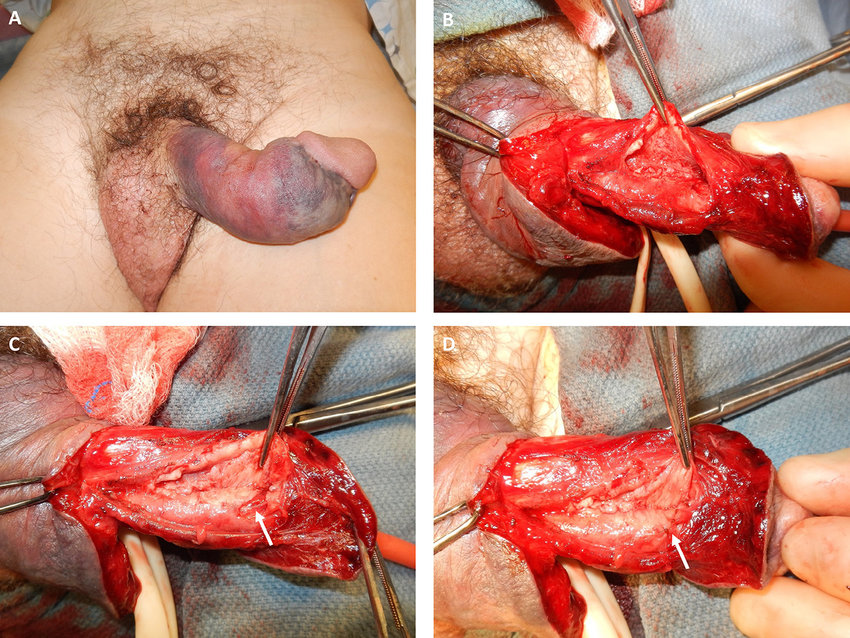
Abnormally curved, bruised penis. Eggplant sign.

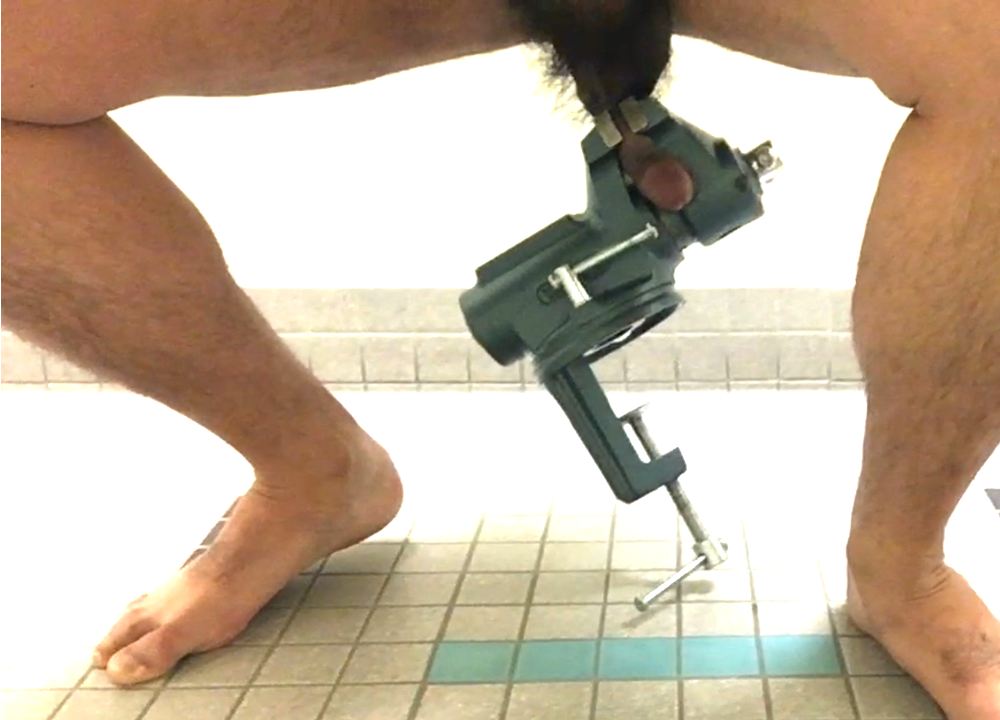
Penile injury by self-mutilation involves injury to the glans penis by a needle puncture (left) or to the root of the penis by hanging a heavy-duty combination vise that clamped the penis (right). The type of injury from these self-harming behaviors varies from skin laceration to total amputation of the penis.

== Diagnosis ==
Most penile trauma can be diagnosed by history and physical examination, hearing 'snapping' or 'popping' sound, immediate penile pain, swollen, bruised (often known as eggplant deformity), some may notice blood over the urethral meatus. But in some cases, ultrasonography can indicate the extent of the injury and help a clinician decide if the injured person needs surgical treatment. It is important to rule out urethral injury in those with penile injury, as it is a urological emergency that may result in significant morbidity if left untreated.

== Treatment ==
The type of injury dictates the treatment; however, surgery is a common treatment. Most traumatic penile injury warrant an emergency repairing surgery to prevent complications and maintain functionality of the penis sexually and urologically.

Catheterization is usually a part of treatment for penis injuries; when the urethra is intact, urethral catheterization may be used, but if it has been injured, suprapubic catheterization is used. Some injuries, including animal bites, are also treated with antibiotics, irrigation, and rabies prophylaxis.

== Complications ==
Common complications from penile injury are erectile dysfunction, abnormal penile curvature, penile abscess, formation of fibrotic plaques, painful erection, urethral stricture, uretherocutaneous or corporourethral fistula.
