= Cock and ball torture =

Form of sexual play

Cock and ball torture (CBT) is a sexual activity involving the consensual application of pain, pressure, or constriction to the male genitals. Practices can include squeezing, genital spanking, genital piercing, wax play, urethral play, erotic electrostimulation, and impact play such as ballbusting. The testicles are particularly sensitive to pain, and even relatively minor impact can cause pain or discomfort.

The recipient of such activities may receive pleasure via masochism, emotional pleasure through erotic humiliation, or knowledge that the play is pleasing to a sadistic dominant.

== Devices and practices ==
CBT can be performed using toys and devices.

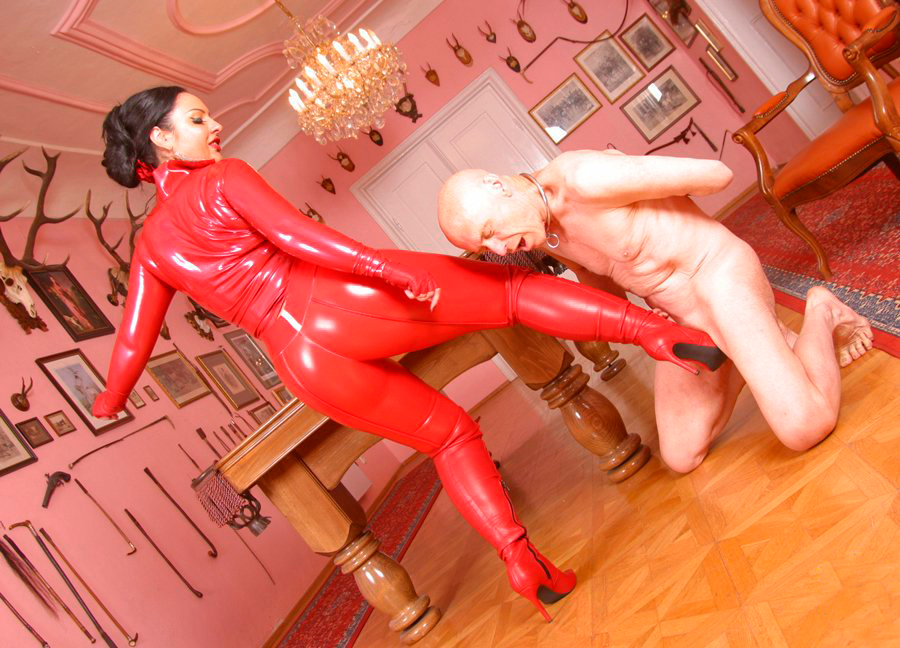
A dominatrix performing ballbusting by kicking a man's testicles.

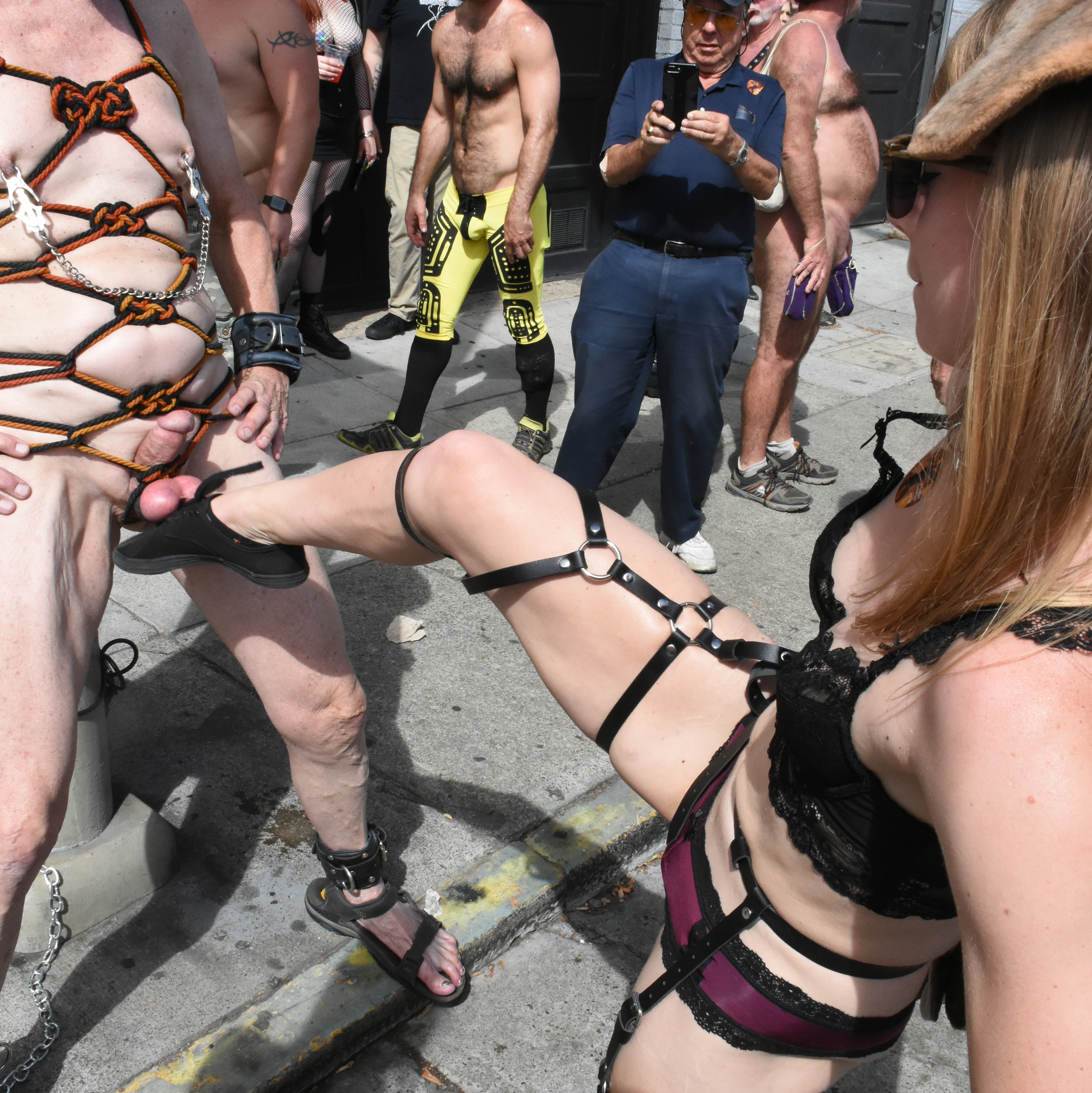
Ballbusting at the Folsom Street Fair in 2018.

=== Ballbusting ===
Ballbusting is a practice in which pain is deliberately applied to the testicles, through impact such as kicking, kneeing or pressure. Pain from testicular impact results from activation of pain-sensitive nerve endings. Because sensory pathways from the testicles overlap with pathways in the abdomen, it can produce characteristic sensation of being “hit in the stomach”.

It is particularly associated with female domination, in which a dominant woman applies the sensation to a male submissive. It is described as a practice that can challenge conventional associations with masculine strength.

Participants may be drawn to the practice for different reasons, as research on people identifying with dominant roles has found that motivations include the sense of control or self-expression.

=== Ball stretcher ===
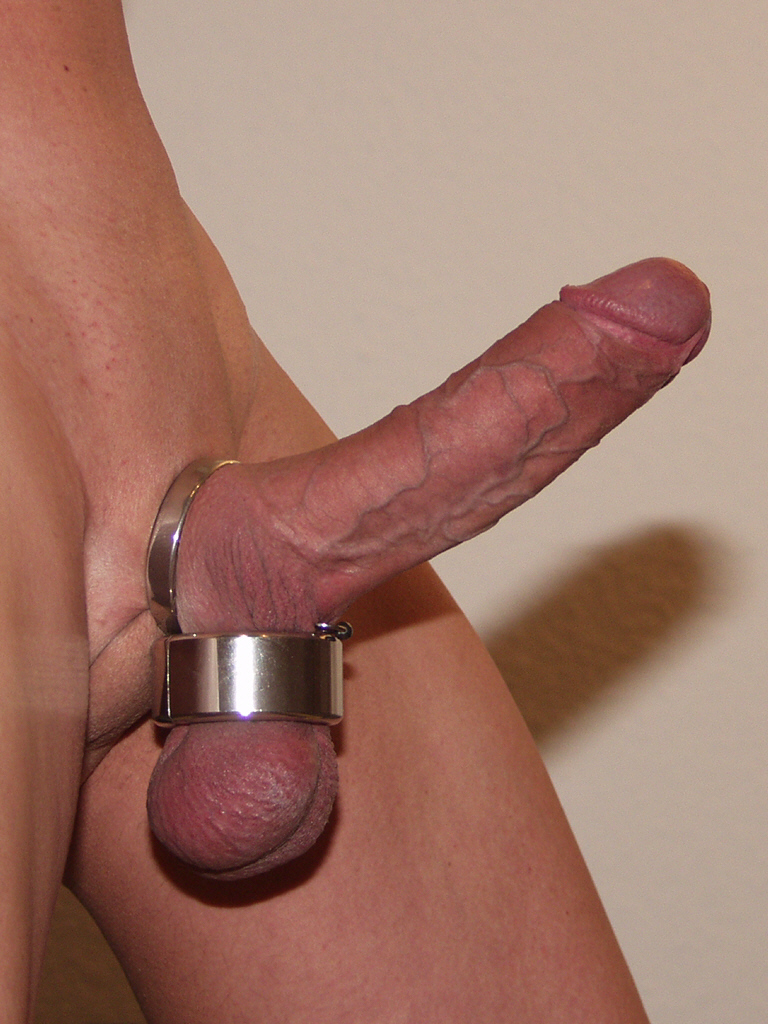
A metal ball stretcher and cock ring, which forces penis' erection

A ball stretcher is a sex toy that is used to elongate the scrotum and provide a feeling of weight pulling the testicles away from the body. Intended to make one's testicles hang lower than normal, this sex toy can be potentially harmful to the genitals as the circulation of blood can be cut off if over-tightened.

Most ball stretchers are leather, rubber, or stainless steel. Leather ones usually are fastened with snaps, wrapping around the scrotum with the testicles hanging below. Rubber ones stretch enough for the testicles to pass through, and can be either a tube or a ring, where multiple rings can be added to create the desired length of "stretch". The length of a stretcher can range from 2 to 10 cm (1 to 4 in).

=== Ball crusher ===
A ball crusher is a device that applies adjustable pressure to the testicles, typically using screws to draw together plates or other clamping surfaces.

=== Parachute ===
A parachute is a small collar, usually made from leather, which fastens around the scrotum, and from which weights can be hung. It is conical in shape, with three or four short chains hanging beneath, to which weights can be attached.

=== Humbler ===
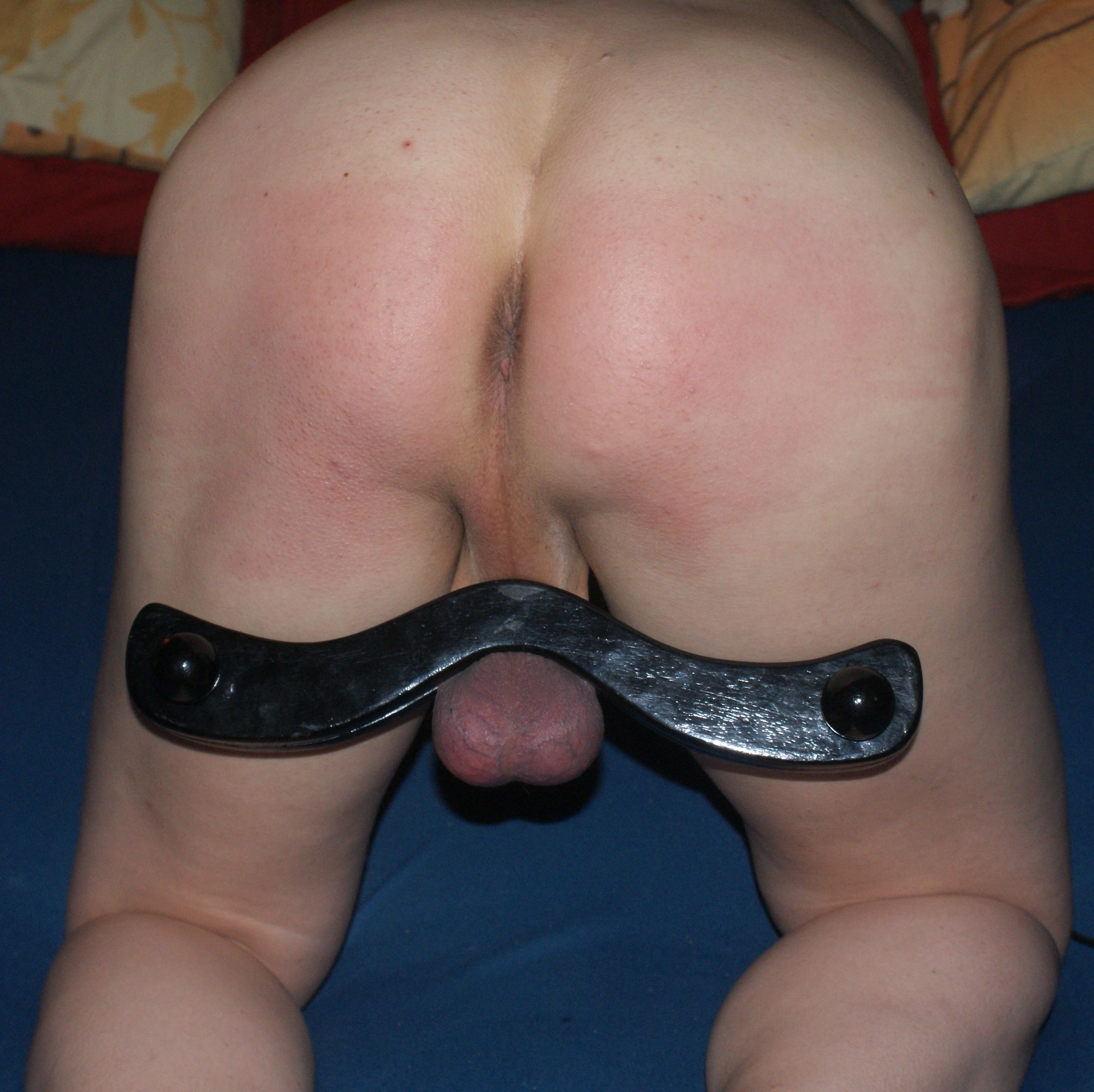
Kneeling man wearing a humbler

A humbler is a BDSM physical restraint device, a cock-and-ball bondage toy used to restrict the movement of a submissive participant in a BDSM scene. It consists of a testicle cuff device, typically a ring, that clamps around the base of the scrotum while it is drawn back between the legs. This is mounted in the center of a bar or pair of rods that pass behind the thighs at the base of the buttocks. As a result, the wearer is forced to keep their legs folded forward, preventing the user from standing up straight, having to stay bent over or crawl on all fours.

=== Testicle cuffs ===
A testicle cuff is a ring-shaped device that can be placed around the scrotum between the body and the testicles. When it is closed it prevents the testicles from passing through. A common type of testicle cuff consists of two connected cuffs, one around the scrotum and the other around the base of the penis. A standard padlock may also be locked around the scrotum.

Some passive participants enjoy the feeling of being "owned", while dominant individuals enjoy the sense of "owning" their partners. Requiring such an individual wear testicle cuffs symbolizes that their sexual organs belong to their partner. The cuffs may also form part of a sexual fetish of the wearer or their partner.

=== Cock harness ===
Early cock harnesses were used to prevent erections in a variety of ways; many of them caused pain in the penis, typically using sharp projections from cock rings or sometimes via electric shocks. These devices were designed for medical use, to prevent ejaculation while sleeping which was believed to cause "seminal weakness" and other physical problems. An example was the jugum penis.

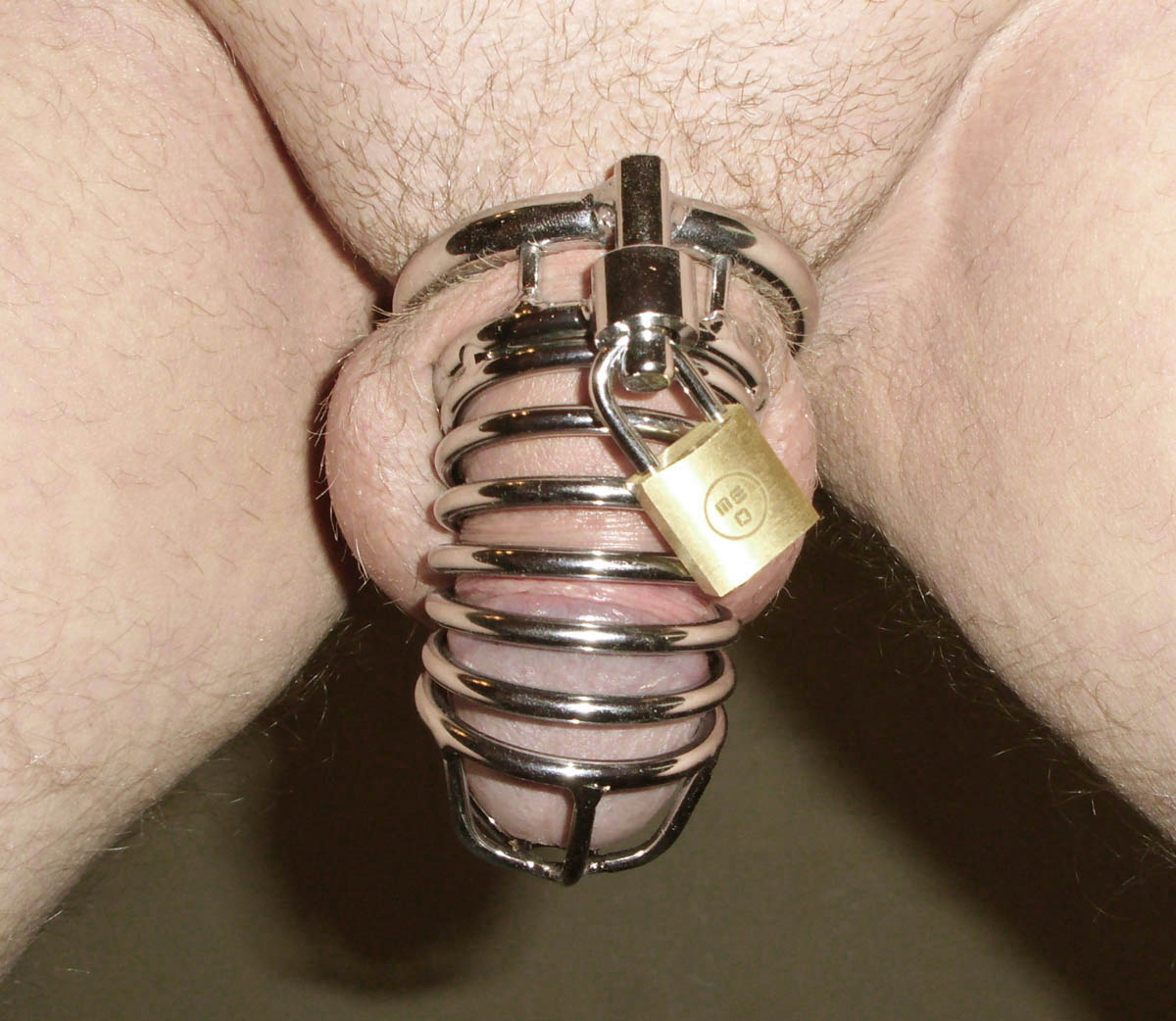
A "Gates of Hell" chastity device used for erotic sexual denial. It prevents the penis of a submissive male who has been sexually aroused from becoming erect.

A Kali's Teeth bracelet, designed to be fastened around the penis and cause pain if it becomes erect

== In Japan ==
Tamakeri (玉蹴り) (lit. ball kicking) is a sexual fetish and subgenre of BDSM within which a man's testicles are abused. The genre is also referred to as ballbusting ("bb" for short).

Denkianma (電気按摩) (lit. "electric massage") is a popular Japanese prank played between two people where one person puts their foot into the genital area of the other and shakes it in a vibrating motion. Often this is done by grabbing the other person's feet, raising them, and then placing one's own foot on their crotch and vibrating it. This is often done between school aged boys as a prank similar to kanchō or as a type of bullying. In 2006, Frito Lay released a special, Taitsukun-themed edition of Doritos chips, that referenced denki anma.

== Safety ==
Loss of blood flow is one of the greatest risks in cock and ball torture and may cause irreversible damage. Bleeding is an indicator of unsafe behavior. Because numbness may result from circulation problems in the affected member, the level of pain is not an indicator of a problem and signs of danger include numbness or loss of color and edemas. Bondage in which the testicles are tied to another object is especially dangerous, increasing the risk of damaging the testicles through excessive tension or pulling.

The most serious injuries are testicular rupture, testicular torsion and testicular avulsion, which are medical emergencies that require urgent medical attention.

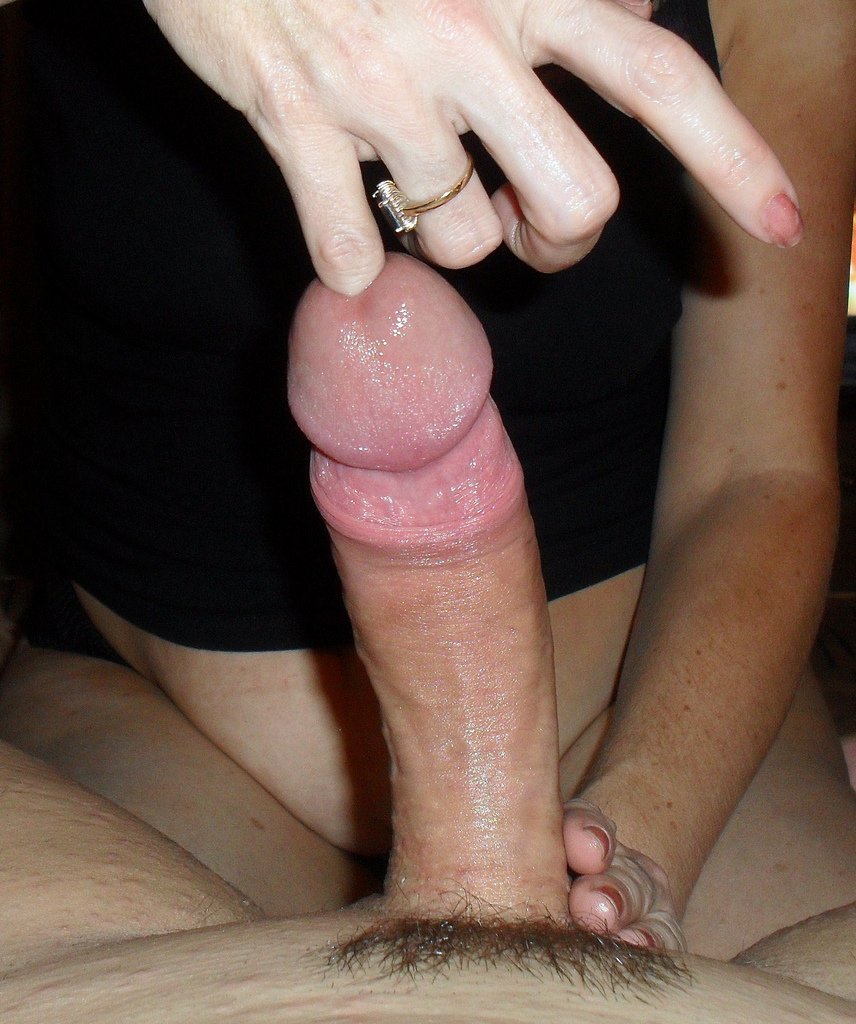
Urethral fingering is an example of CBT needing special precautions, such as not having a sharp nail on the finger inserted inside the penis. Image shows a woman doing urethral fingering.

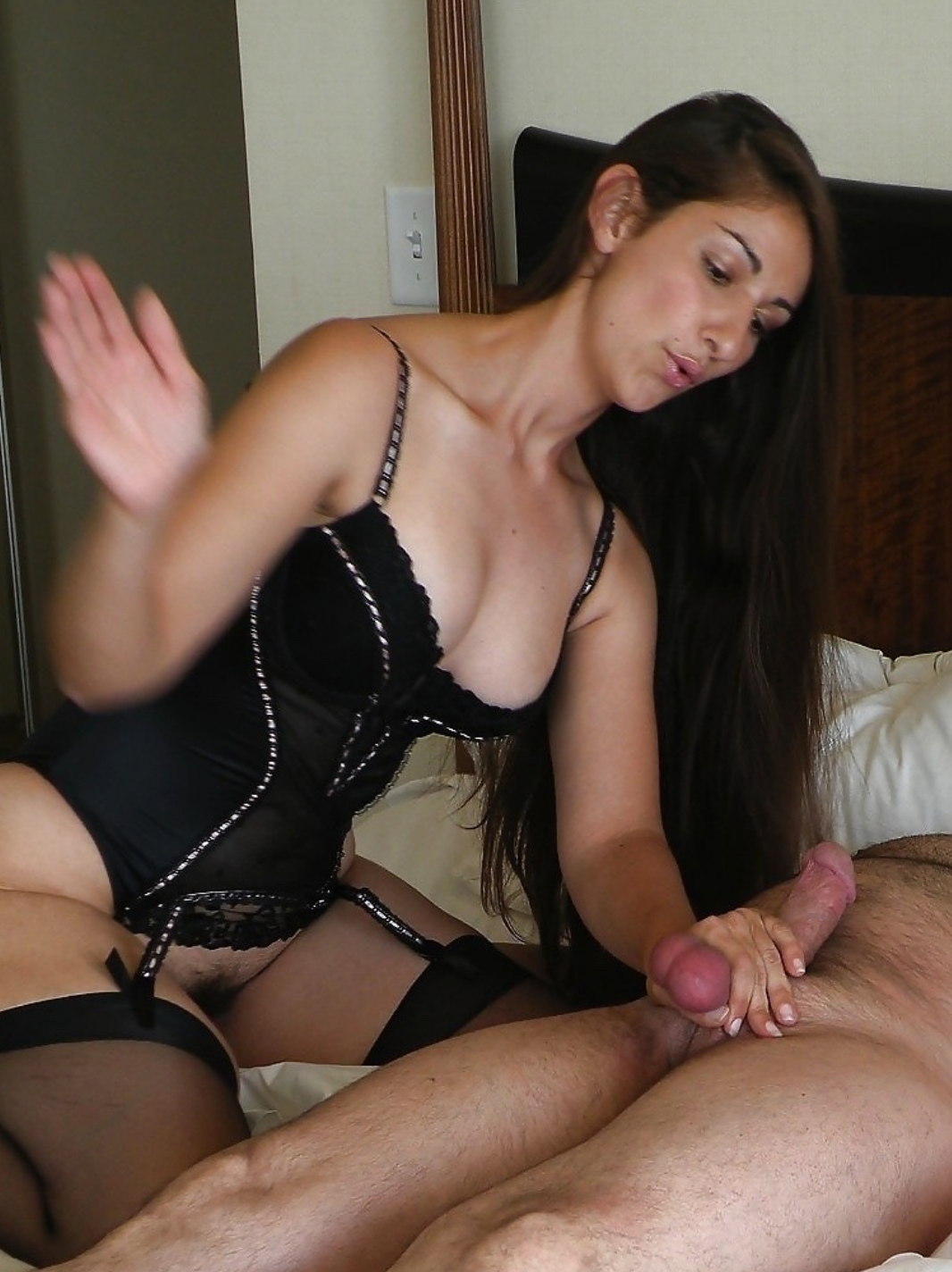
A woman manually striking a man's testicles during ballbusting.

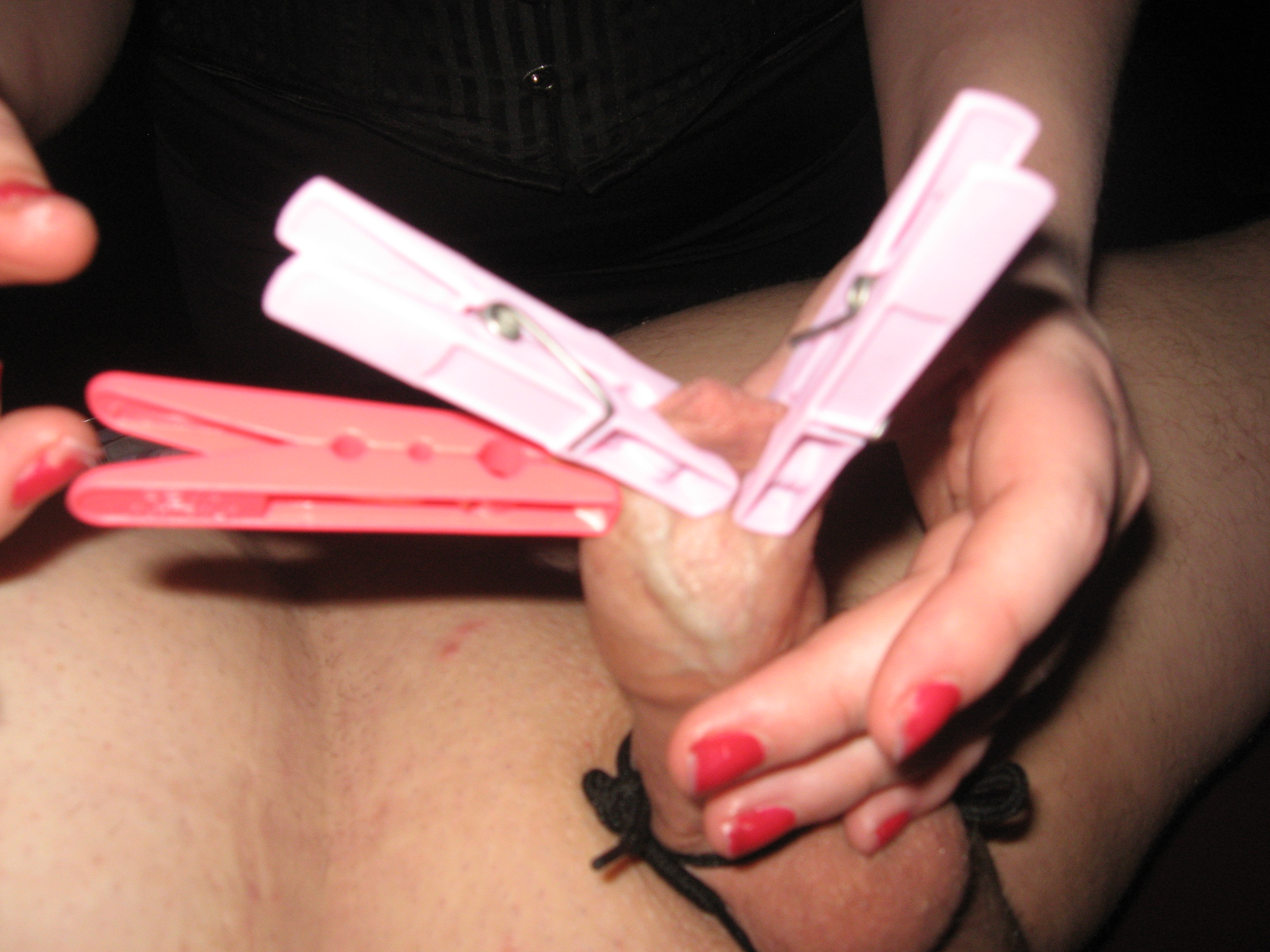
A woman puts clamps (in this case plastic clothespins) on a man's penis. The clamps should not be pulled off forcefully.

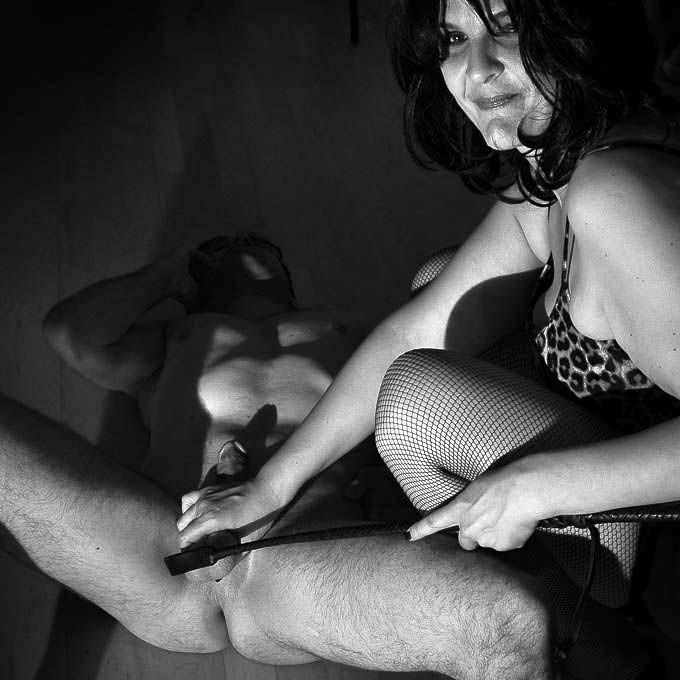
A woman striking a man's testicles with a paddle during ballbusting.

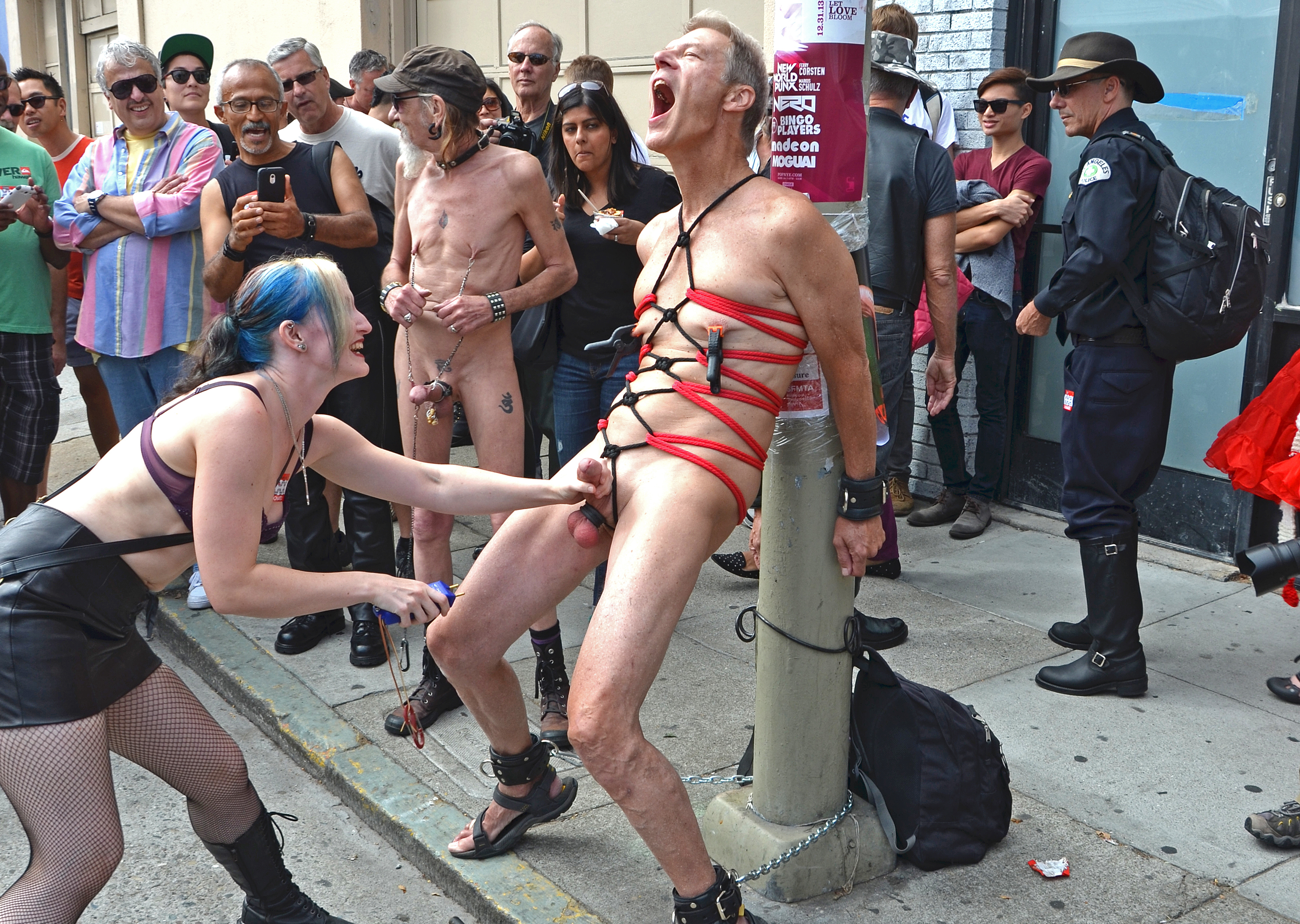
A woman holding a bound man's penis applies electricity to his testicles at Folsom Street Fair. The electricity applied should never be increased suddenly.

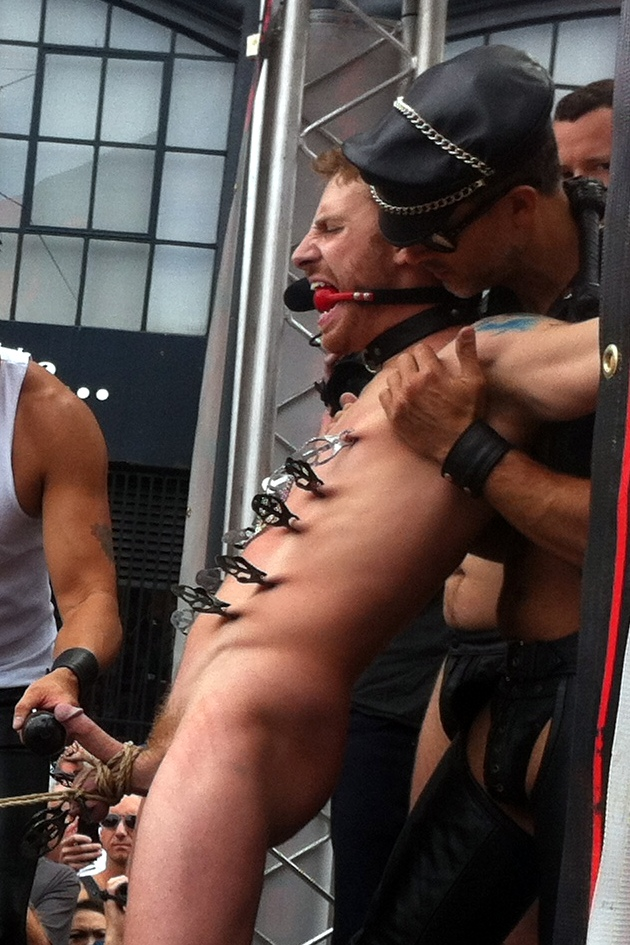
A gagged man's penis and scrotum are pulled using a rope at Folsom Street Fair. The force applied to pull should always be increased gradually.

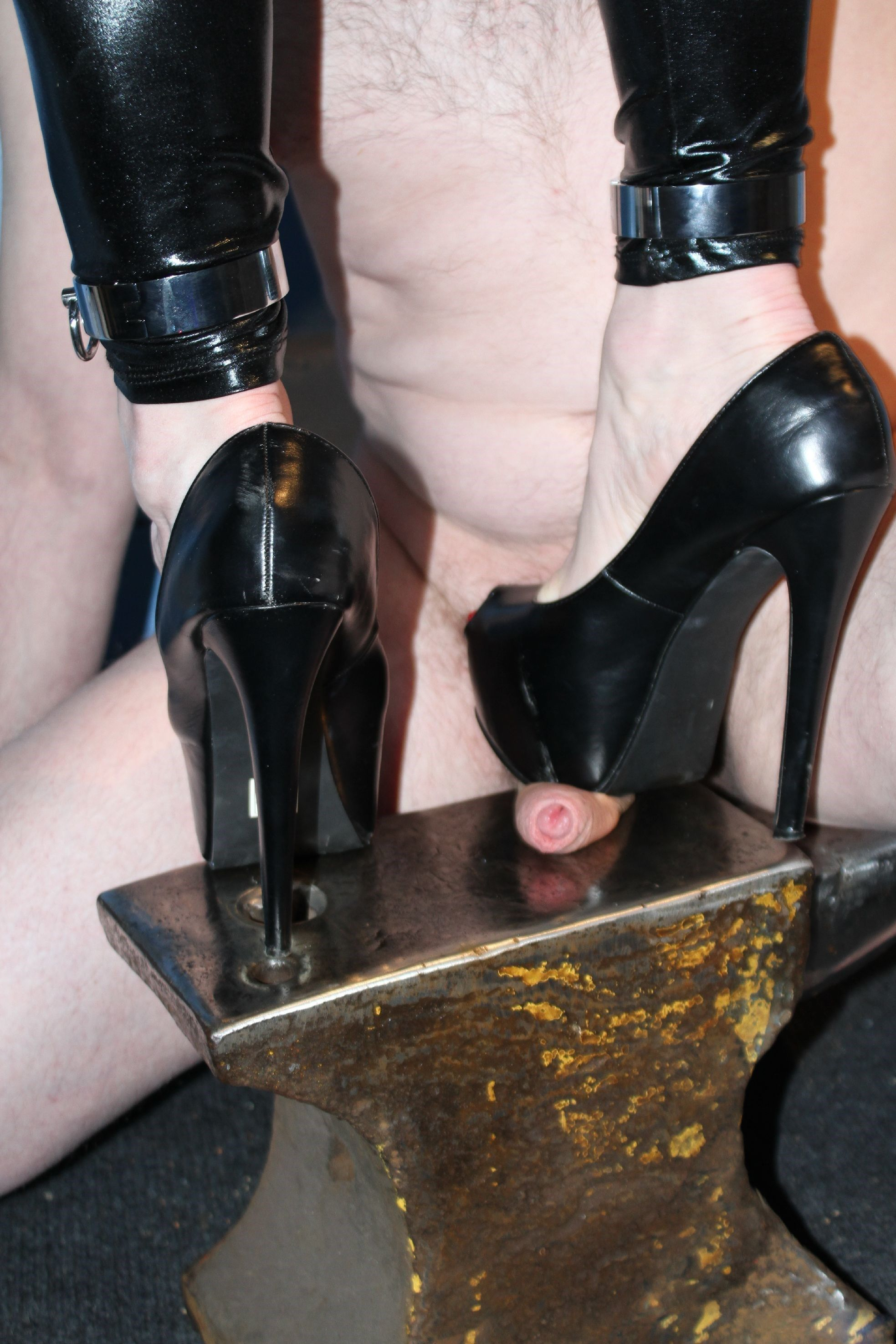
A dominant woman wearing heels tramples the penis of her submissive male on an anvil. This should be done very carefully to prevent serious injury.

== See also ==
- Breast torture
- Chastity cage
- Chastity piercing
- Forced orgasm
- Groin attack
- Penile injury
