= Priapism =

Medical condition where an erection lasts excessively long

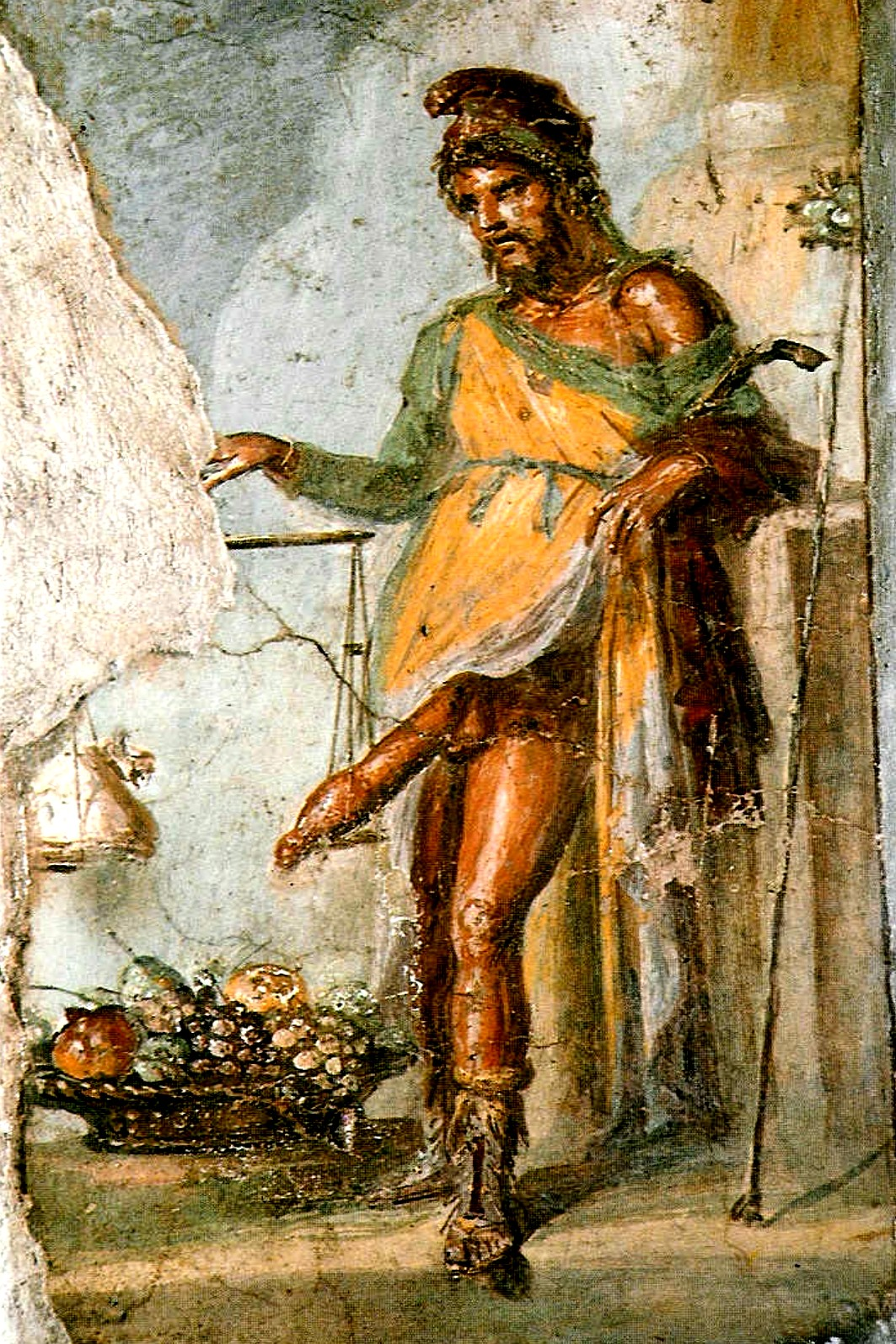
- Fresco in Pompeii depicting Priapus
- Pronunciation: /ˈpraɪ.əˌpɪzəm/
- Specialty: Urology, emergency medicine
- Symptoms: Penis remains erect for hours
- Complications: Permanent scarring of the penis
- Types: Ischemic (low-flow), nonischemic (high-flow), recurrent ischemic (intermittent)
- Causes: Sickle cell disease, antipsychotics, SSRIs, blood thinners, cocaine, trauma
- Treatment: Ischemic: Removal of blood from the corpus cavernosum with a needle Non-ischemic: Cold packs and compression
- Frequency: 1 in 60,000 males per year

Priapism is a condition in which a penis remains erect for hours in the absence of stimulation or after stimulation has ended. There are three types: ischemic (low-flow), nonischemic (high-flow), and recurrent ischemic (intermittent). Most cases are ischemic. Ischemic priapism is generally painful while nonischemic priapism is not. In ischemic priapism, most of the penis is hard; however, the glans penis is not. In nonischemic priapism, the entire penis is only somewhat hard. Very rarely, clitoral priapism occurs in women.

Sickle cell disease is the most common cause of ischemic priapism. Other causes include medications such as antipsychotics, SSRIs, blood thinners and prostaglandin E1, as well as drugs such as cocaine. Ischemic priapism occurs when blood does not adequately drain from the penis. Nonischemic priapism is typically due to a connection forming between an artery and the corpus cavernosum or disruption of the parasympathetic nervous system resulting in increased arterial flow. Nonischemic priapism may occur following trauma to the penis or a spinal cord injury. Diagnosis may be supported by blood gas analysis of blood aspirated from the penis or an ultrasound.

Treatment depends on the type. Ischemic priapism is typically treated with a nerve block of the penis followed by aspiration of blood from the corpora cavernosa. If this is not sufficient, the corpus cavernosum may be irrigated with cold, normal saline or injected with phenylephrine. Nonischemic priapism is often treated with cold packs and compression. Surgery may be done if usual measures are not effective. In ischemic priapism, the risk of permanent scarring of the penis begins to increase after four hours and definitely occurs after 48 hours. Priapism occurs in about 1 in 20,000 to 1 in 100,000 males per year.

== Classification ==
Priapism is classified into three groups: ischemic (low-flow), nonischemic (high-flow), and recurrent ischemic. The majority of cases (19 out of 20) are ischemic in nature.

Some sources give a duration of four hours as a definition of priapism, but others give six. Per the University Hospital Schleswig Holstein, "The duration of a normal erection before it is classifiable as priapism is still controversial. Ongoing penile erections for more than 4 hours can be classified as priapism."

=== In women ===
Priapism in women (continued, painful erection of the clitoris) is significantly rarer than priapism in men and is known as clitoral priapism or clitorism. It is associated with persistent genital arousal disorder (PGAD). Only a few case reports of women experiencing clitoral priapism exist.

== Signs and symptoms ==
=== Complications ===
Because ischemic priapism causes the blood to remain in the penis for unusually long periods of time, the blood becomes deprived of oxygen, which can cause damage to the penile tissue. Such damage can result in erectile dysfunction or disfigurement of the penis. In extreme cases, if the penis develops severe vascular disease, the priapism can result in penile gangrene.

=== Low-flow priapism ===
Causes of low-flow priapism include sickle cell anemia (most common in children), leukemia, and other blood dyscrasias such as thalassemia and multiple myeloma, and the use of various drugs, as well as cancers. A genome-wide association study on Brazilian patients with sickle cell disease identified four single nucleotide polymorphisms in LINC02537 and NAALADL2 significantly associated with priapism.

Other conditions that can cause priapism include Fabry's disease, as well as neurologic disorders such as spinal cord lesions and spinal cord trauma (priapism has been reported in people who have been hanged; see death erection).

Priapism can also be caused by reactions to medications. The most common medications that cause priapism are intra-cavernous injections for the treatment of erectile dysfunction (papaverine, alprostadil). Other medication groups reported are antihypertensives (e.g. Doxazosin), antipsychotics (e.g., chlorpromazine, clozapine), antidepressants (most notably trazodone), anti-convulsant and mood stabilizer drugs such as sodium valproate. Anticoagulants, cantharides (Spanish Fly) and recreational drugs (alcohol, heroin and cocaine) have been associated. Priapism is also known to occur from bites of the Brazilian wandering spider.

=== High-flow priapism ===
Causes of high-flow priapism include:

- blunt trauma to the perineum or penis, with laceration of the cavernous artery, which can generate an arterial-lacunar fistula.
- Anticoagulants (heparin and warfarin).
- Antihypertensives (i.e., hydralazine, guanethidine and propranolol).
- Hormones (i.e., gonadotropin releasing hormone and testosterone).

== Diagnosis ==
The diagnosis is often based on the history of the condition as well as a physical exam.

Blood gas testing the blood from the cavernosa of the penis can help in the diagnosis. If the low-flow type of priapism is present, the blood typically has a low pH, while if the high-flow type is present, the pH is typically normal. Color Doppler ultrasound may also help differentiate the two. Testing a person to make sure they do not have a hemoglobinopathy may also be reasonable.

=== Ultrasonography ===
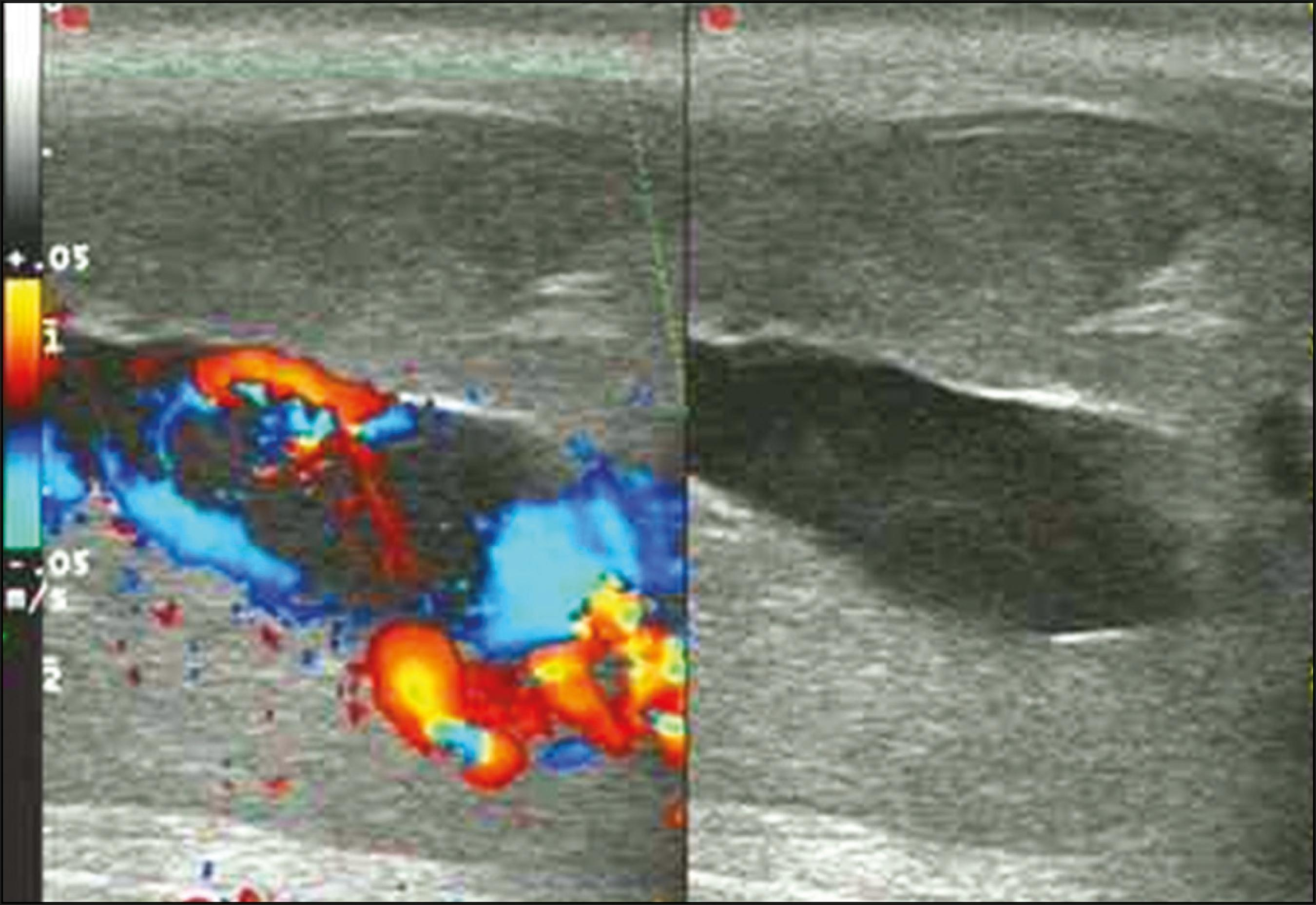
Color Doppler ultrasound demonstrating a hypoechoic collection that corresponds to hematoma with arteriovenous fistula secondary to traumatic injury of the penis due to impact with bicycle handlebars, resulting in high-flow priapism

Penile ultrasonography with Doppler is the imaging method of choice, because it is noninvasive, widely available, and highly sensitive. By means of this method, it is possible to diagnose priapism and differentiate between its low- and high-flow forms.

In low-flow (ischemic) priapism the flow in the cavernous arteries is reduced or absent. As the condition progresses, there is an increase in echogenicity of the corpora cavernosa, attributed to tissue edema. Eventually, changes in the echotexture of the corpora cavernosa can be observed due to the fibrotic transformation generated by tissue anoxia.

In high-flow priapism normal or increased, turbulent blood flow in the cavernous arteries is seen. The area surrounding the fistula presents a hypoechoic, irregular lesion in the cavernous tissue.

== Treatment ==
Medical evaluation is recommended for erections that last for longer than four hours. Pain can often be reduced with a dorsal penile nerve block or penile ring block. For those with nonischemic priapism, cold packs and pressure to the area may be sufficient.

=== Pseudoephedrine ===
Orally administered pseudoephedrine is a first-line treatment for priapism. Erection is largely a parasympathetic response, so the sympathetic action of pseudoephedrine may serve to relieve this condition. Pseudoephedrine is an alpha-agonist agent that exerts a constriction effect on smooth muscle of corpora cavernosum, which in turn facilitates venous outflow. Pseudoephedrine is no longer available in some countries.

=== Aspiration ===
For those with ischemic priapism, the initial treatment is typically aspiration of blood from the corpus cavernosum. This is done on either side. If this is not sufficiently effective, then cold normal saline may be injected and removed.

=== Medications ===
If aspiration is not sufficient, a small dose of phenylephrine may be injected into the corpus cavernosum. Side effects of phenylephrine may include: high blood pressure, slow heart rate, and arrhythmia. If this medication is used, it is recommended that people be monitored for at least an hour after. For those with recurrent ischemic priapism, diethylstilbestrol (DES) or terbutaline may be tried.

=== Surgery ===
Distal shunts, such as the Winter's, involve puncturing the glans (the distal part of the penis) into one of the cavernosa, where the old, stagnant blood is held. This causes the blood to leave the penis and return to the circulation. This procedure can be performed by a urologist at the bedside. Winter's shunts are often the first invasive technique used, especially in hematologically induced priapism, as it is relatively simple and repeatable.

Proximal shunts, such as the Quackel's, are more involved and entail operative dissection in the perineum where the corpora meet the spongiosum while making an incision in both and suturing both openings together. Shunts created between the corpora cavernosa and great saphenous vein called a Grayhack shunt can be done though this technique is rarely used.

As the complication rates with prolonged priapism are high, early penile prosthesis implantation may be considered. As well as allowing early resumption of sexual activity, early implantation can avoid the formation of dense fibrosis and, hence, a shortened penis.

=== Sickle cell anemia ===
In sickle cell anemia, treatment is initially with intravenous fluids, pain medication, and oxygen therapy. The typical treatment of priapism may be carried out as well. Blood transfusions are not usually recommended as part of the initial treatment, but if other treatments are not effective, exchange transfusion may be done.

==== Sickle cell disease ====
In people with sickle cell disease who present with acute ischemic priapism, the AUA/SMSNA guideline recommends that management focus first on urologic relief of the erection. Standard sickle cell assessment and treatment, such as intravenous fluids, pain medication and oxygen, should be considered at the same time, not before.[N1][19] The guideline advises that standard priapism treatment should not be delayed for disease-specific systemic interventions, and that exchange transfusion should not be used as the primary treatment.

== History ==
Persistent semi-erections and intermittent states of prolonged erections have historically been sometimes called semi-priapism.

=== Terminology ===
The name comes from the Greek god Priapus (Ancient Greek: Πρίαπος), a fertility god, often represented with a disproportionately large phallus.
