= Caspar Bartholin =

Caspar Bartholin (also Berthelsen or Bartholinus) may refer to:

- Caspar Bartholin the Elder (1585–1629), Danish theologian and medical professor
- Caspar Bartholin the Younger (1655–1738), Danish anatomist
