= Fossa navicularis =

Fossa navicularis is an alternate name for two different boat-shaped depressions:

- fossa of vestibule of vagina
- navicular fossa of male urethra
