= Thomas Bartholin =

Danish physician, mathematician and theologian (1616–1680)

- Karel van Mander III, Portrait of Thomas Bartholin, Amsterdam Museum
- Born: 20 October 1616; Malmø, Denmark-Norway
- Died: 4 December 1680 (aged 64); Copenhagen
- Education: University of Padua
- Known for: Lymphatic system
- Scientific career
- Fields: Medicine
- Workplaces: University of Copenhagen
- Academic advisors: Johannes Walaeus

Thomas Bartholin (/bɑːrˈtoʊlɪn, ˈbɑːrtəlɪn/; Latinized as Thomas Bartholinus; 20 October 1616 – 4 December 1680) was a Danish physician, mathematician, and theologian. He discovered the lymphatic system in humans and advanced the theory of refrigeration anesthesia, being the first to describe it scientifically.

Thomas Bartholin came from a family that has become famous for its pioneering scientists, twelve of whom became professors at the University of Copenhagen. Three generations of the Bartholin family made significant contributions to anatomical science and medicine in the 17th and 18th centuries: Thomas Bartholin's father, Caspar Bartholin the Elder (1585–1629), his brother Rasmus Bartholin (1625–1698), and his son Caspar Bartholin the Younger (1655–1738). Thomas Bartholin's son Thomas Bartholin the Younger (1659–1690) became a professor of history at the University of Copenhagen and was later appointed royal antiquarian and secretary to the Royal Archives.

== Personal life ==
Thomas Bartholin was the second of the six sons of Caspar Bartholin the Elder, a physician born in Malmø, Scania, and his spouse Anne Fincke. Bartholin the Elder published the first collected anatomical work in 1611. This work was later augmented, illustrated and revised by Thomas Bartholin, becoming the standard reference on anatomy; the son notably added updates on William Harvey's theory of blood circulation and on the lymphatic system.

When his father died in 1629, his uncle by marriage, the polymath Ole Worm, took charge of his education. In 1634, Bartholin enrolled at the University of Copenhagen, where he studied philology, philosophy, and theology. Three years later, with the support of the king and Worm, he embarked on a nine-year study tour of Europe. Bartholin attended the universities of Paris, Leiden, Basel, Montpellier and Padua, where he studied under the anatomist Johann Vesling. In Leiden, he decided to switch to the study of medicine. There, as a student of Johannes Walaeus, he focused primarily on the lymphatic vessels and William Harvey’s theory of blood circulation. Walaeus encouraged him to prepare a new, improved edition of the anatomy textbook originally authored by his father; this edition was published with the support of both Walaeus and Franciscus Sylvius and incorporated the work of Harvey and Gaspare Aselli.

In 1644, Bartholin was offered a professorship in medicine at the University of Messina. Although he ultimately declined the offer, he travelled to Sicily to visit Pietro Castelli, a prominent Italian botanist and the founder of the Hortus Messanensis (the Messina Botanical Garden). During his visit, he spent time studying the exotic and medicinal plants in the garden, which Castelli had organised using a new classification method, and developed strong ties of friendship with the Italian botanist.

In 1663 Bartholin bought Hagestedgård, which burned down in 1670 including his library, with the loss of many manuscripts. King Christian V of Denmark appointed Bartholin as his physician with a substantial salary and freed the farm from taxation as recompense for the loss. In 1680 Bartholin's health failed, the farm was sold, and he moved back to Copenhagen, where he died on 4 December 1680. He was buried in Vor Frue Kirke (Church of Our Lady).

The Bartholinsgade, a street in Copenhagen, is named for the family. Nearby is the Bartholin Institute (Bartholin Institutet). One of the buildings of the University of Aarhus is named after him.

== Contributions to medical research ==
In December 1652, Bartholin published the first full description of the human lymphatic system. Jean Pecquet had previously noted the lymphatic system in animals in 1651, and Pecquet's discovery of the thoracic duct and its entry into the veins made him the first person to describe the correct route of the lymphatic fluid into the blood. Shortly after the publication of Pecquet's and Bartholin's findings, a similar discovery of the human lymphatic system was published by Olof Rudbeck in 1653, although Rudbeck had presented his findings at the court of Queen Christina of Sweden in April–May 1652, before Bartholin, but delayed in writing about it until 1653 (after Bartholin). As a result, an intense priority dispute ensued. Niels Stensen or Steno became Bartholin's most famous pupil.

Thomas' publication De nivis usu medico observationes variae Chapter XXII, contains the first known mention of refrigeration anaesthesia, a technique whose invention Thomas Bartholin credits to the Italian Marco Aurelio Severino of Naples. According to Bartholin, Severino was the first to present the use of freezing mixtures of snow and ice (1646), and Thomas Bartholin initially learnt about the technique from him during a visit to Naples.

Bartholin–Patau syndrome, a congenital syndrome of multiple abnormalities produced by trisomy 13, was first described by Bartholin in 1656.

Caspar Bartholin the Elder, Thomas Bartholin's father; his brother Rasmus Bartholin; and his son Caspar Bartholin the Younger (who first described "Bartholin's glands"), all contributed to the practice of modern medicine through their discoveries of important anatomical structures and phenomena. Bartholin the Elder started his tenure as professor at Copenhagen University in 1613, and over the next 125 years, the scientific accomplishments of the Bartholins while serving on the medical faculty of the University of Copenhagen won international acclaim and contributed to the reputation of the institution.

== Selected works ==
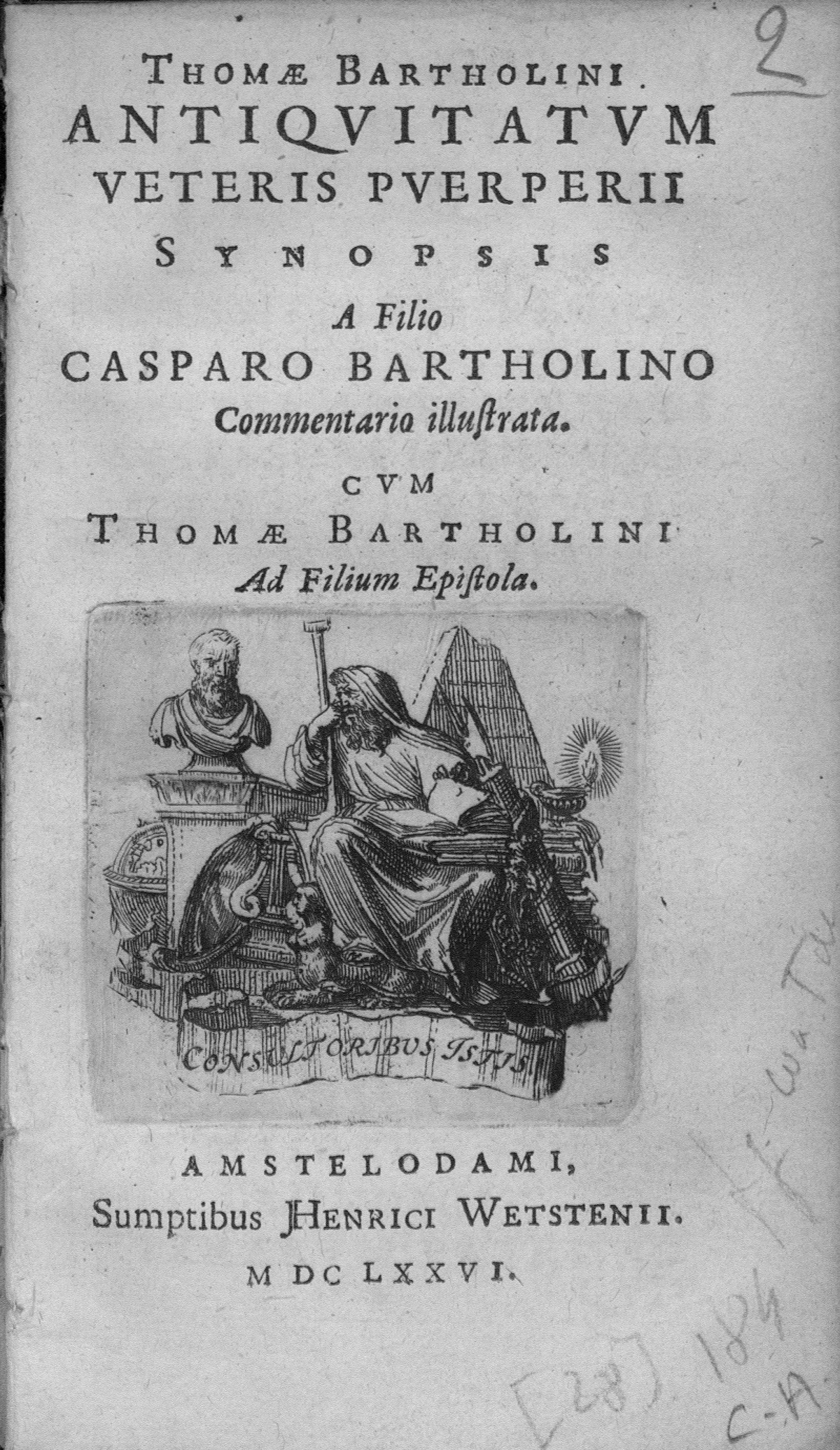
Antiquitatum veteris puerperii synopsis, 1676

- Historiarum anatomicarum rariorum [...] (Case histories of unusual anatomical and clinical structures, including descriptions and illustrations of anomalies and normal structures)
  - ... centuria I et II at Google Books, Amsterdam, 1654.
  - ... centuria III et IV at Google Books. The Hague: Vlacq, 1657.
  - ... centuria V et VI at Google Books, Copenhagen: P. Haubold, 1661 (with Mantissa anatomica, by Johannes Rodius).
- De unicornu. Padua, 1645.
- De Angina Puerorum Campaniae Siciliaeque Epidemica Exercitationes. Paris, 1646.
- De lacteis thoracicis in homine brutisque nuperrime observatis historia anatomica at Google Books, Copenhagen: M. Martzan, 1652 (Bartholin's discovery of the thoracic duct).
- Vasa lymphatica nuper Hafniae in animalibus inventa et hepatis exsequiae. Hafniae (Copenhagen), Petrus Hakius, 1653.
- Vasa lymphatica in homine nuper inventa. Hafniae (Copenhagen), 1654.
- Historarium anatomicarum rariorum centuria I-VI. Copenhagen, 1654–1661.
- Anatomia. The Hague. Ex typographia Adriani Vlacq, 1655.
- Dispensarium hafniense. Copenhagen, 1658.
- De nivis usu medico observationes variae. Accessit D. Erasmi Bartholini de figura nivis dissertatio. With a book by Rasmus Bartholin. Copenhagen: Typis Matthiase Godichii, sumptibus Petri Haubold, 1661. (Contains the first known mention of refrigeration anaesthesia)
- Cista medica hafniensis. Copenhagen, 1662.
- De pulmonum substantia et motu. Copenhagen, 1663.
- De insolitis partus humani viis. Copenhagen, 1664.
- De medicina danorum domestica. Copenhagen, 1666.
- De flammula cordis epistola. Copenhagen, 1667.
- Orationes et dissertationes omnino varii argumenti. Copenhagen, 1668.
- Carmina varii argumenti. Copenhagen, 1669.
- De medicis poetis dissertatio. Hafinae, apud D. Paulli, 1669.
- De bibliothecae incendio. Copenhagen, 1670.
- De morbis biblicis miscellanea medica. Francofurti, D. Paulli, 1672.
- De cruce Christi hypomnemata IV, Typis Andreae ab Hoogenhuysen, Vesaliae (Wesel), 1673.
- Acta medica et philosophica. 1673–1680.

== Bibliography ==
- Brandt Andersen, Jesper (2025). Thomas Bartholin: Physician and Anatomist. Aarhus University Press. ISBN 978-8775979929.
