= Church of Our Lady, Copenhagen =

Coordinates: 55°40′46″N 12°34′22″E

Church of Our Lady
- Vor Frue Kirke
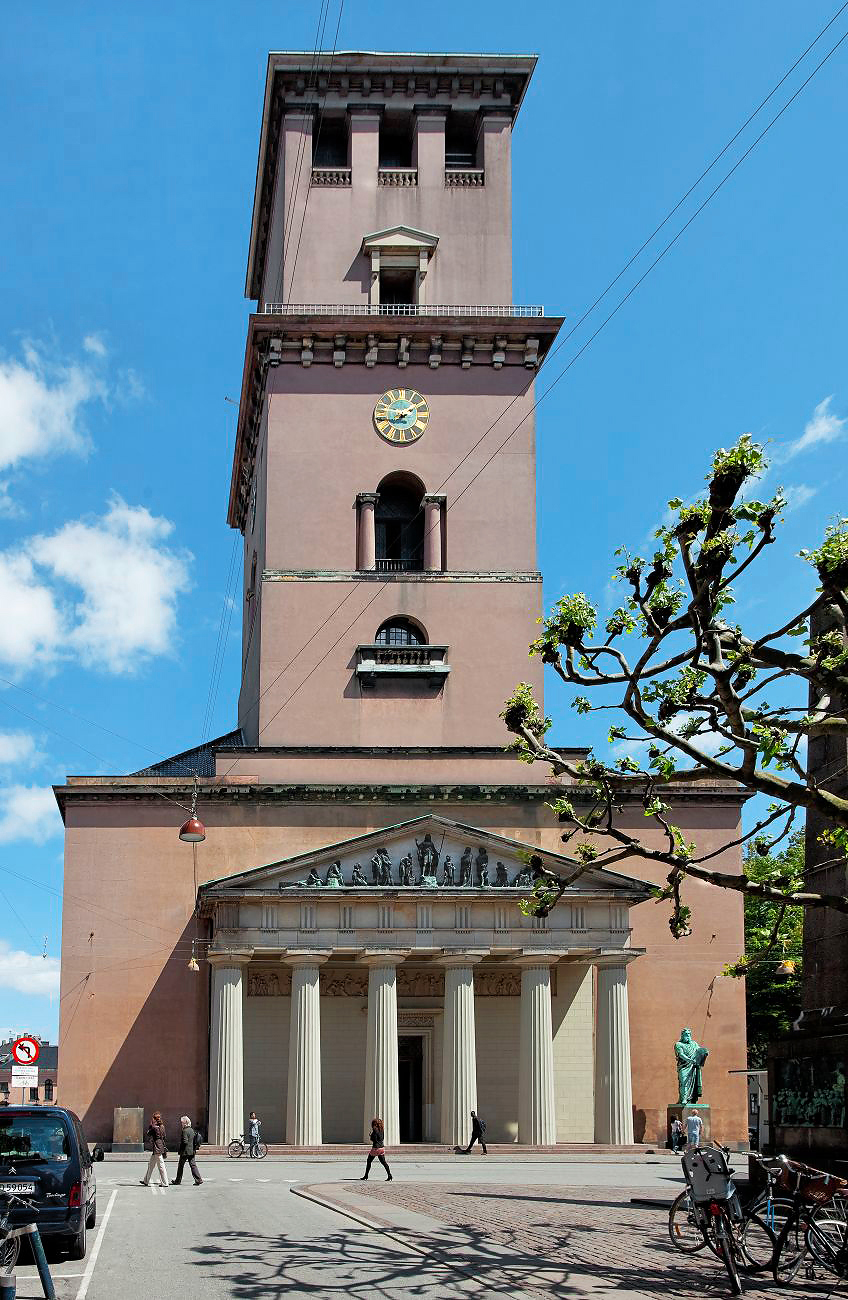
- Church of Our Lady
- Location: Copenhagen
- Country: Denmark
- Denomination: Church of Denmark
- Previous denomination: Roman Catholic
- Website: www.domkirken.dk

History
- Status: Cathedral & Parish church
- Founded: 1187
- Founder: Absalon
- Dedication: Virgin Mary
- Consecrated: 7 June 1829

Architecture
- Functional status: Active
- Architect: Christian Frederik Hansen
- Style: Neo-Classicism
- Years built: 1817–1829
- Groundbreaking: 1 November 1817
- Completed: 1829; 197 years ago

Specifications
- Capacity: 1184 seats
- Length: 86 m (282 ft 2 in)
- Width: 33 m (108 ft 3 in)

Administration
- Diocese: Copenhagen
- Parish: Vor Frue

Clergy
- Bishop: Peter Skov-Jakobsen
- Priest(s): Steffen Ringgaard Andresen; Eva-Maria Schwarz; Stine Munch; Signe Malene Berg; Christian Monrad

The Church of Our Lady (Danish: Vor Frue Kirke) is the Lutheran cathedral of Copenhagen. It is situated on the Frue Plads public square in central Copenhagen, next to the historic main building of the University of Copenhagen.

The present-day version of the church was designed by the architect Christian Frederik Hansen (1756–1845) in the Neoclassical style and was completed in 1829.

== History ==
Construction of the original Collegiate Church of St. Mary (den hellige Marias kirke) began no later than 1187 under archbishop Absalon (c. 1128–1201). The church was located on the highest point near the new town of Havn, later Copenhagen. Absalon was the bishop of Roskilde (Zealand), Denmark's capital of that era, and spent most of his life securing Denmark from foreign attacks. He built many churches and monasteries, while also founding Copenhagen as Denmark's Baltic port city. Named archbishop of Lund in 1178, Absalon accepted only under threat of excommunication. St. Mary's construction continued sporadically until 1209, when it was consecrated by Absalon's successor, bishop Peder Sunesen (c. 1161–1214) on Annunciation Sunday in March, which became the church's traditional feast day. The church was built in Romanesque style with its half-rounded arches inside and out.

In 1314, a fire destroyed the limestone church so completely that it was rebuilt in the popular new building material of the day, oversized red brick. The style of building was Gothic, with its typical pointed arches. The rebuilding of the simple church with a long nave and choir continued until 1388. Due to a lack of money, the great tower was not built until the reign of king Christian II. It was as high as the church was long, and from artwork of the day, out of proportion to the size of the church.

A school was established early on. In 1479, parts of the church school received a charter and become the University of Copenhagen. Professors were brought from Cologne, Germany. The international faculty widened Denmark's exposure to the great ideas and philosophies of the day. The university challenged the growth of the Protestant movement, but was eventually closed. By 1537 it reopened as a centre for Lutheran studies.

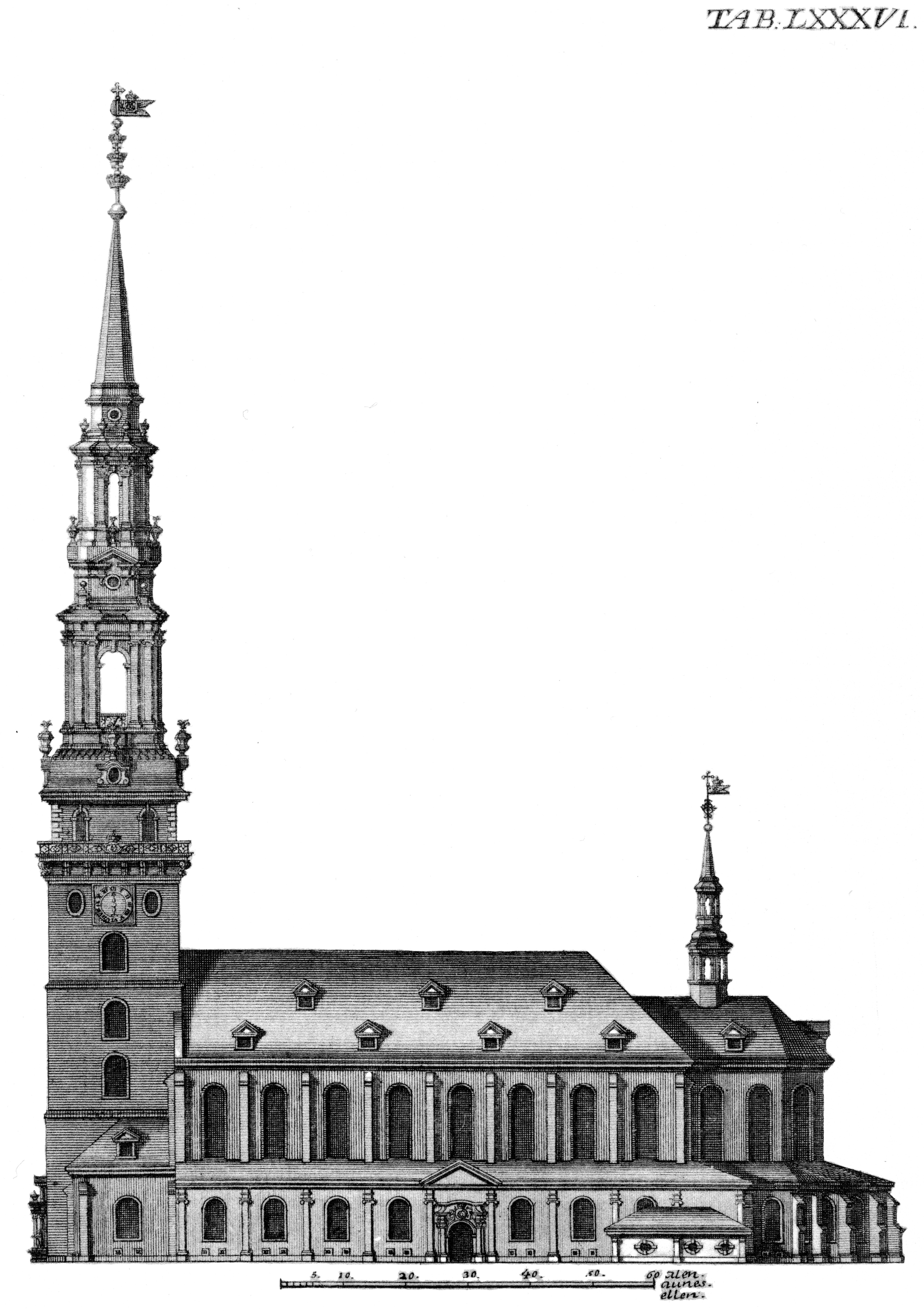
The rebuilt cathedral in the 18th century

The Protestant Reformation was hard on St. Mary's. Citizens of Copenhagen had elected to follow Luther, but Roman Catholic officials at St Mary's tried to maintain the church as a centre of Catholic resistance to change in Copenhagen. By royal decree both Roman Catholic and Lutheran priests were commanded to use the church jointly, which incensed the majority of Copenhagen's population. On 27 December 1530 hundreds of citizens stormed St. Mary's, destroying every statue and dismantling the choir stalls. The 17 richly gilt altars were stripped of jewels and gold and smashed, as were reliquaries, vestments and altar equipment. Even the name "St. Mary's" became Our Lady's Church (Vor Frue Kirke), keeping the historic reference to the Virgin Mary without the use of the un-Lutheran "Saint" appellation.

Just a year later Our Lady Church celebrated the acceptance of the Lutheran order of worship presided over by Johannes Bugenhagen (1485–1558), an associate of Martin Luther. 1539 saw the installation of the first Lutheran superintendents, later bishops, of Denmark. In 1568 the dean of Our Lady Church was charged with defining accepted practice for Lutheran church services in Denmark under the direction of the Bishop of Zealand. Ever since, the dean (and later bishop) of Our Lady Church has carried out that role in the Danish National Church.

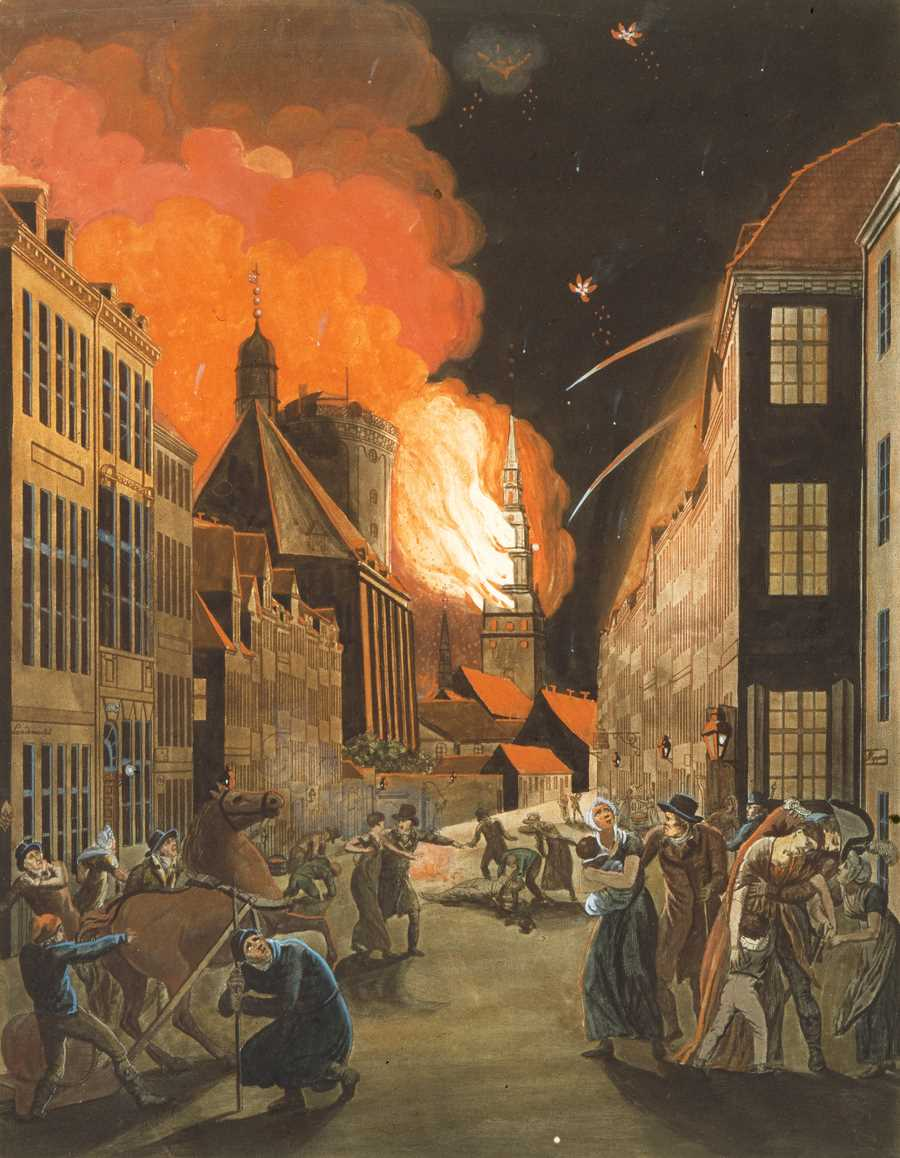
The spire of the Church of Our Lady on fire in 1807, as painted by Christoffer Wilhelm Eckersberg. To the left of the church: the Round Tower and the Trinitatis complex.

Lightning strikes damaged the church in 1573 and 1585, and some of the vaulting, tower, and roof collapsed after the resulting fires. The tower was eventually demolished, but rebuilt by 1609. It had an extremely tall pyramidal central spire with four shorter spires at each corner.

The medieval proto-cathedral was completely destroyed by a four-day-long conflagration in October 1728 which destroyed a third of the city. All the many chapels and eighty epitaphs commemorating some of Denmark's most prominent nobles and wealthy parishioners vanished. A decade later, the church was reconstructed, essentially on the same plan as the medieval church, in red brick with a simple long nave and rounded choir added at the end and ornate sandstone doorways beneath the spire. The interior combined Gothic and with the ornate Baroque style of the time. Ranks of tall half-round windows let in natural light, and ribbed brick vaulting arched high overhead from two long rows of squared pillars supporting the roof. A row of side chapels ringed the nave and choir giving the appearance of a five-aisled church which impressed all who entered, including King Christian VI who oversaw the building's progress with impatience. Friederich Ehbisch (1672–1748) carved a magnificent new altarpiece and pulpit in the finest Baroque tradition. The best-preserved ancient gravestones from the floor of the old church were replaced in the floor, although not in the same locations.

After the 1728 fire, the new tower rose, higher than the previous one tapering to a tall spire modeled after the spire of St. Martin in the Fields in London. The bells from the former St. Nikolai Church (Sankt Nikolaj Kirke) were moved to the new spire in 1743 and a set of four new bells were cast and added. The largest bell, "The King's Bell", weighed just over 6000 kg. Eventually, the tower held 42 bells. It was popular at the time to pay for extra ringing after weddings and funerals, which was a source of complaint by university students who were trying to study. A smaller tower in the same style was added to the roofline above the choir.

In September 1807, the cathedral was destroyed during the bombardment of Copenhagen by a British Royal Navy fleet under Admiral James Gambier during the Napoleonic Wars. The bombardment began after British demands for the city to surrender was rejected; Gambier's fleet bombarded Copenhagen itself and nearby coastal forts for three days. During the bombardment, British gunners used the cathedral's tower for range practice, setting it ablaze, which in turn burned the cathedral to the ground, along with nearby sections of Copenhagen.

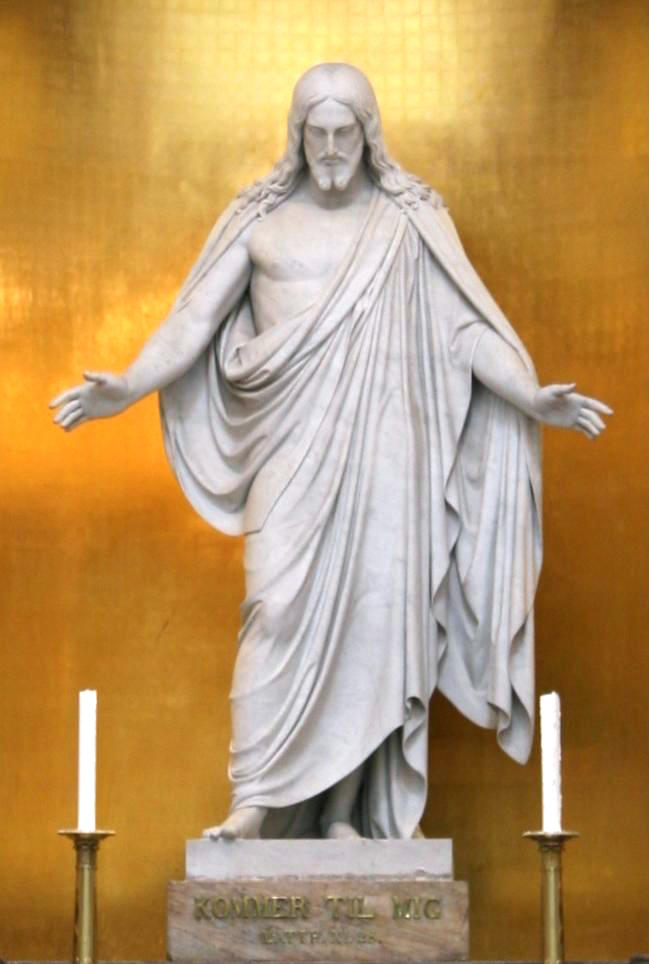
Christus in the Church of Our Lady, Copenhagen, by Bertel Thorvaldsen

Denmark's finest architect, Christian Frederik Hansen, and the city magistrate redesigned the cathedral in the Neo-Classical style. Due to a lack of resources they incorporated elements of the surviving walls. The old surviving vaulting was blown up to make way for a church built in the new style. A pillared portico and a flat interior ceiling and simple classical lines are very different from the medieval church. The cornerstone was laid in 1817 and the work completed by Whitsun Day 1829. Bertel Thorvaldsen (1770–1844) was commissioned to decorate the interior with statues of Jesus Christ and the apostles; Judas Iscariot replaced by St. Paul. Other artists also contributed sculptures and paintings. Thorvaldsen carved and donated the modern font as a personal gift.

The tower, based on the older medieval tower, became a controversial afterthought. The Neo-Classical style did not include towers, but citizens demanded and got a tower modeled on the older medieval tower. The tower is 60 meters high and contains four bells. The oldest bell is cast in 1490 by Oluf Kegge. The next one was cast in 1699 by Friderich Holtzmann. The next one was cast in 1828 by Søren Hansen Hornhaver. The newest bell was cast in 1876 by Anker Heegaard.

Our Lady Church was designated Denmark's National Cathedral in 1924. Its relatively recent cathedral status stems from the splitting of Zealand (Sjælland) into two Lutheran dioceses in 1922.

Major renovation organized by Professor Vilhelm Wohlert (1920–2007) in 1977–79 removed various additions that had accrued in the interior of the church over the years. Marcussen & Søn built a new large central organ in 1995, with a choir organ added in 2002. The crypt has been converted into a museum which contains models of the various iterations of the building.

== Architecture ==
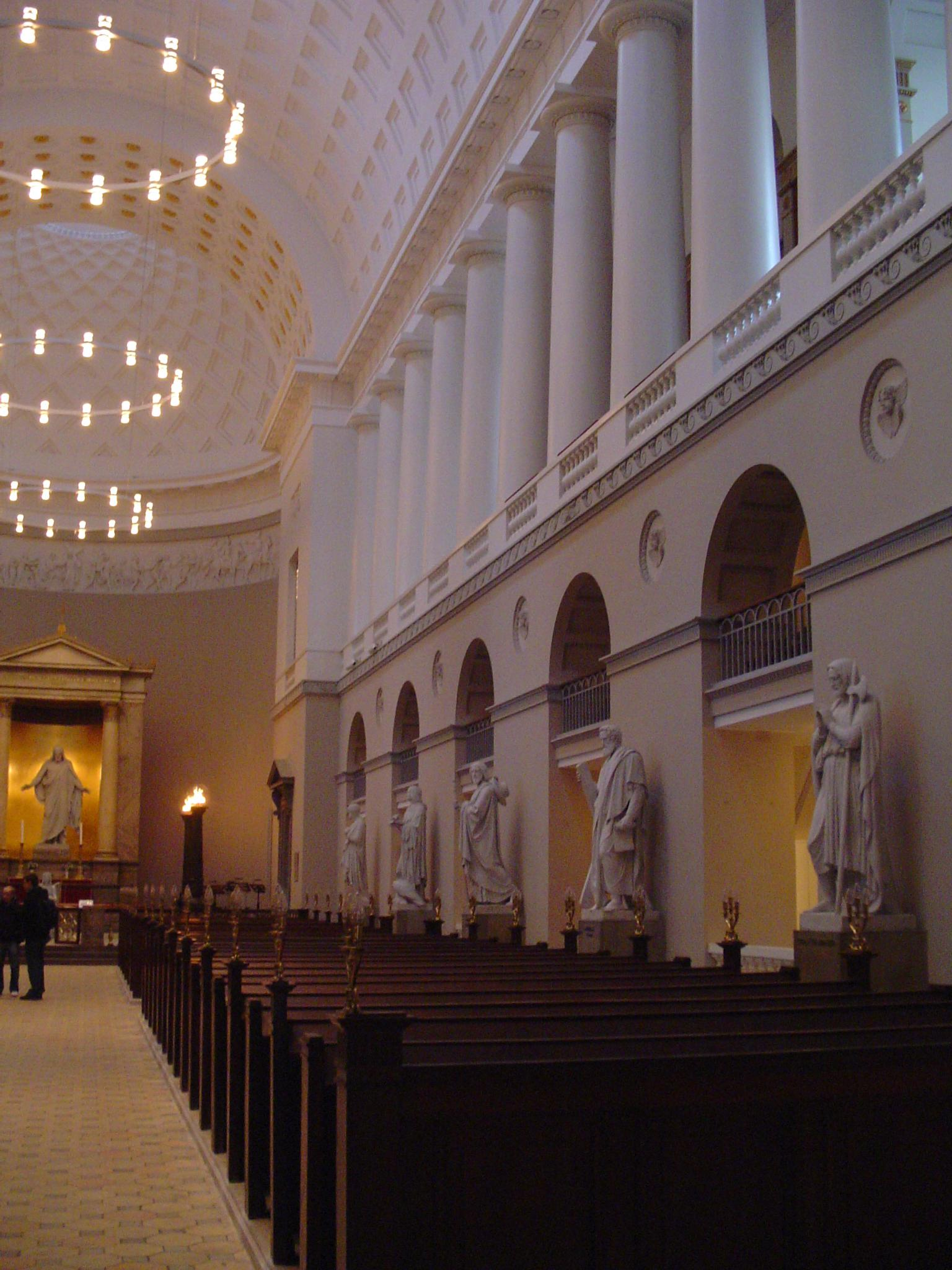
Statues by Bertel Thorvaldsen depicting Jesus Christ and his Apostles

The building measures 83 m in length and 33 m in width. The interior of the nave is 60 m long and over 25 m from floor to ceiling. With all galleries open, the church can seat more than 1100 people. The tower is 60 m high and houses the four church bells. Stormklokken weighs 4 tons and is the largest bell in Denmark. The smallest bell in the tower is used at morning service among other occasions. It is the oldest bell in the country, dating from 1490 and taken from the former Antvorskov Kloster in Slagelse.

The pediment is decorated with bronzes of Jesus Christ and the Apostles. The interior is likewise decorated with the twelve apostles (one in front of each of the piers of the central nave), the Risen Christ displaying the wounds in his body (in a niche above the altar) and in front of the altar the baptismal font in the form of an angel holding a large scallop shell, all in Italian carrara marble. All of these sculptures were completed in Rome by the famous Danish sculptor Bertel Thorvaldsen. In the aisles, a bronze bust of Bertel Thorvaldsen, modeled by Herman Wilhelm Bissen (1798–1868) is on display along with many portraits of bishops and deans.

== Royal events in the church ==
- 1363 – Wedding of Margaret I of Denmark and King Håkon VI of Norway
- 28 October 1449 – Coronation and marriage of King Christian I of Denmark and Queen Dorothea of Brandenburg.
- 1536? – Coronation of King Christian III of Denmark.
- 1559 – Coronation of King Frederick II of Denmark.
- 17 August 1596 – Coronation of King Christian IV of Denmark.
- 1648 – Coronation of King Frederick III of Denmark.
- 14 May 2004 – Wedding of Frederik, Crown Prince of Denmark, and Mary Elizabeth Donaldson

== Burials ==
Burials in the church or former churchyard include:

- Cort Adeler (1622–1675), naval officer
- Caspar Bartholin (1558–1628), physician and theologian
- Thomas Bartholin (1616–1680), physician, mathematician and theologian
- Thomas Bartholin (1659–1690), historian
- Henrik Bornemann (1646–1710), clergyman and theologian
- Hans Brochmand (1594–1638), theologian and rector
- Jesper Brochmand (1585–1652), clergyman and theologian
- Poul Egede (1708–1789), theologian, linguist and missionary
- Thomas Fincke (1561–1656), mathematician and physicist
- Christian Foss (1626–1680), physician and Supreme Court justice
- Jens Foss (1629–1687), physician and councillor
- Matthias Foss (1627–1683), physician
- Christian Friis (1556–1616), statesman and landowner
- Johan Friis (1494–1570), statesman and landowner
- Johan Ludvig Holstein (1694–1763), statesman
- Christian Horrebow (1718–1776), astronomer
- Anders Krag (1553–1600), physicist, physician and rector
- Poul Madsen (1527–1590), clergyman
- Jacob Madsen Aarhus (538–1586), theologian and rector
- Árni Magnússon (1663–1730), scholar and collector
- Peder Palladius (1503–1560), clergyman and reformer
- Hans Hansen Resen (1596–1653), theologian and clergyman
- Hans Poulsen Resen (1561–1638), theologian and clergyman
- Christen Friis Rottbøll (1727–1797), physician and botanist
- Ole Rømer (1644–1710), astronomer
- Laurids Mortensen Scavenius (1589–1655), clergyman
- Peder Lauridsen Scavenius (1623–1685), jurist, civil servant, rector and landowner
- Gerhard Schøning (1722–1780), historian, writer and rector
- Johan Peter Suhr (1712–1785), merchant
- Jørgen Vind (1593–1644), statesman
- Christen Worm (1672–1737), theologian
- Ole Worm (1588–1654), physician, natural scientist, antiquarian and collector
- Marcus Wøldike (1699–1750), theologian

== Broadcast services ==
Each morning (except Sundays), between 8.05 and 8.25 local time, Danish public radio (DR) transmits a live act of worship from the cathedral, recordings of which can also be heard via the internet.

== Gallery ==
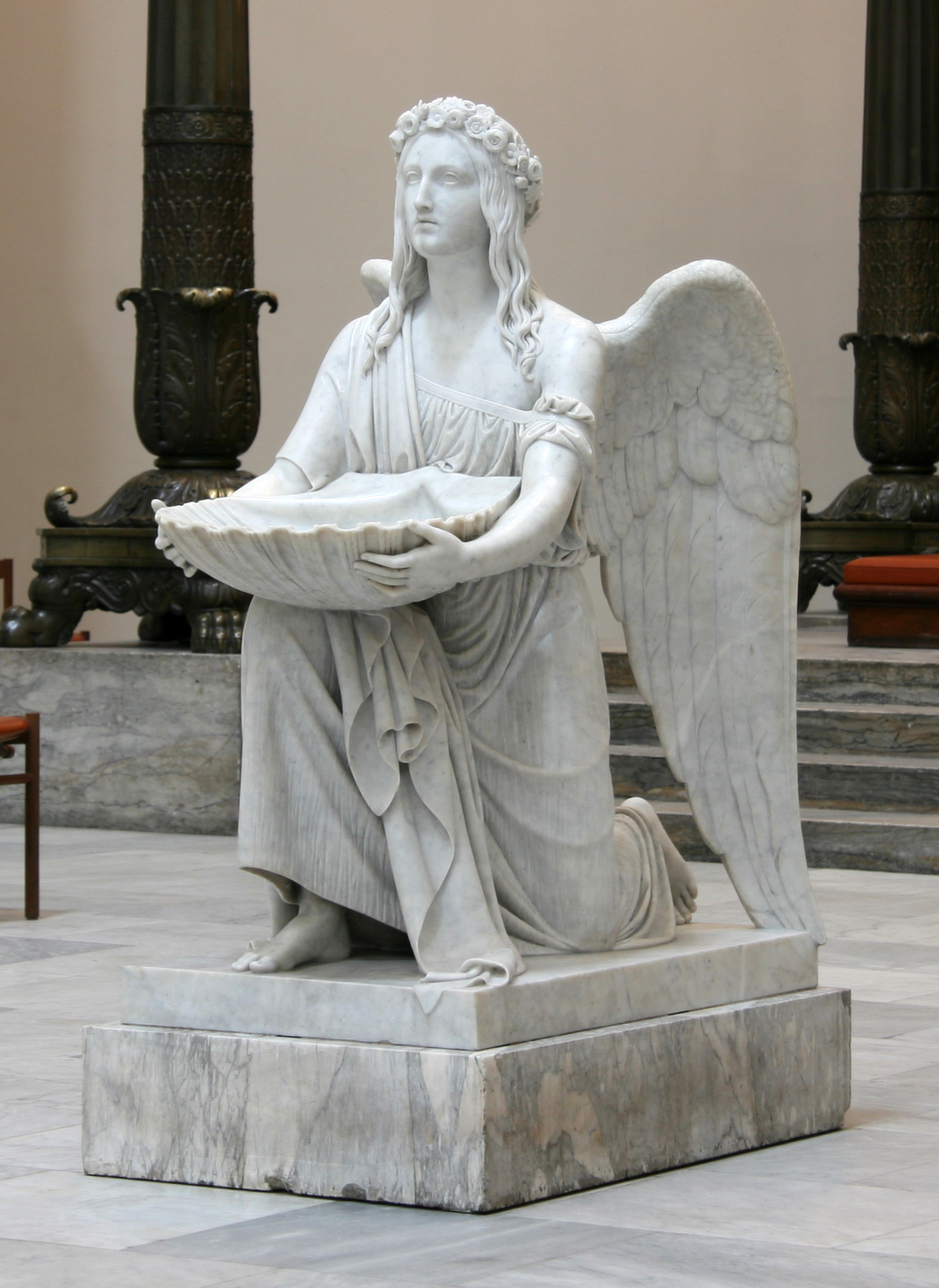
Baptismal font by Thorvaldsen

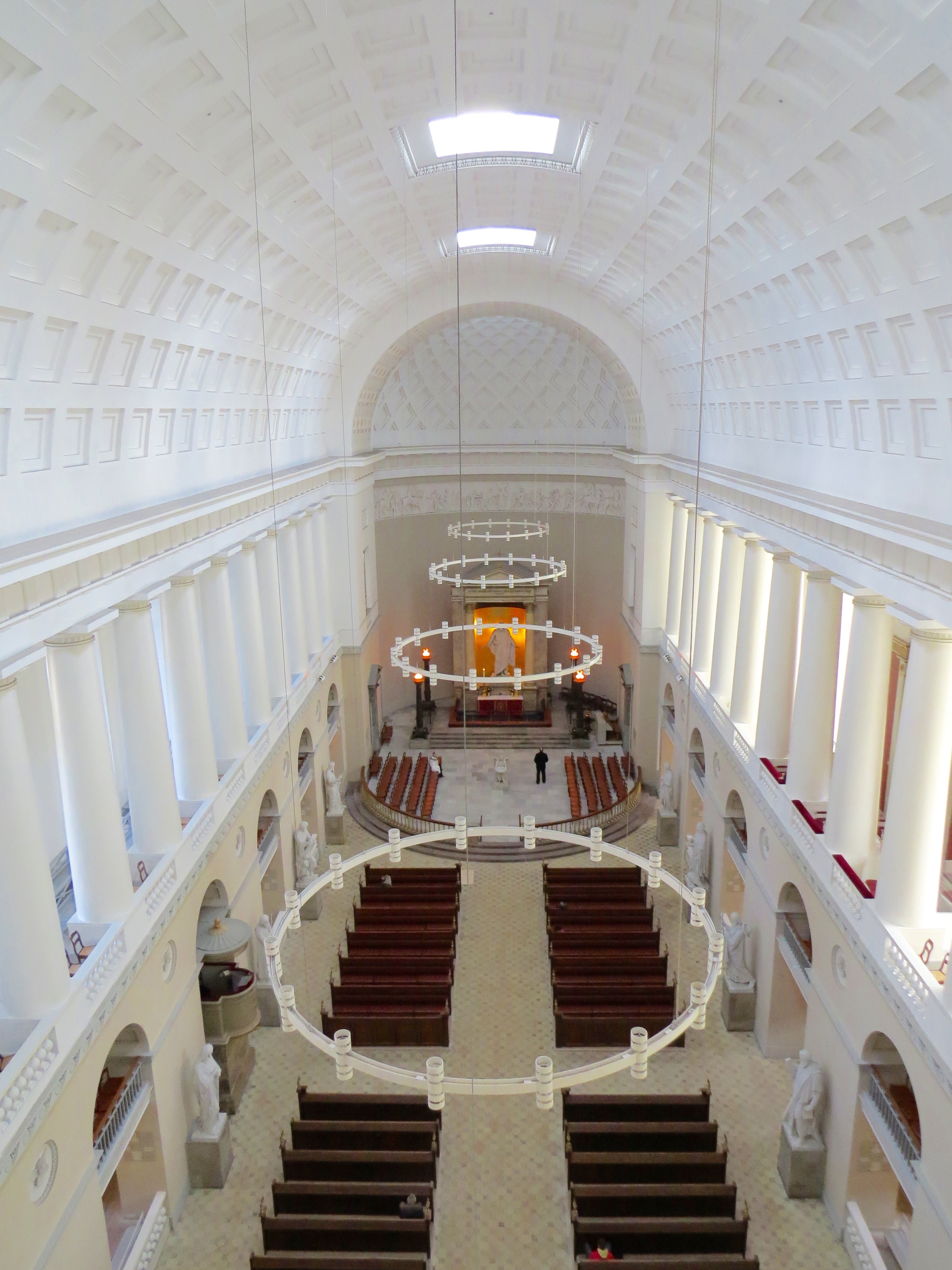
Ceiling

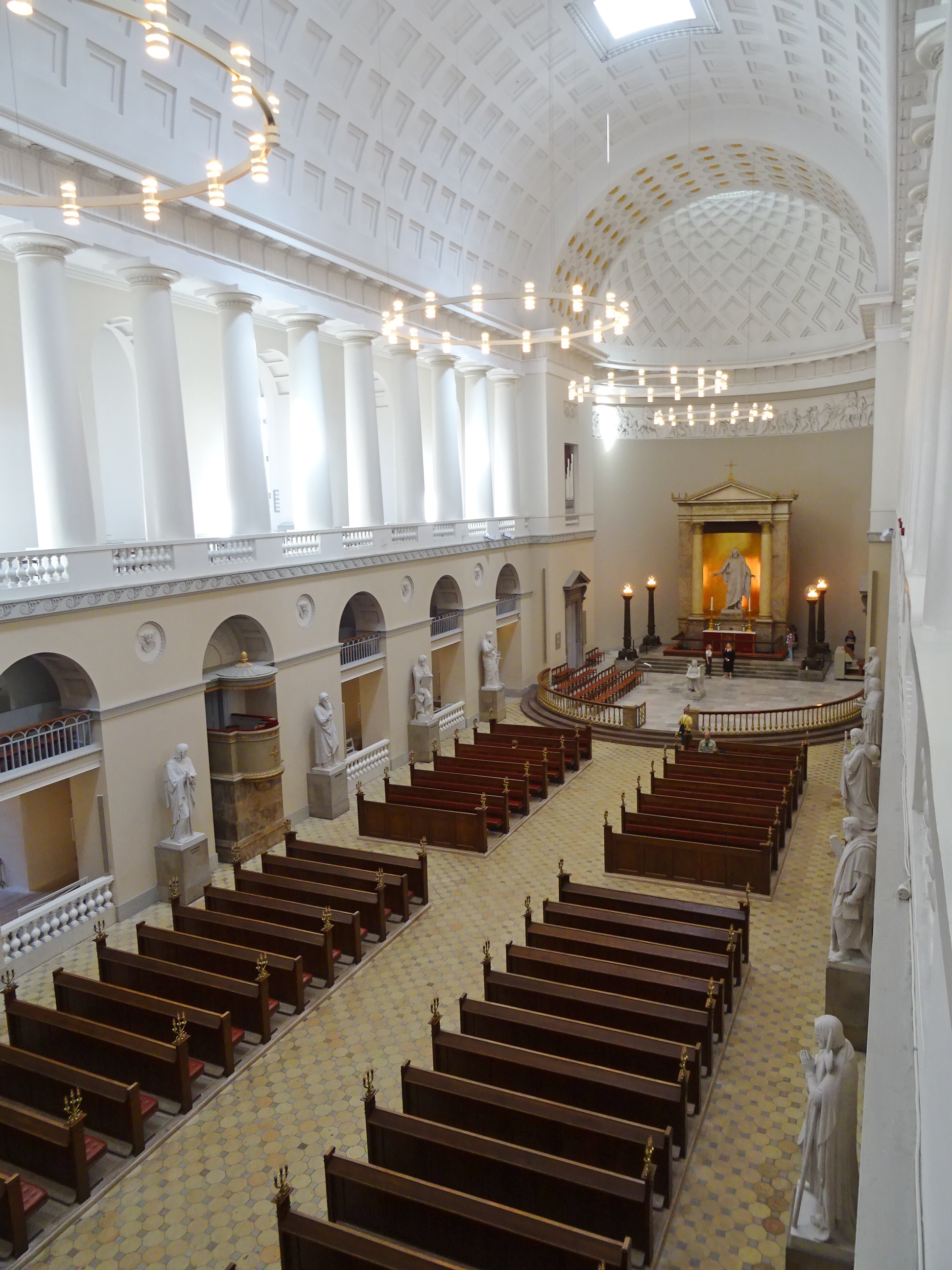
Interior

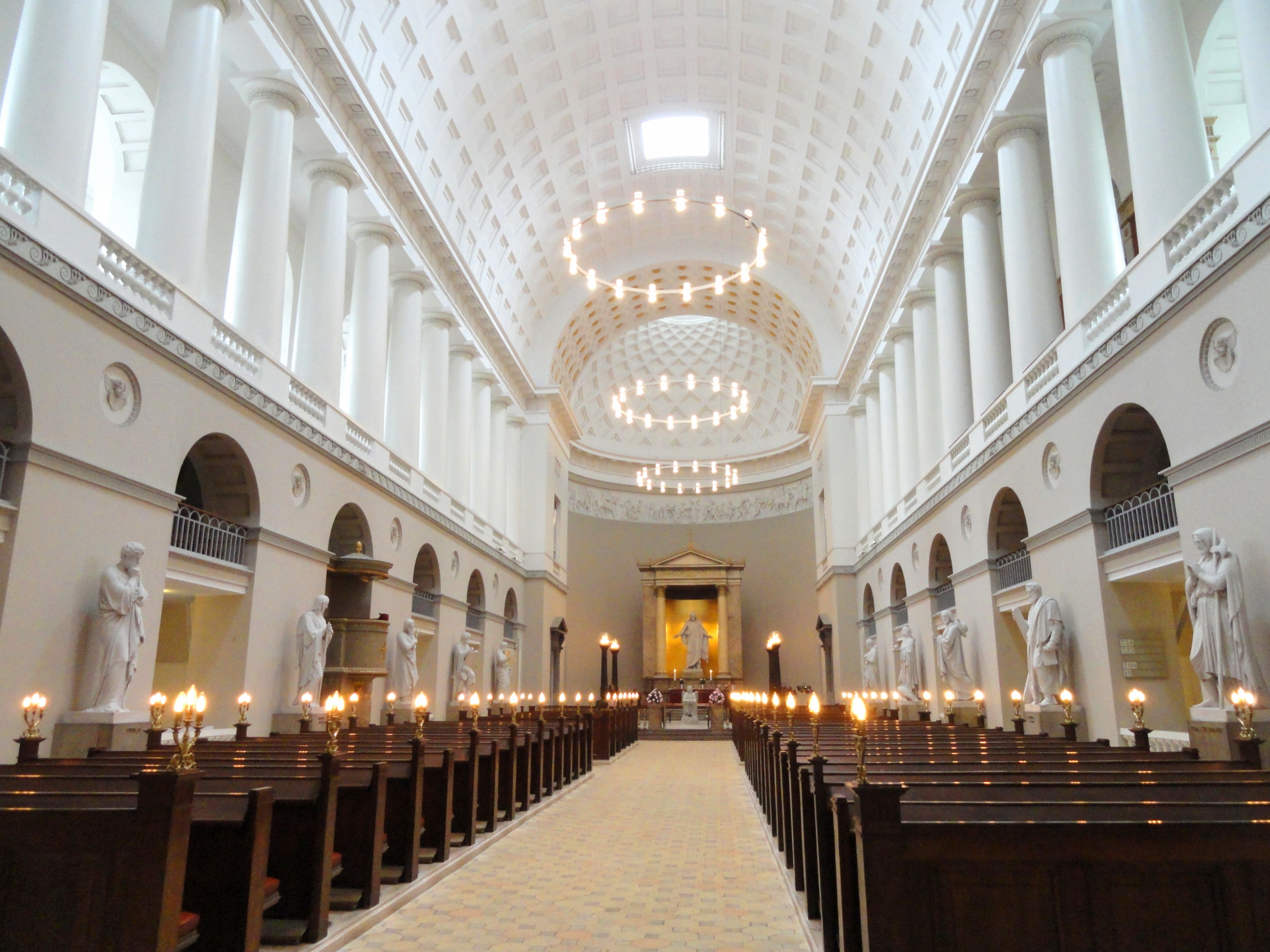
Nave

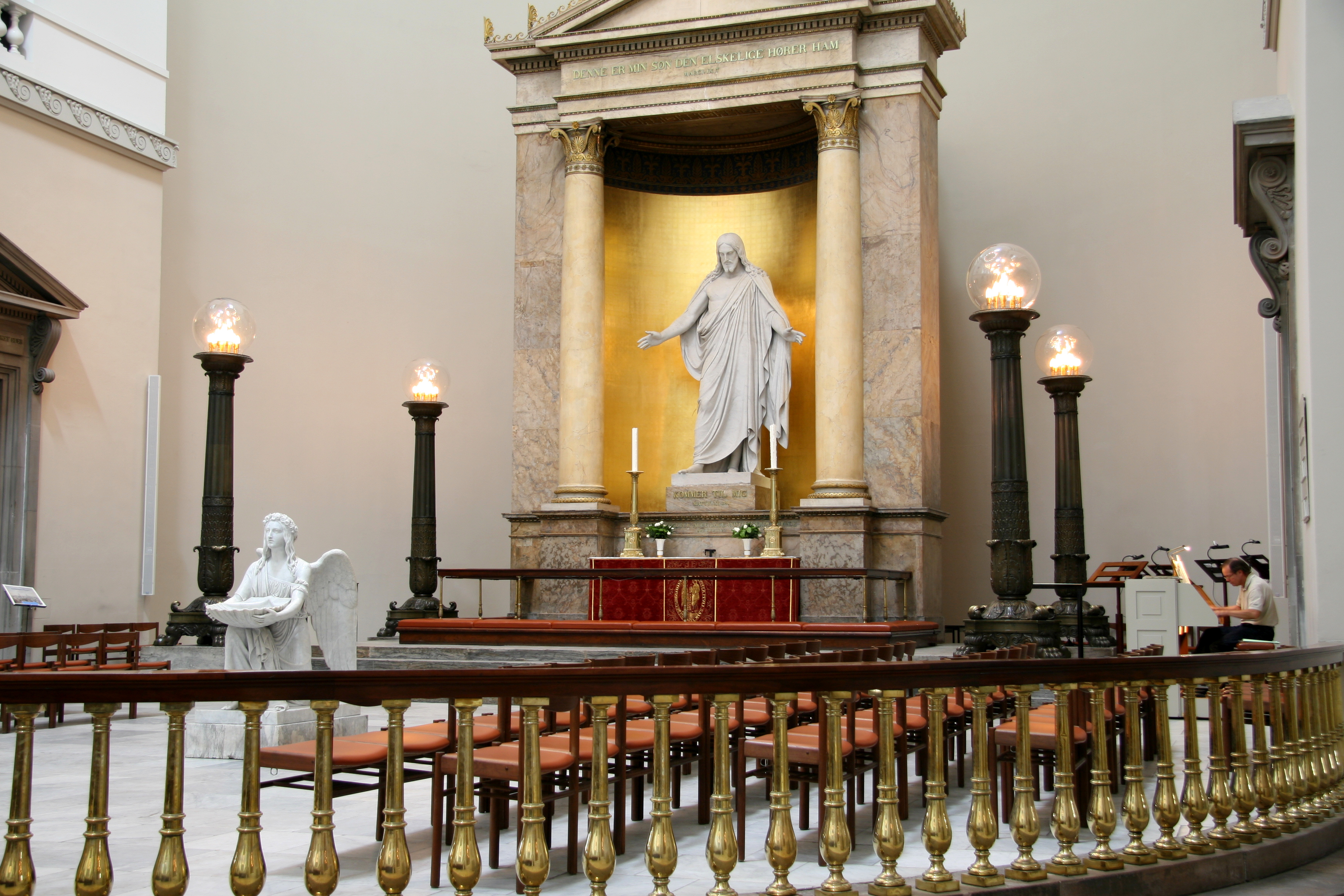
Choir and altar

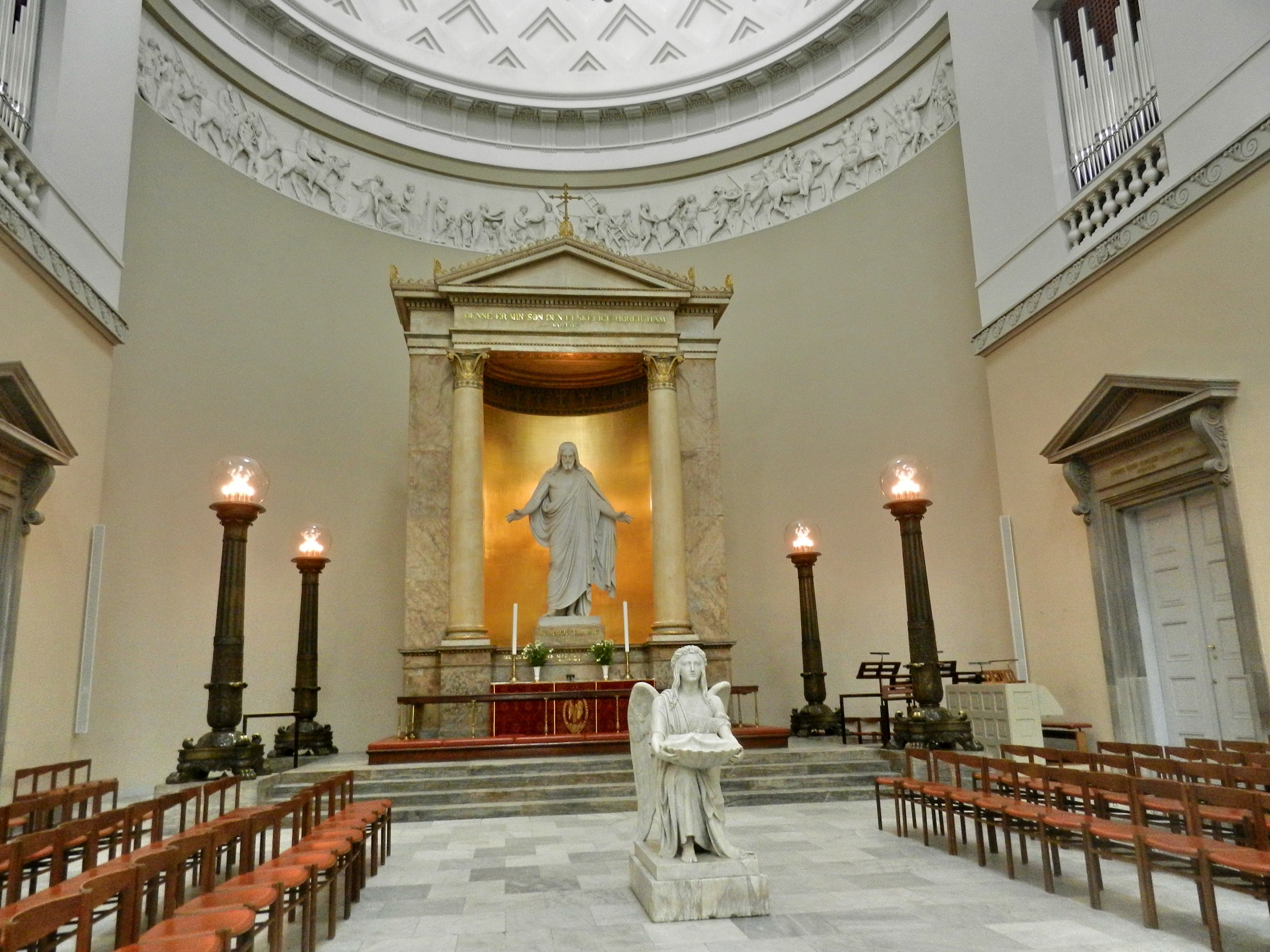
Shrine with the statue Christus

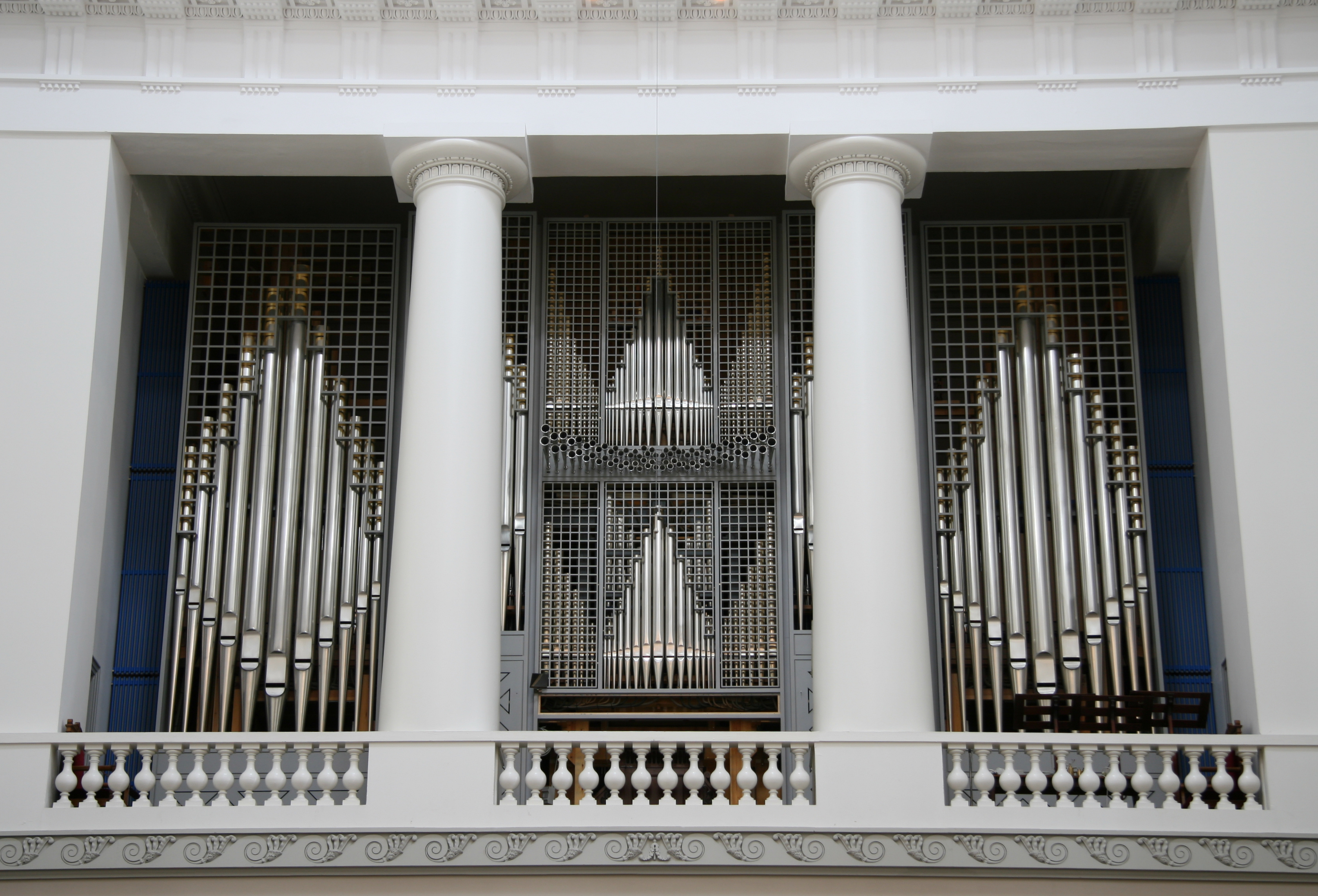
Organ

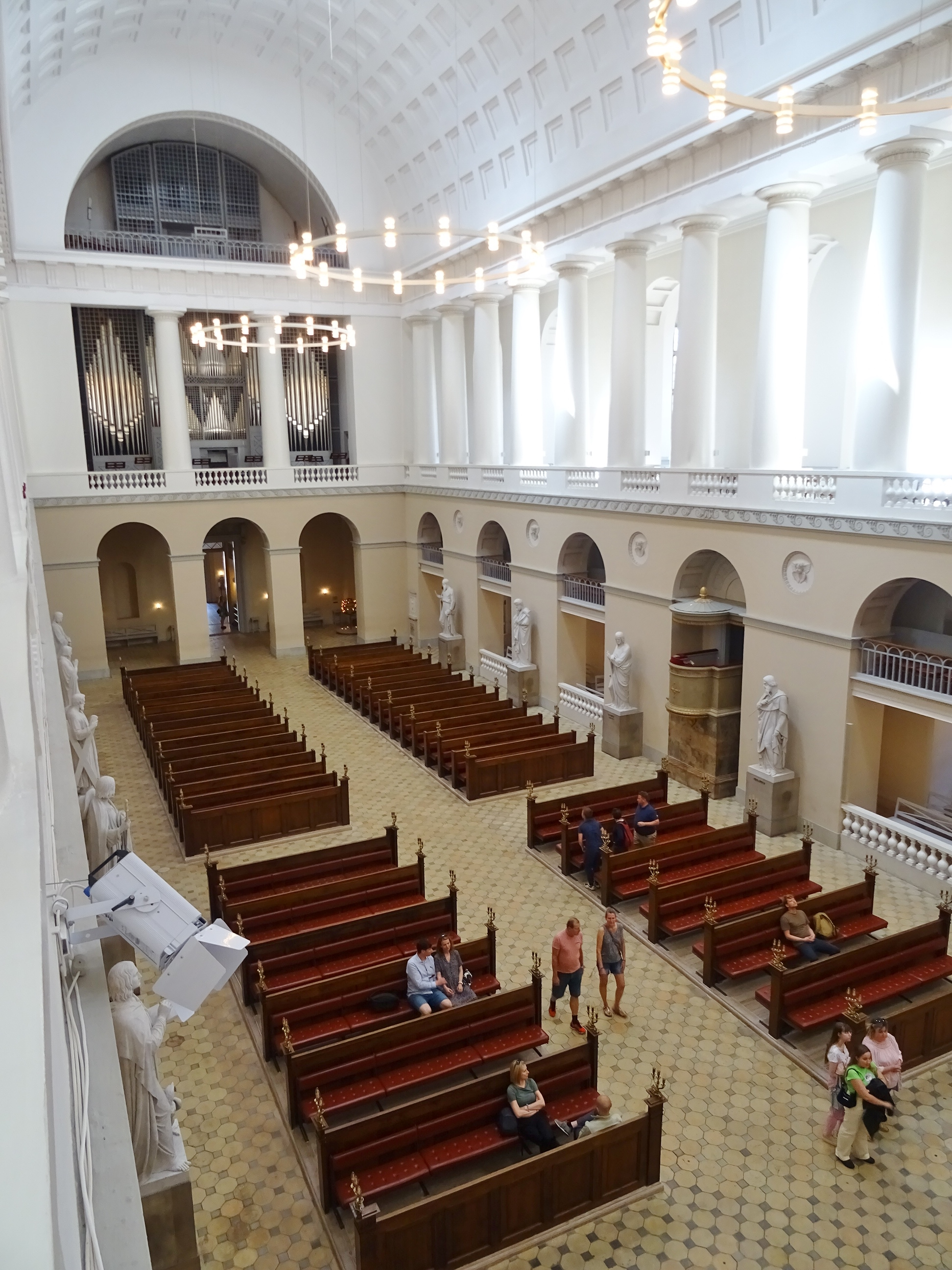
Interior

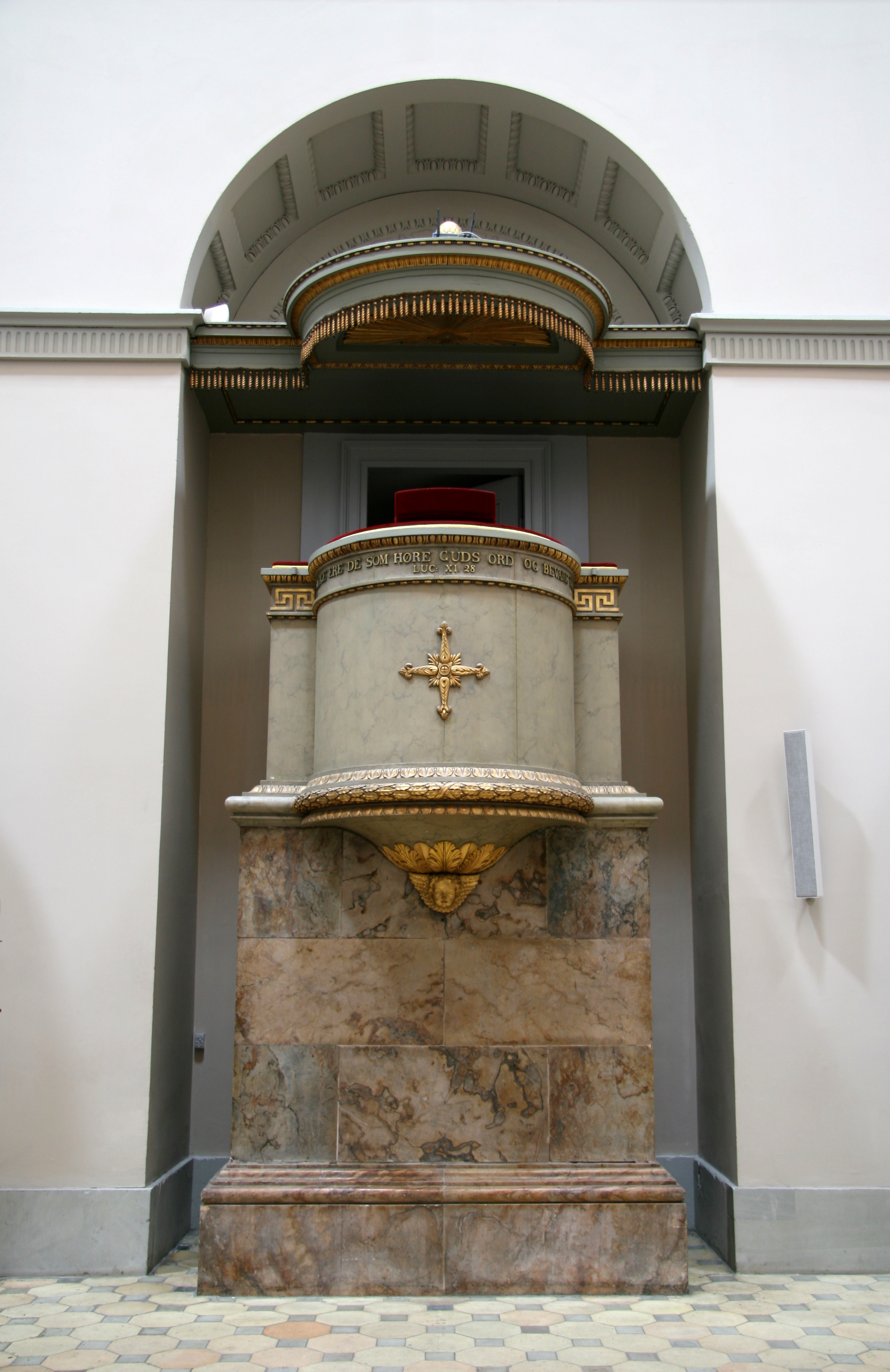
Pulpit

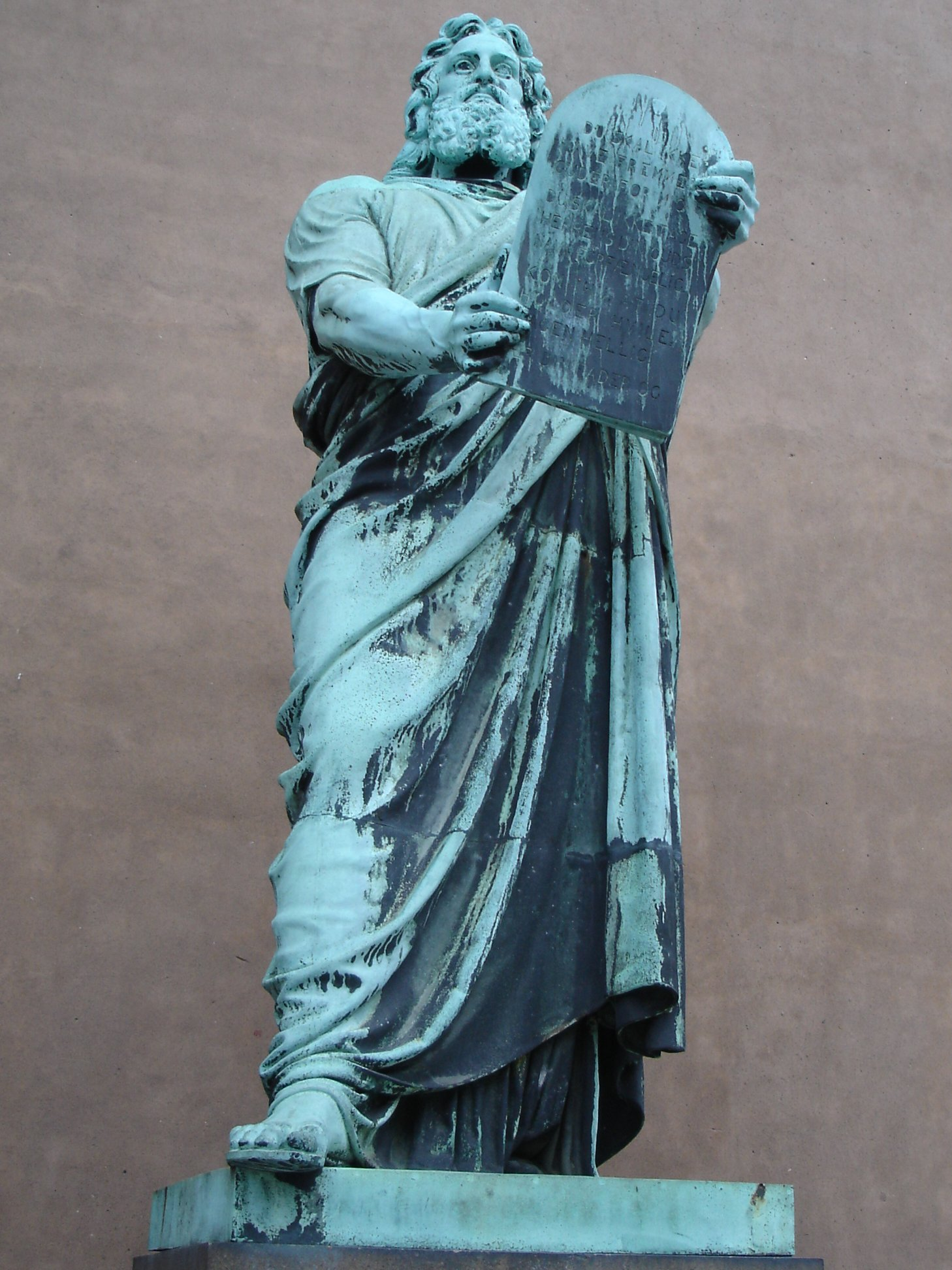
Moses statue by Herman Wilhelm Bissen
