= Bartholin gland carcinoma =

- Other names: Bartholin's gland cancer, Bartholin's gland carcinoma (morphologic abnormality), carcinoma of Bartholin's gland (disorder)
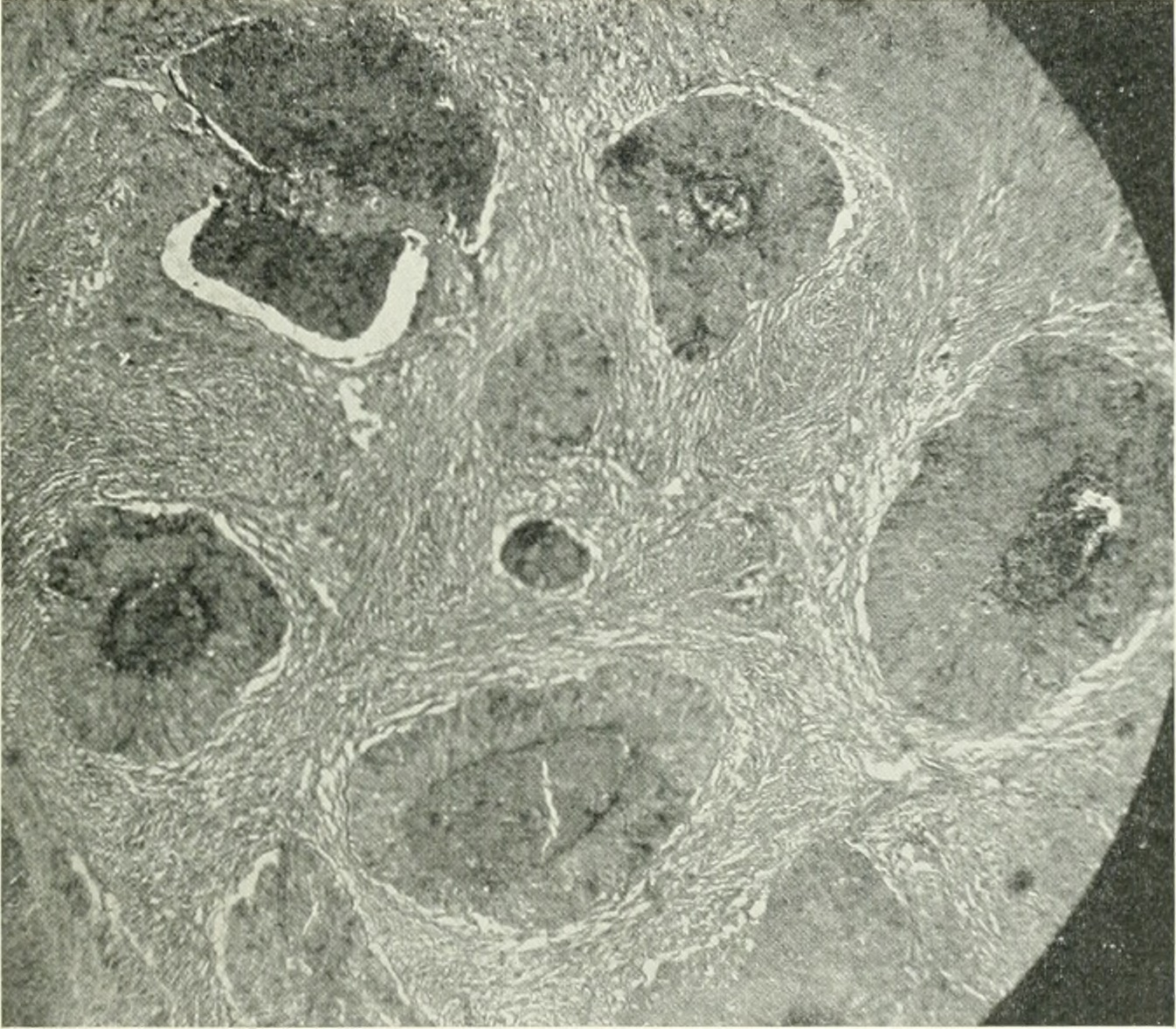
- Barthlin carcinoma tissue cross section
- Specialty: Oncology, gynecology
- Symptoms: Painless soft swelling at one side of the vaginal opening
- Usual onset: Typically in the 50s
- Causes: Unknown
- Frequency: Rare, <1% of all female genital tract cancer, <5% of vulvar cancer

Bartholin gland carcinoma is a type of cancer of the vulva arising in the Bartholin gland. It typically presents with a painless mass at one side of the vaginal opening in a female of middle-age and older, and can appear similar to a Bartholin cyst. The mass may be big or small, may be deep under skin or appear nearer the surface with overlying ulceration. Average age at presentation is 53-years.

The tumor can become large before a woman is aware of symptoms. One of the first symptoms can be painful sex. In other instances, there may be a mass or ulcer in the vulva area. Many clinicians assume that an enlarged Bartholin gland is malignant in a postmenopausal woman until proven otherwise. The growth of the tumor can spread to nearby areas such as the ischiorectal fossa and inguinal lymph nodes. Approximately 50% of bartholin gland carcinomas originate from squamous cell carcinomas. Another uncommon characteristic of Bartholin gland malignancies is that the growth of a lesion originates from the three types of epithelial tissue present in the gland: mucinous, transitional, and squamous.

It is rare, accounting for less than 1% of all female genital tract cancers and less than 5% of all vulva cancers.

== Cause ==
The cause is unknown.

== Diagnosis ==
Bartholin gland can be differentiated by histology to determine whether the malignancy is due to squamous cell carcinoma, adenoid cystic carcinoma, or adenocarcinoma.

== Management ==
Though Bartholin gland carcinoma is rare, along with other unusual Bartholin gland growths, it may not be the typical practice for clinicians to consider lesions malignant. Early diagnosis can help prevent the cancer from spreading from the glands to the surrounding area. Though malignancies of the Bartholin gland are rare, clinicians biopsy Bartholin gland lesions in older women or when the growth reoccurs or does not respond to the original treatment.

== Prognosis ==
The prognosis is optimistic if the growth has not metastasized to the lymph nodes.

== History ==
Bartholin glands were described in cattle by Casper Bartholin in 1677. Their existence in humans was postulated at that time. Treatment can be a vulvectomy that results in the removal of the growth and an extensive removal of adjacent tissue. An inguinal lymphadenectomy often accompanies the vulvectomy. The tissue that is removed sometimes includes sections of the vagina and rectum.

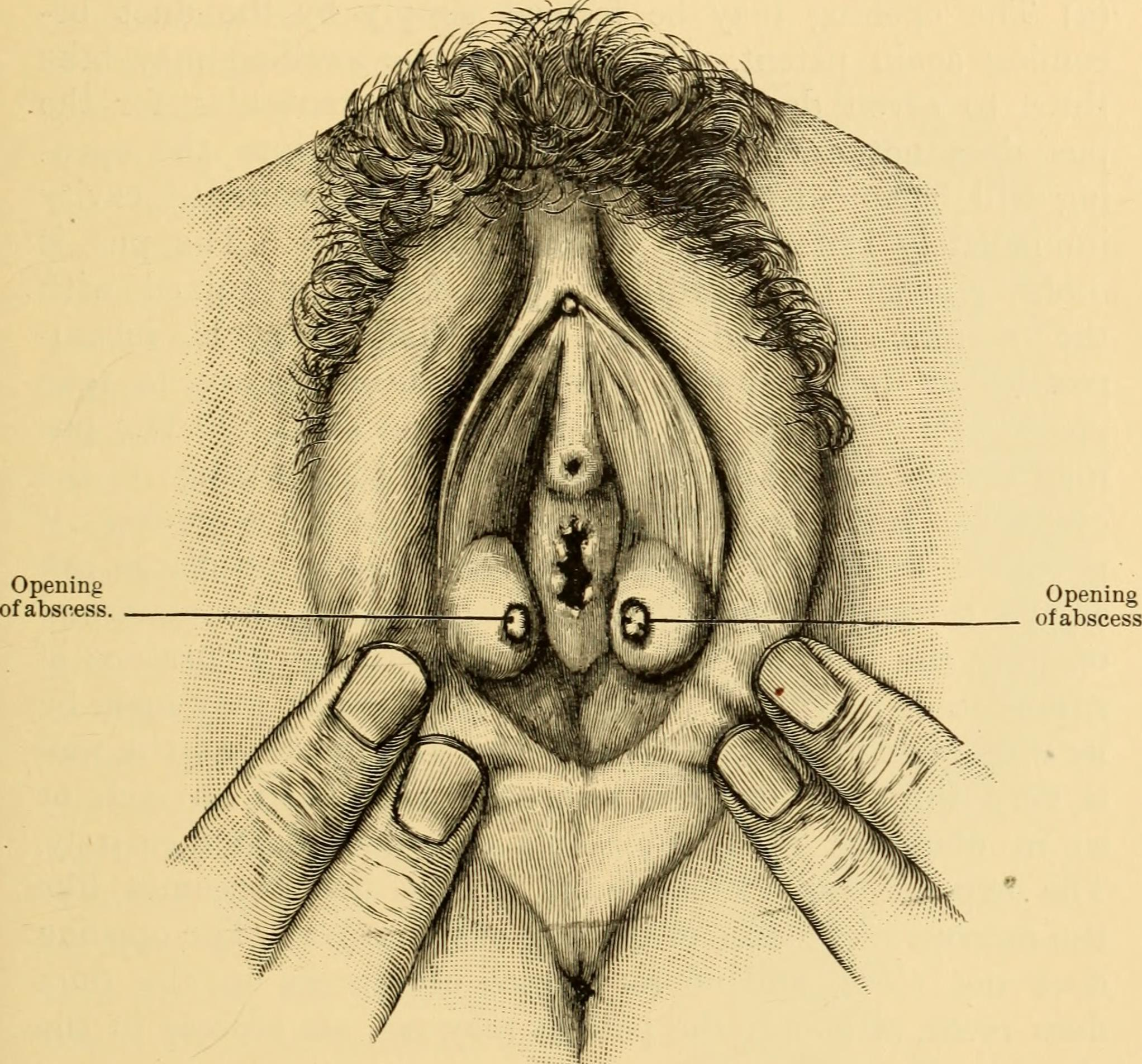
Illustration of Bartholin glands vaginal abscesses.

The adenoid cystic carcinoma of the Bartholin gland is another uncommon malignancy with symptoms that include local painful intermittent recurrences. The disease is slow to progress, but it can result in lung cancer after a long time after the initial treatment. Treatment consists of surgical removal of the growth. Sometimes, radiation and chemotherapy are performed.
