= Rasmus Bartholin =

Danish scientist, physician and grammarian (1625–1698)

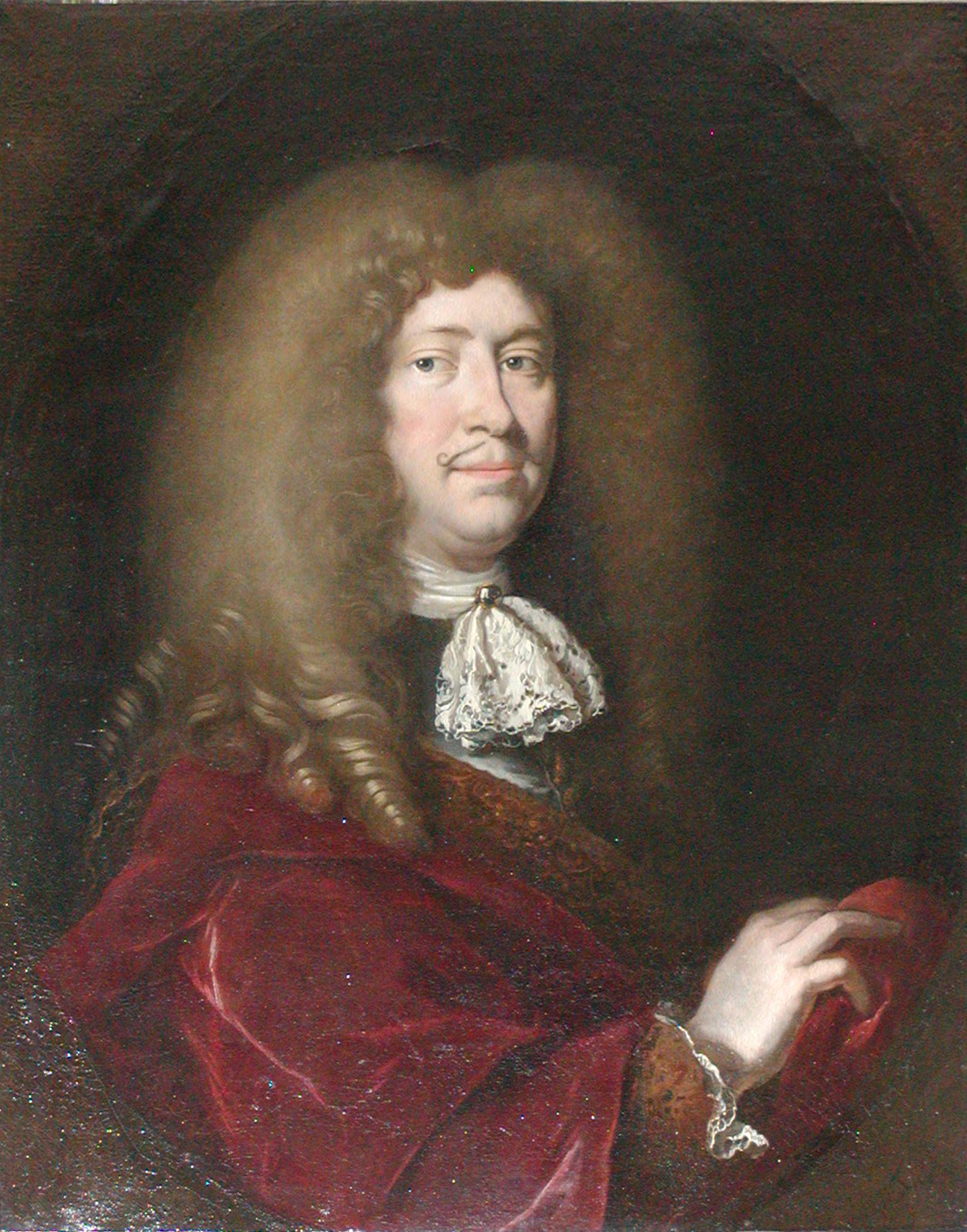
- Rasmus Bartholin
- Born: 13 August 1625; Roskilde
- Died: 4 November 1698 (aged 73); Copenhagen
- Known for: Double refraction of a light ray
- Scientific career
- Fields: Physics

Rasmus Bartholin (/bɑːrˈtoʊlɪn, ˈbɑːrtəlɪn/; Latinized: Erasmus Bartholinus; 13 August 1625 – 4 November 1698) was a Danish physician and grammarian.

== Biography ==
Bartholin was born in Roskilde. He was the son of Caspar Bartholin the Elder (1585–1629) and Anna Fincke, daughter of the mathematician Thomas Fincke.

As part of his studies, he travelled in Europe for ten years. He stayed in the Netherlands, England, France and Italy. In 1647, he took a Master's degree at the University of Copenhagen. In 1654, he received a Doctoral degree at the University of Padua.

He was a professor at the University of Copenhagen, first in Geometry, later in Medicine. He was also dean of the faculty of medicine, librarian, and rector. He wrote, in Latin, the first grammar of the Danish language, the 1657 De studio lingvæ danicæ.

Rasmus Bartholin is remembered especially for his discovery (1669) of the double refraction of a light ray by Iceland spar (calcite). He published an accurate description of the phenomenon, but since the physical nature of light was poorly understood at the time, he was unable to explain it. It was only after Thomas Young proposed the wave theory of light, c. 1801 that an explanation became possible.

== Personal ==
He was a younger brother of Thomas Bartholin (1616–1680).
