= Bartholin's cyst =

- Other names: Bartholin duct cyst, Bartholin gland cyst, cyst of Bartholin gland, bartholinitis
- Drawing of a Bartholin's cyst on the person's right side
- Specialty: Gynecology
- Symptoms: Swelling of one side of the vaginal opening, pain, sometimes no symptoms
- Complications: Abscess
- Usual onset: Childbearing age
- Causes: Unknown
- Diagnostic method: Based on symptoms and examination
- Differential diagnosis: Sebaceous cyst, hernia, hidradenitis suppurativa, folliculitis, vulvar cancer, hematoma, gonorrhea, syphilis, genital wart
- Treatment: Placement of a Word catheter, incision and drainage, marsupialization, sitz baths
- Frequency: 2% of women

A Bartholin's cyst occurs when a Bartholin's gland within the labia becomes blocked. Small cysts may result in minimal or no symptoms. Larger cysts may result in swelling on one side of the vaginal opening, as well as pain during sex or walking. If the cyst becomes infected, an abscess can occur, which is typically red and very painful. If there are no symptoms, no treatment is needed. Bartholin's cysts affect about 2% of women at some point in their life. They most commonly occur during childbearing years.

When the cyst becomes uncomfortable or painful, drainage is recommended. The preferred method is the insertion of a Word catheter for four weeks, as recurrence following simple incision and drainage is common. A surgical procedure known as marsupialization may be used or, if the problems persist, the entire gland may be removed. Removal is sometimes recommended in those older than 40 to ensure cancer is not present. Antibiotics are not generally needed to treat a Bartholin's cyst.

The cause of a Bartholin's cyst is unknown. An abscess results from a bacterial infection, but it is not usually a sexually transmitted infection (STI). Rarely, gonorrhea may be involved. Diagnosis is typically based on symptoms and examination. In women over the age of 40, a tissue biopsy is often recommended to rule out cancer.

The cyst is named after Caspar Bartholin who accurately described the glands in 1677. The underlying mechanism of the cyst was determined in 1967 by the obstetrician Samuel Buford Word.

== Signs and symptoms ==
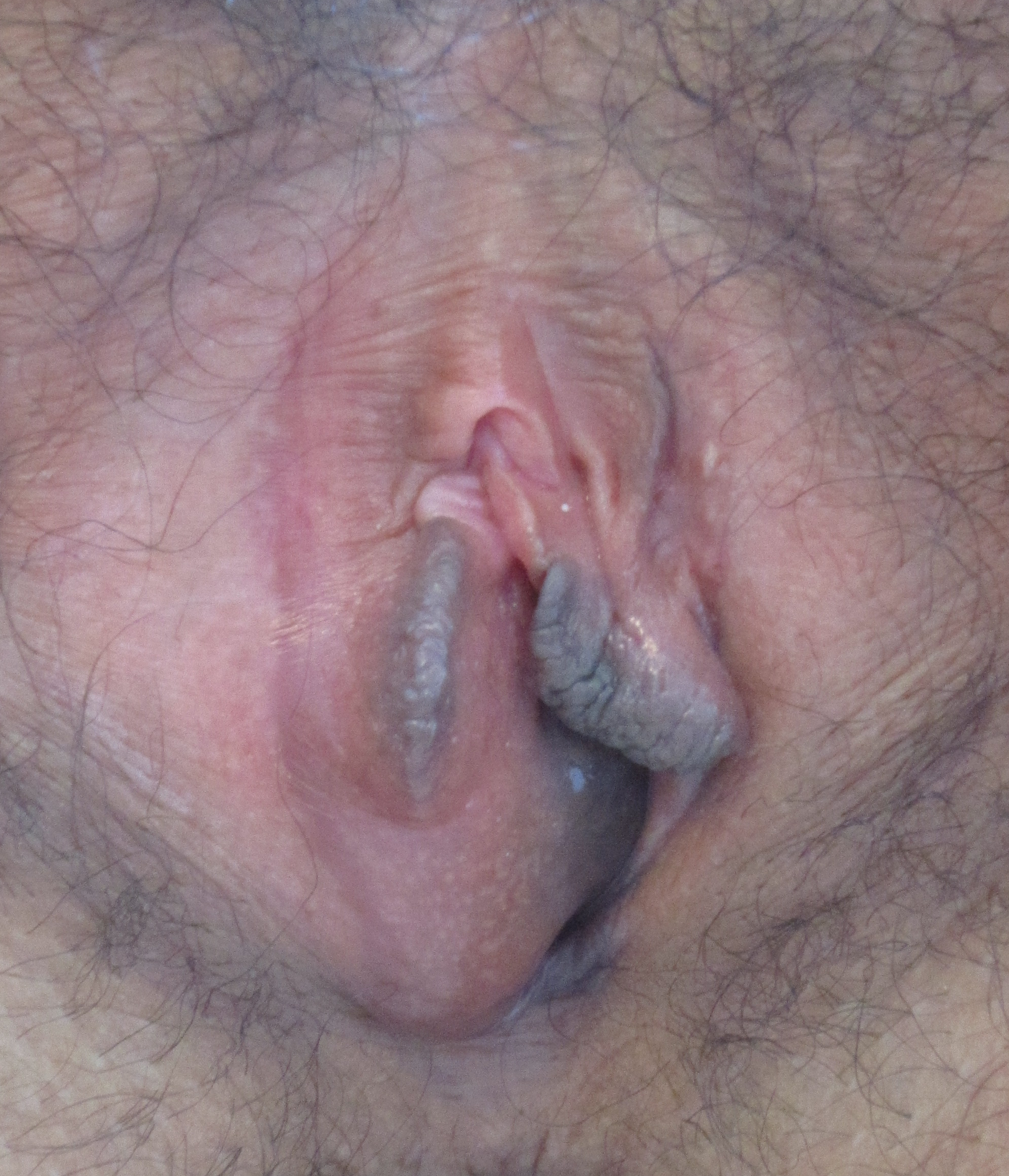
A picture of a Bartholin's cyst

Most Bartholin's cysts do not cause any symptoms, although some may cause pain during walking, sitting, or sexual intercourse (dyspareunia).

== Pathophysiology ==
A Bartholin's gland cyst develops when the duct that drains the gland becomes blocked. Blockage may be caused by an infection or a mucus plug. The secretions from the Bartholin's gland are retained, forming a cyst.

== Diagnosis ==
Other conditions that may present similarly include hidradenoma papilliferum, lipomas, epidermoid cysts and Skene's duct cysts. In women who are more than 40 years old, a biopsy may be recommended to rule out cancer.

== Treatment ==
If the Bartholin's cyst is not painful or uncomfortable, treatment may not be necessary. Small, asymptomatic cysts can be observed over time to assess their development. Sitz baths may be useful in draining minor cysts. This is a conservative treatment that involves soaking the vaginal area in a few inches of warm water. It is generally recommended to do this for ten minutes at a time, up to four times per day. This treatment can sometimes cause cysts to spontaneously drain without further intervention.

In cases that require intervention, a catheter may be placed to drain the cyst, or the cyst may be surgically opened to create a permanent pouch (marsupialization). Intervention has a success rate of 85%, regardless of the method used, to alleviate swelling and discomfort.

Catheterization is a minor procedure that can be performed locally as an outpatient procedure. A small tube with a balloon on the end (known as a Word catheter) may be inserted into the cyst. The balloon is then inflated to keep it in place. A sample of purulent discharge can be sent to a lab for culturing and a biopsy may also be done. The catheter stays in place for 2 to 4 weeks so the fluid can drain and allows a normal gland opening to form (after which the catheter is removed). The catheters do not generally impede normal activity, but sexual intercourse is generally abstained from while the catheter is in place. Catheterization may be performed multiple times if recurrence occurs. At this point, antibiotics will typically be given in addition to the catheter. Some commonly prescribed antibiotics include doxycycline, azithromycin, ciprofloxacin, and trimethoprim/sulfamethoxazole, among many others. These antibiotics are chosen to ensure coverage of the most common bacterial pathogens such as staphylococcus (including methicillin-resistant Staphylococcus aureus), streptococcus, and Escherichia coli. Catheterization cannot be performed in individuals with a latex allergy as the catheter used is made of latex.

Cysts may also be opened permanently, a procedure called marsupialization. This involves opening the gland through an incision to ensure that the secretion channel remains open. If a cyst is infected, it may break open and start to heal on its own after 3 to 4 days. Non-prescription pain medication such as ibuprofen relieves pain, and a sitz bath may increase comfort and reduce pain. Warm compresses can also speed up healing. If a Bartholin gland abscess comes back several times, the gland and duct can be surgically removed.

Bartholin's cysts can be treated in the same way for pregnant women as for non-pregnant women. The only treatment that should be used with caution in pregnant women is Bartholin gland excision (surgical removal of the gland). This is due to the increased risk for bleeding.

== Prognosis ==
While Bartholin cysts can be quite painful, they are not life-threatening. New cysts cannot absolutely be prevented from forming, but surgical or laser removal of a cyst makes it less likely that a new one will form at the same site. Those with a cyst are more likely than those without a cyst to get one in the future. They can recur every few years or more frequently.

A randomized control trial (the WoMan trial) was performed in the Netherlands and England from 2010 to 2014. Women with Bartholin's cysts were randomly assigned to receive treatment via Word catheter or marsupialization to compare the rate of recurrence over a 1-year period. This trial found that recurrence rates were quite similar between the two treatments. Recurrence occurred in 12% of women in the catheter group and 10% of women in the marsupialization group. They did find that the frequency of use of analgesics was greater in the marsupialization group than the catheter group.

== Epidemiology ==
Two percent of women will have a Bartholin's gland cyst at some point in their lives. They occur at a rate of 0.55 per 1000 person-years and in women aged 35–50 years at a rate of 1.21 per 1000 person-years. The incidence of Bartholin duct cysts increases with age until menopause, and decreases thereafter. Hispanic women may be more often affected than white women and black women. The risk of developing a Bartholin's gland cyst increases with the number of childbirths.
