= Johannes Walaeus =

Dutch physician and anatomist (1604–1649)

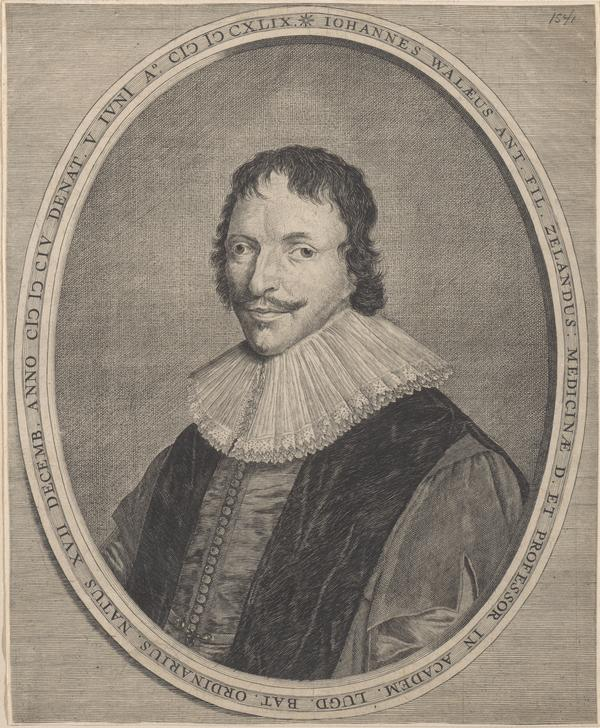
- Johannes Walaeus (1604–1649)
- Born: 27 December 1604; Koudekerke, Walcheren, Dutch Republic
- Died: 1649 (aged 44–45); Leiden, Dutch Republic
- Education: Leiden University (M.D., 1631)
- Scientific career
- Fields: Medicine
- Institutions: University of Leiden
- Doctoral advisor: Otto Heurnius
- Notable students: Thomas Bartholin

Johannes Walaeus (born Jan de Wale; also known as Johannes de Wale; 1604–1649) was a Dutch physician and illustrious professor at the Faculty of Medicine in Leiden University. He was graduated Doctor of Medicine in 1631, when he defended his dissertation, entitled Disputiatio medica de febribus at Leiden University. Two years after that, he was nominated Professor extraordinarius. In 1648, he was offered full professorship at Leiden University. Johannes Walaeus was a son of the theologian Antonius Walaeus.

== Publications ==
- Walaeus, Johannes (1677). Iohannis Walaei Epistulae duae: De motu chyli, et sanguinis
