= Word catheter =

The Word catheter is a type of balloon that is placed in the Bartholin gland cyst after incision and drainage to allow continued drainage and re-epithelialization of a tract for future drainage. The stem of the Word catheter is latex. It is named for Samuel Buford Word.
