= Thomas Fincke =

Danish mathematician and physicist (1561–1656)

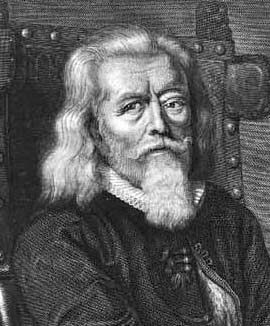
Thomas Fincke.

Thomas Fincke (6 January 1561 – 24 April 1656) was a Danish mathematician and physicist, and a professor at the University of Copenhagen for more than 60 years.

== Biography ==
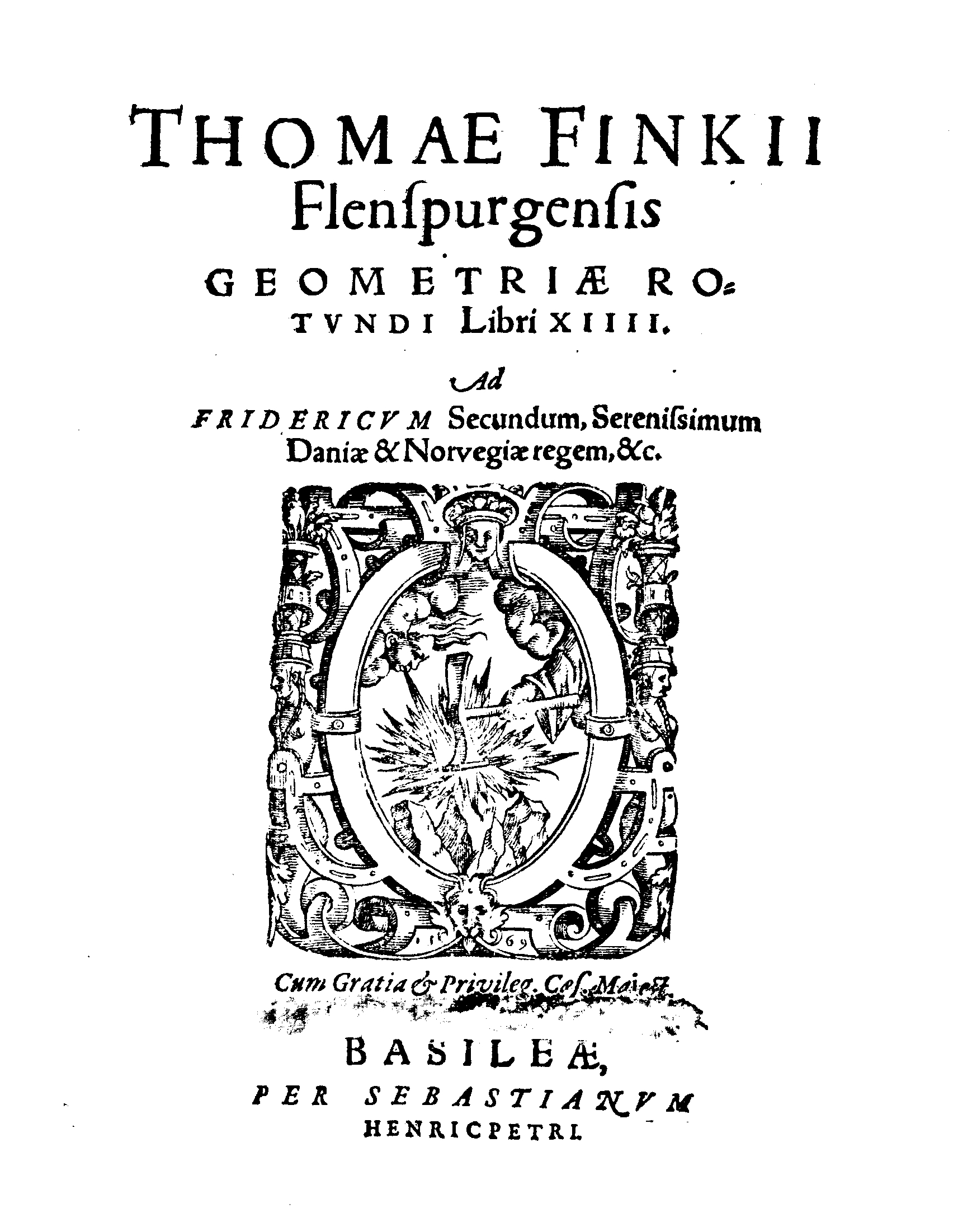
Geometriae rotundi libri XIIII, 1583

Thomas Jacobsen Fincke was born in Flensburg in Schleswig. Fincke was the son of Councillor Jacob Fincke and Anna Thorsmede. He completed his primary schooling at Flensburg. From 1577, he studied mathematics, rhetoric and other philosophical studies for five years at the University of Strasbourg.

Fincke's lasting achievement is found in his book Geometria rotundi (1583), in which he introduced the modern names of the trigonometric functions tangent and secant. In 1590, he became professor of mathematics at the University of Copenhagen. In 1603 he also obtained a professorship in medicine.

== Personal life ==
He was married to Ivaria Jungesdatter Ivers (1574–1614). His son Jacob Fincke (1592–1663) was a professor of physics. His daughters married scientist Caspar Bartholin the Elder (1585–1629), botanist Jørgen Fuiren (1581–1628), historian Ole Worm (1588–1654) and theologian Hans Brochmand (1594–1630).

Fincke died at Copenhagen and was buried at Vor Frue Kirke.
