= Fossa of vestibule of vagina =

Human anatomical feature

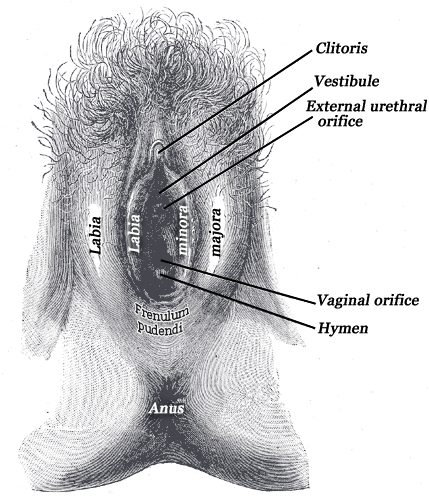
- External genital organs of female. The labia minora have been drawn apart.

Details

Identifiers
- Latin: fossa vestibuli vaginae, fossa navicularis vestibuli vaginae

The fossa of vestibule of vagina (or fossa navicularis) is a boat-shaped depression between the vaginal opening/hymen and the frenulum labiorum pudendi within the vestibule. The small openings of the Bartholin's ducts can be seen in the grooves between the hymen and the labia minora, on either side.

== Additional images ==
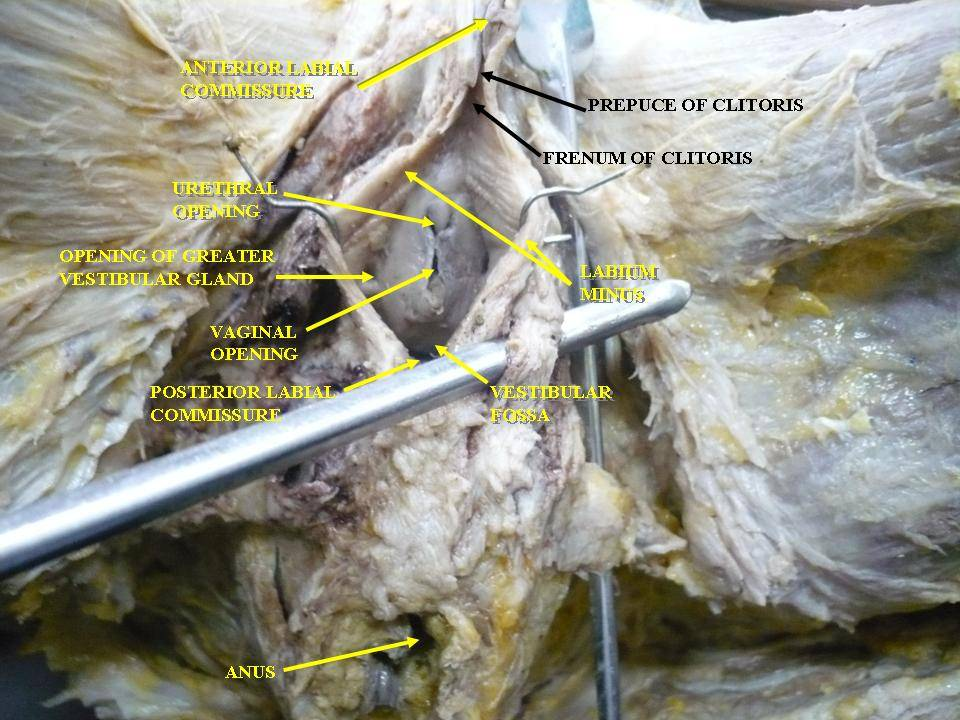
Fossa of vestibule of vagina. Deep dissection.
