= Caspar Bartholin the Younger =

Danish anatomist (1655–1738)

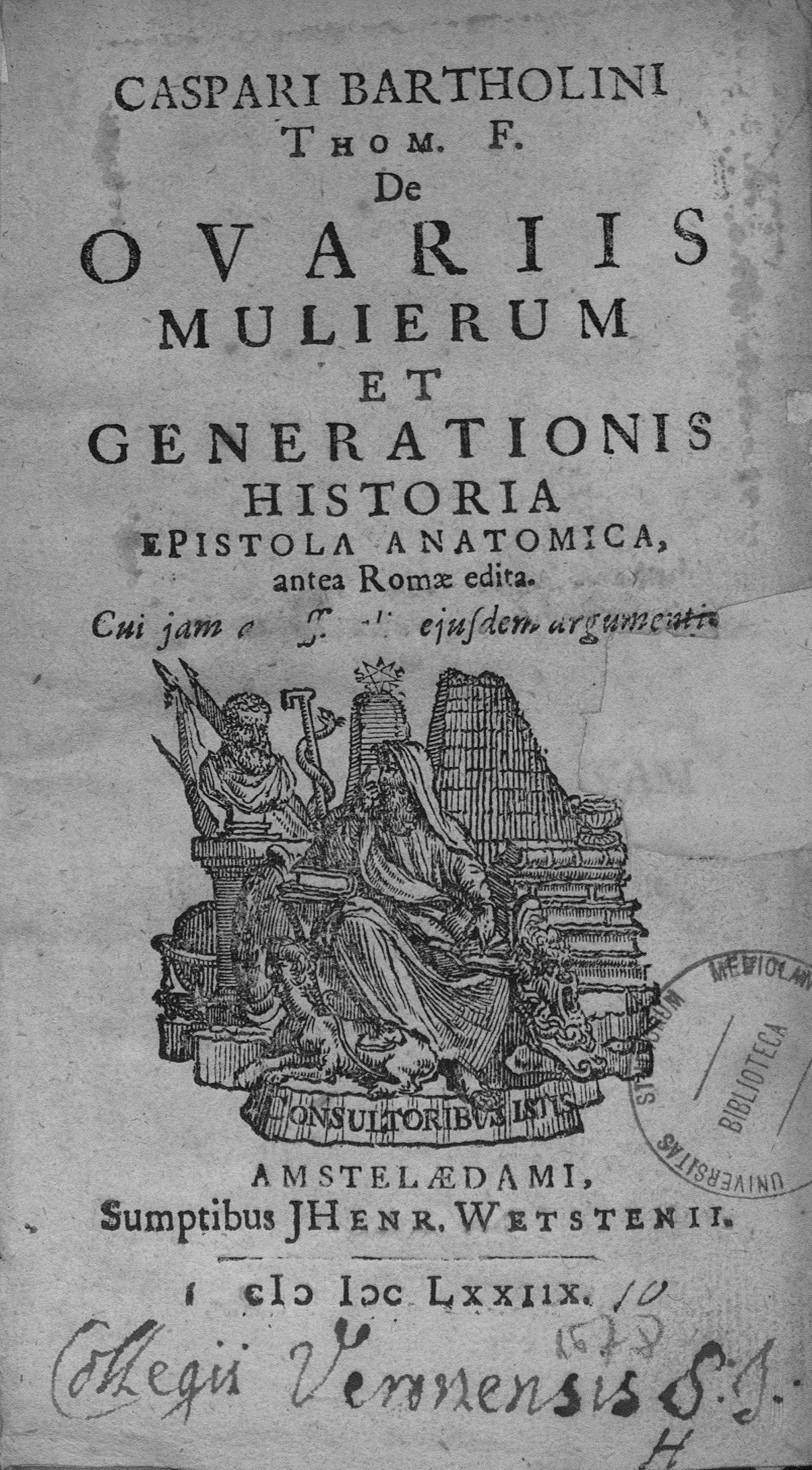
De ovariis mulierum et generationis historia epistola anatomica, 1678

Caspar Bartholin the Younger (/bɑːrˈtoʊlɪn, ˈbɑːrtəlɪn/; Latinized: Caspar Bartholin Secundus; 10 September 1655 – 11 June 1738), was a Danish anatomist who first described the "Bartholin's gland" in the 17th century. The discovery of the Bartholin's gland is sometimes mistakenly credited to his grandfather.

== Early life and education ==
Bartholin was born in Copenhagen, Denmark. He came from an eminent family. He was the grandson of theologian and anatomist Caspar Bartholin the Elder (1585–1629) and son of physician, mathematician, and theologian Thomas Bartholin (1616–1680). His uncle was a scientist and physician Rasmus Bartholin (1625–1698).

== Academic career ==
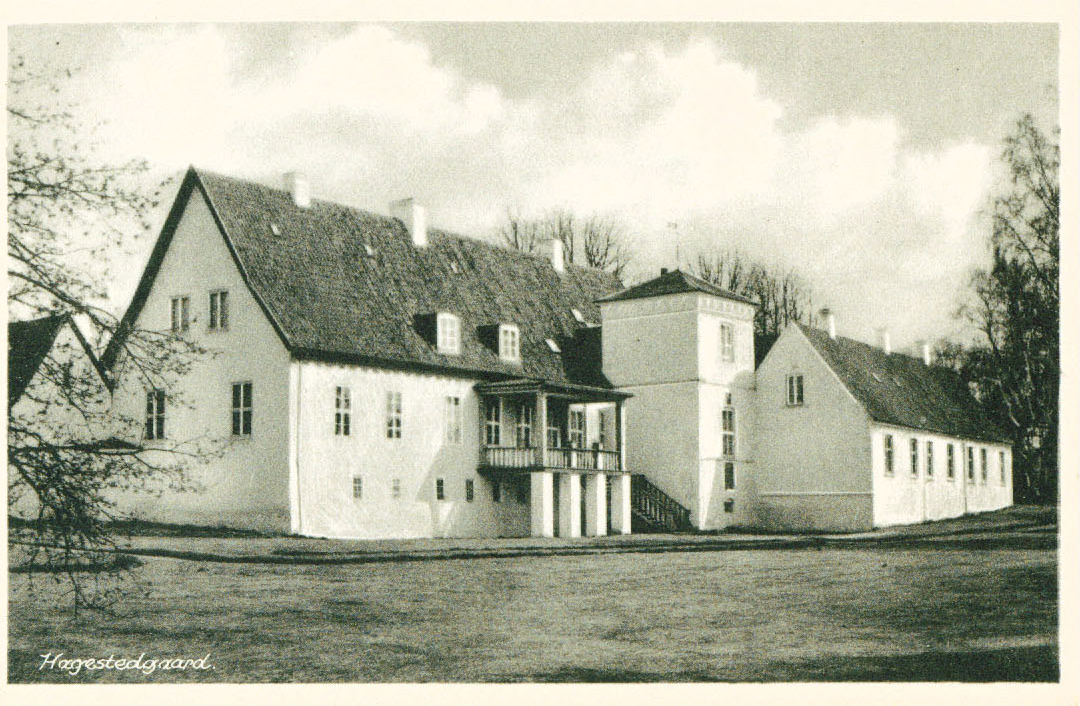
Hagestedgaard (c. 1900)

Bartholin started his medical studies in 1671 at the age of 16. From 1674, he studied in the Netherlands, France and Italy. When he returned to Denmark in 1677, he was appointed lecturer of natural philosophy at the University of Copenhagen. The following year he gained his medical degree and was made full professor at the University of Copenhagen. He described the Bartholin glands which bear his name in 1677. He was rector of the University of Copenhagen from 1687 to 1688.

In 1690, he left his academic career to become a high court judge, becoming Procurator General in 1719, and Deputy of Finance in 1724. In about 1696, Danish-born French anatomist Jacob B. Winslow (1669–1760) was Bartholin's prosector. He received the Order of the Dannebrog in 1729.

== Hagestedgård ==
Bartholin inherited the Hagestedgård manor house and estate at Holbæk from his father in 1680. He sold the estate to Laurits Jacobsen in 1686 but reacquired it in 1695. He then sold it, for a second time, to Ursula von Putbus in 1704.

== Works ==
- De tibiis veterum et earum antiquo usu, p. PP7, at Google Books. Rome: B. Carrara, 1677 (Bartholin also wrote about music)
- De ovariis mulierum et generationis historia epistola anatomica, p. PA1, at Google Books. Amsterdam: J. H. Wetstein, 1678
