= Caspar Bartholin the Elder =

Danish physician, scientist, and theologian (1585–1629)

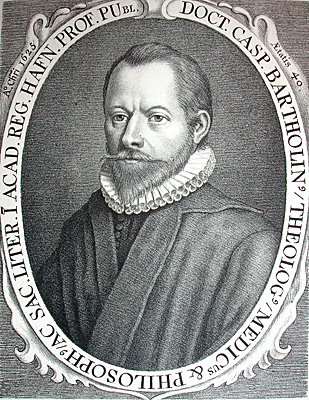
Caspar Berthelsen Bartholin

Caspar Bartholin the Elder (/bɑːrˈtoʊlɪn, ˈbɑːrtəlɪn/; 12 February 1585 – 13 July 1629) was a Danish physician, scientist and theologian.

== Biography ==
Caspar Berthelsen Bartholin was born in Malmø, Denmark (modern Sweden). His precocity was extraordinary; at three years of age he was able to read, and in his thirteenth year he composed Greek and Latin orations and delivered them in public. When he was about eighteen, he went to the University of Copenhagen and afterwards studied at Rostock and Wittenberg.

Bartholin then travelled through Germany, the Netherlands, England, France and Italy, and was received with marked respect at the different universities he visited. In 1613, he was chosen professor of medicine in the University of Copenhagen and filled that office for eleven years, when, falling into a dangerous illness, he made a vow that if he should recover he would apply himself solely to the study of divinity. He later taught theology at the university and was a canon of Roskilde.

His work, Anatomicae Institutiones Corporis Humani (1611) was for many years a standard textbook on the subject of anatomy. He was the first to describe the workings of the olfactory nerve.

== Personal life ==
Bartholin was married to Anna Fincke, daughter of the mathematician Thomas Fincke. His sons, Bertel Bartholin (1614–1690), Thomas Bartholin (1616–1680) and Rasmus Bartholin (1625–1698) were also scholars. His grandson Caspar Bartholin the Younger (1655–1738) was an anatomist. He died on 13 July 1629 at Sorø in Zealand.

== Works ==
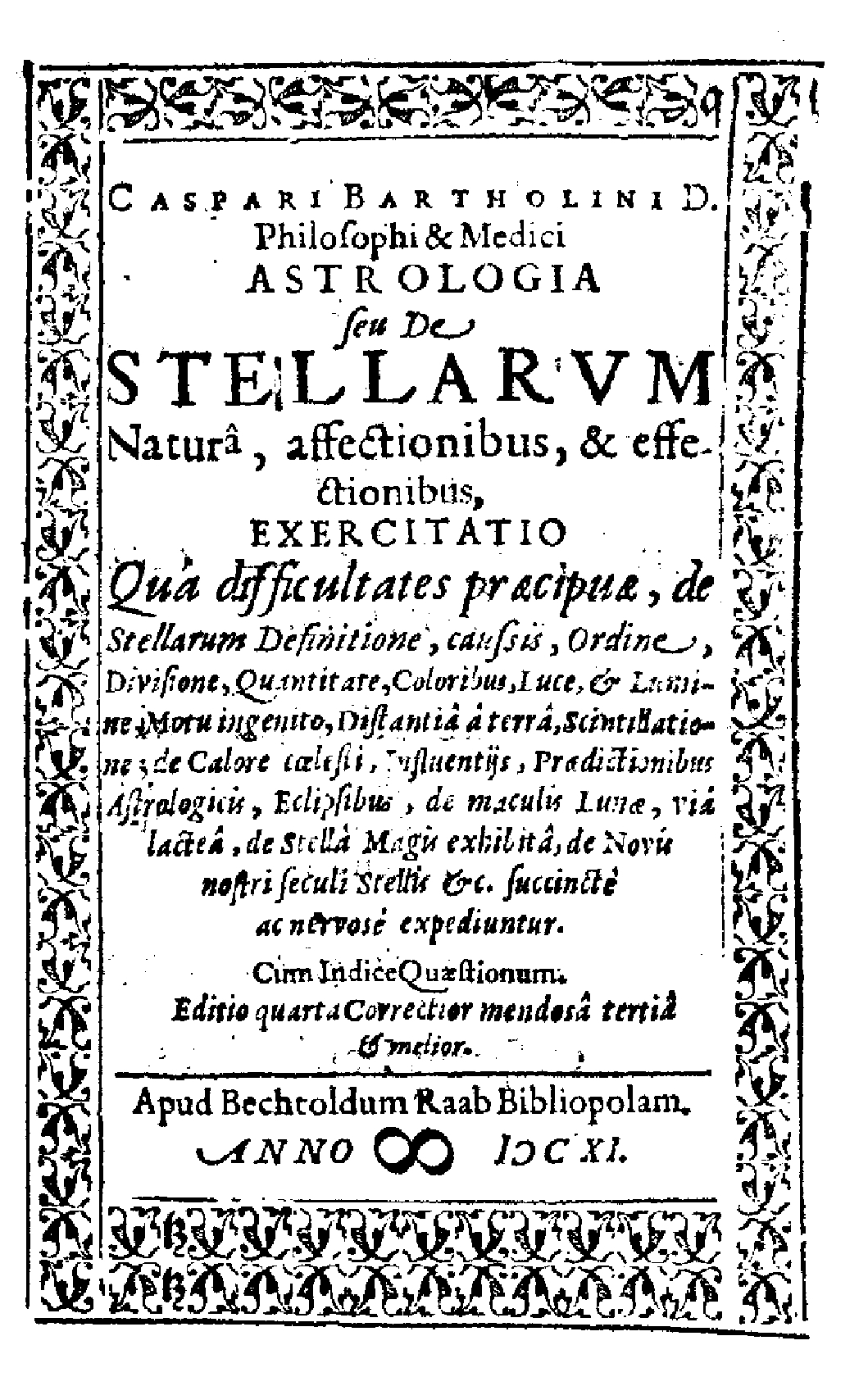
Astrologia, seu De stellarum natura, 1612

- Anatomicae Institutiones Corporis Humani (1611)
- Astrologia, seu De stellarum natura (in Latin). Wittenberg: Bechtoldus Raaben. 1612.
