= Vulvar vestibulitis =

Medical condition

Vestibulodynia (previously known as vulvar vestibulitis syndrome (VVS) or simply vulvar vestibulitis) is vulvodynia (chronic pain of the vulva) localized to the vulvar vestibule (the part of the vulva behind the labia minora, where the vagina and urethra open). It tends to be associated with a highly localized "burning" or "cutting" type of pain. The previous term, "vulvar vestibulitis," was misleading: the suffix "-itis" would normally imply inflammation, but there is little evidence to support an inflammatory process in the condition. "Vestibulodynia" is the term now recognized by the International Society for the Study of Vulvovaginal Disease, the International Society for the Study of Women's Sexual Health, and the International Pelvic Pain Society. The term is also used by the International Society for Sexual Medicine and the American College of Obstetricians and Gynecologists (ACOG).

Provoked vestibulodynia (pain provoked by contact localized to the vulvar vestibule) is the most common subtype of vulvodynia among premenopausal women. The condition has been cited as affecting about 10% to 15% of women seeking gynecological care.

== Symptoms ==
Vestibulodynia is characterized by severe pain with attempted penetration of the vaginal orifice and reports of tenderness with pressure within the vulval vestibule. Usually there are no reports of pain with pressure to other surrounding areas of the vulva. The feelings of irritation and burning can persist for hours or days following sexual activity. Vestibulodynia also can often cause sex to be painful, known as dyspareunia.

The pain may be provoked by touch or contact with an object, such as the insertion of a tampon, with vaginal intercourse, or with the pressure from sitting on a bicycle seat, (provoked vestibulodynia) or it may be constant and not provoked by a physical stimulus (unprovoked vestibulodynia). Some women have had pain since their first penetration (primary vestibulodynia) while some have had it after a period of time with pain-free penetration (secondary vestibulodynia).

The disease may have social and psychological ramifications. Many people with vulvovaginal pain experience chronic frustration, disappointment, hopelessness and depression because of the impacts that the disease has on their lives. It can negatively impact a person's quality of life, their romantic and sexual relationships, and their ability to participate in normal activities.

== Causes ==
The mechanisms underlying vestibulodynia are not yet fully understood. There are thought to be several subtypes.

Neuroproliferative vestibulodynia is a disease where in there are an excess of pain receptors (C-afferent nociceptors) and mast cells in the vestibule. There can be around 10 times the normal density of these pain receptors. Some people are born with this condition (congenital neuroproliferative vestibulodynia). Many of those born with congenital neuroproliferative vestibulodynia also experience hypersensitivity in their belly-button because both the vulvar vestibule and the belly-button develop from the same tissue in embryo (primitive urogenital sinus).

Others develop neuroproliferation later in life (acquired neuroproliferative vestibulodynia), perhaps as part of an immune response to infection or allergy. A number of causes may be involved, including subclinical human papillomavirus infection, chronic recurrent candidiasis, or chronic recurrent bacterial vaginosis.

Vestibulodynia can also be mediated by hormonal imbalances (hormonally-mediated vestibulodynia), and sometimes caused by hormonal contraceptives. Estrogen-based birth control has been shown to increase the risk of vestibulodynia by up to 11 times. Labs may show high sex hormone binding globulin or low free testosterone.

Hypertonic pelvic floor dysfunction is present in many people who have vestibulodynia. Tight muscles can even contribute to and cause pain in the posterior area of the vestibule. People with hypertonic pelvic floor dysfunction may experience urinary symptoms like urgency and/or symptoms like constipation, rectal fissures, hip pain, and/or lower back pain.

Pain extending outside of the vulvar vestibule may have other sources. Damage to the pudendal nerve ("pudendal neuralgia" or pudendal nerve entrapment) can cause unilateral or bilateral pain. Persistent genital arousal disorder can also cause pain in the vulvar vestibule. Spinal pathology can also cause vulvar pain.

In recent years, diagnostic algorithms for the diagnosis of the various sub-types of vulvodynia have been developed and refined. The International Society for the Study of Women's Sexual Health (ISSWSH) supports this diagnostic algorithm.

== Diagnosis ==
For many people with vulvodynia, getting diagnosed and treated is very difficult. Getting an accurate diagnosis often takes years. A 2012 survey found that less the 2% of people who sought care for symptoms of vulvar pain were able to get a diagnosis.

Diagnosis is made by the q-tip cotton-swab test, in which pressure is applied in a circular fashion around the vulvar vestibule to assess complaints of pain. Laboratory tests are used to exclude bacterial, viral or yeast infection. Laboratory tests can also be used to check the patient's sex hormones to see if there may be a hormonal component. A careful examination of the vulvovaginal area is conducted to assess whether any atrophy is present.

== Treatment ==
Treatment depends on the subtype of disease.

For congenital neuroproliferative vestibulodynia, the gold-standard treatment is a surgery to remove the vestibule, called vestibulectomy. Acquired neuroproliferative vestibulodynia and inflammatory vestibulodynia may be treated with topicals. When such conservative treatments fail, vestibulectomy may be an option.

Hormonally-mediated vestibulodynia is treated by stopping offending medications (commonly, hormonal birth control) and applying topical estradiol combined with topical testosterone. This allows the vulvar tissue to return to a healthy state.

Pelvic floor dysfunction is often treated with pelvic floor physical therapy. However, if symptoms persist or fail to improve after 4–8 sessions (depending on individual case), patients should consider consulting providers beyond the fields of gynecology and urology. PFPT should not exacerbate symptoms to the point of disability. A range of conditions that may contribute to or cause pelvic floor dysfunction are frequently overlooked, including (but not limited to) venous disorders, hypermobility syndromes, rib abnormalities, hip conditions (such as hip dysplasia, femoroacetabular impingement, and labral tears), and sacroiliac (SI) joint dysfunction. Each of these conditions requires specialized evaluation and management by knowledgeable providers.

Treatment typically requires a multidisciplinary team including a gynecologist, a pelvic floor physical therapist, sometimes a surgeon, and sometimes a counsellor to help patients navigate the psychosocial burdens of the condition.
