= Vulvodynia =

Chronic pain syndrome of the vulvar area

- Specialty: Gynecology Pain Medicine Dermatology

Vulvodynia is a chronic pain condition that affects the vulvar area and occurs without an identifiable cause. Symptoms typically include a feeling of burning or irritation. It has been established by the ISSVD that for the diagnosis to be made symptoms must last at least three months.

== Cause and diagnosis ==
It is likely there are multiple factors that contribute to the manifestation of vulvodynia, although often no identifiable trigger event can be found.

Clinicians generally agree that vulvodynia is an 'umbrella' diagnosis encompassing many sub-types with different causes, including an excess of nerve fibers, hormonal imbalances, inflammation, and muscular dysfunction.

Of note, one common precipitating event is a severe yeast infection, to quote the British Association of Dermatologists: "Secondary [acquired] vulvodynia may follow inflammation in the vulva, such as that caused by thrush or the overuse of topical and vaginal anti-thrush treatments." This is corroborated by the UK's Vulval Pain Society: "Some women have a sudden onset of symptoms following a specific event: a commonly recognised event is a severe attack of thrush followed by anti-thrush treatment. Once the attack of thrush settles following treatment, soreness and burning may persist as vestibulodynia." Research on mice models has found that giving females repeated thrush infections leads to chronic pain of their vulva. In When Sex Hurts, one of the leading books on vulvodynia written by notable researchers in the field, Dr Andrew Goldstein and Irwin Goldstein, the authors write: "We can't tell you how many women tell us that their vulvar pain began after a yeast infection or a series of them."

Some factors influencing the disease may include genetics, immunology, and possibly diet. Of note, women with genes coding for stronger inflammatory responses are thought to be of increased risk of developing vulvodynia. Diagnosis is by ruling out other possible causes and performing a Q-tip test. This may or may not include a biopsy of the area.

== Treatment and epidemiology ==
Treatment may involve a number of different measures; however, as vulvodynia has many sub-types, none is universally effective, and the evidence to support their effectiveness is often poor. Some of these measures include medications, pelvic floor physical therapy, surgery, and counselling. Vulvodynia is estimated to affect up to 10-28% of women.

== Signs and symptoms ==
Pain is the most notable symptom of vulvodynia, and can be characterized as a burning, stinging, irritation or sharp pain that occurs in the vulva and entrance to the vagina. It may be constant, intermittent or happen only when the vulva is touched, but vulvodynia usually has a long duration.

Symptoms may occur in one place ("localized") or the entire vulvar area ("generalized"). It can occur during or after sexual activity, when tampons are inserted, or when prolonged pressure is applied to the vulva, such as during sitting, bike riding, or horseback riding. The pain can be provoked by touch ("provoked") or constant ("unprovoked"). Some cases of vulvodynia are idiopathic where no specific cause can be determined.

=== Vestibulodynia ===
Vestibulodynia, formerly known as vulvar vestibulitis syndrome (VVS), or simply vulvar vestibulitis, refers to pain localized to the vestibular region. It tends to be associated with a highly localized "burning" or "cutting" type of pain.

Vestibulodynia is the most common subtype of vulvodynia that affects premenopausal women – the syndrome has been cited as affecting about 10%–15% of women seeking gynecological care.

=== Clitorodynia ===
The pain of vulvodynia may extend into the clitoris; this is referred to as clitorodynia. Clitorodynia may be sometimes caused by clitoris adhesions, a condition where the hood of the clitoris becomes stuck to the clitoris itself. Symptoms may include pain, hypersensitivity, hyposensitivity, difficulty with arousal, muted or absent orgasm. Clitoral adhesions are common among female patients with lichen sclerosus, but also occur among the general population. The prevalence of clitoral adhesions is unknown. Clitorodynia has been neglected in medical research and under-recognized in clincical practice.

== Causes ==
Vulvodynia has many different sub-types and causes. The disease is highly idiopathic. Identifying the cause is important to determine the appropriate treatment.

Pain confined to the vulval vestibule, known as vestibulodynia, has at least three known sub-types: neuroproliferation, hormonally-mediation, and inflammation. Neuroproliferation can be present from birth or acquired later in life. This type of vestibulodynia is known as neuroproliferative vestibulodynia. Hormonally-mediated vestibulodynia can be caused by hormonal medications like oral birth control. Inflammatory vestibulodynia can develop as part of an immune response.

Other possible causes include Sjögren syndrome, the symptoms of which include chronic vaginal dryness. Others include genetic predisposition to inflammation, allergy or other sensitivity (for example: oxalates in the urine), an autoimmune disorder similar to lupus erythematosus or to eczema or to lichen sclerosus, infection (e.g., yeast infections, bacterial vaginosis, HPV, HSV), injury, and neuropathy—including an increased number of nerve endings in the vaginal area. Some cases seem to be negative outcomes of genital surgery, such as a labioplasty. Initiation of hormonal contraceptives that contain low- dose estrogen before the age of 16 could predispose women to vulvar vestibulitis syndrome. A significantly lower pain threshold, especially in the posterior vestibulum, has also been associated with the use of hormonal contraceptives in women without vulvar vestibulitis syndrome. Pelvic floor dysfunction may be the underlying cause of some women's pain.

Many co-morbidities are commonly associated with vulvodynia, including fibromyalgia, irritable bowel syndrome, interstitial cystitis, pelvic floor dysfunction, endometriosis, depression and anxiety disorders.

== Diagnosis ==
The condition is one of exclusion and other vulvovaginal problems should be ruled out. The diagnosis is based on the typical complaints of the patient, essentially normal physical findings, and the absence of identifiable causes per the differential diagnosis. Cotton swab testing is used to differentiate between generalized and localized pain and delineate the areas of pain and categorize their severity. Patients often will describe the touch of a cotton ball as extremely painful, like the scraping of a knife. A diagram of pain locations may be helpful in assessing the pain over time. The vagina should be examined, and tests, including wet mount, vaginal pH, fungal culture, and Gram stain, should be performed as indicated. Fungal culture may identify resistant strains.

Surveys have estimated that only about half of the women who meet the criteria for vulvodynia will seek medical help. Many will see several doctors before a correct diagnosis is made. Less than 2% of the people who seek help obtain a diagnosis. Many gynecologists are not familiar with this family of conditions. Affected women are also often hesitant to seek treatment for chronic vulvar pain, especially since many women begin experiencing symptoms around the same time they become sexually active. Moreover, the absence of any visible symptoms means that before being successfully diagnosed many patients have been told that the pain is "in their head". The misattribution of women's vulvo-vaginal pain to a psychological origin rather than a medical one is traceable back to the influence of Freudian psychoanalysis.

=== Differential diagnosis ===
1. Infections: urinary tract infection, candidiasis, herpes, HPV, vaginitis
2. Dermetological diseases: lichen sclerosus, lichen planus
3. Neoplasm: Paget's disease, vulvar carcinoma
4. Neurologic disorder: neuralgia secondary to herpes virus, spinal nerve injury, pudendal nerve entrapment

In recent years, diagnostic algorithms for the diagnosis of the various sub-types of and causes of vulvar pain have been developed and refined. The International Society for the Study of Women's Sexual Health (ISSWSH) supports this diagnostic algorithm.

== Treatment ==
There are a number of possible treatments with none being uniformly effective. Treatments include:

=== Medications ===
A number of medications have been used to treat vulvodynia. Evidence to support their use, however, is often poor. These include creams and ointments containing lidocaine, estrogen or tricyclic antidepressants. Antidepressants and anticonvulsants in pill form are sometimes tried but have been poorly studied. Injectable medications included steroids and botulinum toxin have been tried with limited success.

=== Physical therapy ===
Many patients who have vulvodynia also have high-tone pelvic floor, meaning that their pelvic floor muscles are too tight. This may contribute to their pain in the area. Pelvic floor physical therapy may help treat the pelvic floor dysfunction and help the patient gain greater control over their pelvic floor muscles.

=== Surgery ===
Vestibulectomy is a surgery to remove the vulval vestibule, and it may be recommended for certain patients. It has been suggested as a first-line treatment for neuroproliferative vestibulodynia. It has successful long-term outcomes, but is often only offered after conservative measures have failed.

=== Spinal cord stimulation ===
Used in cases of spontaneous (unprovoked) pain, this form of neuromodulation aims to distract the nervous system from pain signals as they travel up the dorsal root ganglion to the brain. Pelvic pain neuromodulation specialists are able to perform this surgery, although evidence for this treatment is limited largely to case studies.

=== Lifestyle ===
A number of lifestyle changes are often recommended, such as using cotton underwear, not using substances that may irritate the area, and using lubricant during sex. The use of alternative medicine has not been sufficiently studied to make recommendations.

=== Counseling ===
Gynaecologist-led educational seminars delivered in a group format have a significant positive impact on psychological symptoms and sexual functioning in women who have provoked (caused by a stimulus such as touch or sexual activity) vestibulodynia (pain localized in the vulvar vestibule).

== Epidemiology ==
The percentage of women affected is not entirely clear, but estimates range between 10-28%. Many other conditions that are not truly vulvodynia (diagnosis is made by ruling out other causes of vulvar pain) could be confused with it. Vulvar pain is a quite frequent complaint in women's health clinics.

== Patient communities ==
Given the difficulty of getting diagnosed and treated for vulvodynia, patients have formed communities to help each other access healthcare and to advocate for better recognition of the disease.

Founded in 1994, the National Vulvodynia Association (NVA) is a non-profit organization in the United States that helps connect patients to each other and to medical providers who can help them. The NVA maintains a healthcare provider referral list and has geographically-organized patient support groups. The NVA secured the first funding for vulvodynia research in the 1990s, and it continues to provide seed grants for research on vulvodynia.

Tight Lipped is a second, younger community of vulvodynia patients in the United States. Founded in 2019, Tight Lipped started as a story-telling podcast focused on ending the stigma and mystery surrounding vulvovaginal pain. It has evolved into a grassroots, patient-led organization devoted to changing how chronic vulvovaginal pain conditions like vulvodynia are understood by the medical community and by society.

There are several online communities of patients on sites like Facebook and Reddit. Because medical knowledge is so hard to access, patients resort to other patients' knowledge to get help.

== Educational and systemic factors ==
Despite its prevalence, Vulvodynia remains a frequently under-recognized condition within the medical community, often resulting in a prolonged diagnostic journey. Patients with this condition often experience significant diagnostic delays and undergo multiple medical consultations without achieving symptomatic improvement.

This systemic delay is primarily attributed to critical gaps in medical education. Many practicing clinicians and residency programs lack sufficient clinical exposure to the evaluation of chronic vulvovaginal pain disorders. Because Vulvodynia is fundamentally a diagnosis of exclusion, widespread unfamiliarity among frontline providers contributes to difficulties in identifying the neuropathic component of the pain.

== Clinical misattribution ==
Limited clinical awareness may contribute to repeated misdiagnosis and ineffective management. A common diagnostic error occurs when providers observe mild physiological discharge and incorrectly attribute chronic vestibular pain to recurrent vulvovaginal candidiasis. Consequently, patients are frequently subjected to repeated, ineffective regimens of topical therapies, such as imidazole antifungals and corticosteroids, which fail to address the underlying condition.

Furthermore, when empirical treatments do not provide relief, symptoms may sometimes be attributed to psychological factors or conditions such as vaginismus. This dismissal of the physical etiology of the pain not only exacerbates patient distress but further obstructs access to appropriate multidisciplinary care.
