= Vestibulectomy =

Gynecological surgical procedure

A vestibulectomy is a gynecological surgical procedure that can be used to treat vulvar pain, specifically in cases of provoked vestibulodynia. Vestibulodynia (vulvar vestibulitis) is a chronic pain syndrome that is a subtype of localized vulvodynia where chronic pain and irritation is present in the vulval vestibule, which is near the entrance of the vagina. Vestibulectomy may be partial or complete.

Vulvar vestibulectomy is primarily supported as an intervention for people who suffer from provoked vestibulodynia, which causes sexual pain to women. It is not indicated as appropriate for people living with generalized vulvar pain disorders and non-provoked vestibulodynia.

Vestibulectomy is not considered a first-line treatment option for provoked vestibulodynia, but it is considered an effective treatment for the long-run and has recorded high levels of satisfaction from the patients. One review found that significant pain relief was reported by 79% of patients.

== Procedure ==
The surgery takes place below the urinary meatus, down to the border of the perineal area and includes the fourchette. Incisions are made on each side adjacent and parallel to the labia minora. The structures removed are the hymen, mucous membrane, Bartholin glands ducts and minor vestibular glands. In some surgeries, the amount of tissue removed is not so extensive. Vaginal mucosa tissue remains attached and then is pulled downward to cover the area where tissue was removed. This surgery is also used to treat lichen sclerosus. "The complete surgery removes the entire lateral hymenal tissues to the lateral vestibular walls at Hart’s line, and involves removal of the entire posterior fourchette from the posterior hymenal remnants down to the perineum" which barring complications, enables the entire procedure to be over within an hour.

The procedure involves minimal bleeding and is usually done under spinal or general anesthesia. The amount of tissue removed during the surgery can vary with respect to the pain.

== Complications ==
Complications related to vestibulectomy include bleeding and infection. Long-term complications can be weakness of the anal muscles, cosmetic changes, development of a Bartholin's cyst, or a decline in vaginal lubrication. Reports of satisfaction with the outcome of the surgical procedure can be as high as 90%.

The procedure has been known to be unsuccessful in rare cases, where the pain remained constant even after surgery. In such cases, alternative treatments like oral medicines or more surgeries may be considered, depending on the severity of the persisting pain.

== Recovery ==
The recovery period is about 6–12 weeks, depending on the amount of vulvar tissues removed. Post-surgery, the patient might need further physical and possible mental therapy to avoid scarring and lead a regular sexual life.

== Epidemiology ==
In a study done in 2006, it was discovered that 93% of patients who had undergone the surgery recommended it for vulvar pain. Only 11% of women continued to have issues in their sex lives post-surgery.
