= Vulvar Crohn's disease =

Crohn's disease of the vulva

Crohn's disease (CD) of the vulva is a rare extra intestinal condition, with granulomatous cutaneous lesions affecting the female genitalia. Lesions connected to the affected gut via a healthy tissue are referred to as metastatic lesions.

== Presentation ==
The most common clinical manifestation of vulvar CD is unilateral labial swelling associated with chronic vulvar ulceration, along with perianal lesions which were reported in 48% of the patients.

Dermatologic inflammatory vulvo-vaginal lesions are usually caused by fistulas arising from the anus or rectum. However, not all inflammatory lesions within the genitalia are caused in fistulas fashion, even in patients with gastrointestinal Crohn's disease.

Similar clinical lesions have been reported in male genitalia affecting the penis and the scrotum.

Vulvar CD bears no typical symptoms and is only diagnosed and associated with gastrointestinal CD based on vulvar ulcers and hypertrophic lesions. Some patients do, however, report vulvar pain, pruritus, dyspareunia or dysuria.

Upon examination, at least one of 4 types of vulvar lesions can be present.

- Vulvar swelling, edema; inflammatory and asymmetrical swelling affecting both labia minora and majora or the vaginal wall. Swelling affects approximately 67% of patients with vulvar CD.
- Ulceration; may vary in numbers, size and depth from patient to patient. However, linear ulcers extending to the groin are typical for genital CD. Vulvar ulcers were present in approximately 40% of the patients.
- Hypertrophic lesions; may either affect the whole labia or be localized. Hypertrophic lesions are not inflammatory and there are no functional symptoms, and the main issue seems to be their unpleasant appearance. Their exhibition has been reported in approximately 24% of vulvar CD patients.
- Chronic suppuration; vulvar abscesses have been reported in approximately 17% of the patients.

== Course of the disease ==
The progress of vulvar CD is unpredictable; spontaneous healing has been reported, as well as cases requiring surgery or vulvectomy (i.e., partial or total removal of the vulva).

Case reports provide some insights into the progression of the disease for select numbers of individuals. For example, one case described in the Indian Journal of Dermatology noted the progression of vulvar CD for one woman over the course of a year as follows:

Swelling was progressive and initially started with small nodules of 2-3 cm diameter at the right labia majora. Within period of 6 months, it almost symmetrically involved both labia majora sparing the labia minora, clitoris and periurethral region. Gradually, within a period of 3 months, it also involved the perianal area. It was associated with mild itching.

A 2009 literature review found that, of the fifty-five cases examined in the studies reviewed, "duration of the symptoms varied from 1 to 18 months in this review." The authors note that vulvar CD's "signs and symptoms are also common to many other gynaecological conditions, making the clinical suspicion of vulva CD very difficult. This results in delayed definitive diagnoses."

== Diagnosis ==
The most reliable diagnostic tool for vulvar CD is histological analysis of biopsies. Positive diagnosis is further supported by the presence of chronic inflammatory infiltrates, epidermal ulceration, along with noncaseating tuberculoid granulomas. Proper testing should also include vaginal smear for detection of several viral species, blood cell count and serology for HIV, C-reactive protein and TPHA-VDRL. Visual investigation can also be useful in case of abscesses or fistulated lesions. Vulvar CD bears great clinical similarity to Behçet's disease.

== Management ==
The treatment of vulvar CD mostly consists of medical therapy, with only a few cases having to resort to surgery. This therapy is based on corticosteroids, the immunosuppressive effect of which is commonly used for the treatment of regular gastrointestinal CD. Corticosteroids may be administered on their own, or combined with either metronidazole or azathioprine, or both, for increased efficiency. However, direct injection or local administration of corticosteroids has been mostly unsatisfactory.

The anti-TNFα treatment has also been successful in 5 out of 6 reported cases, with infliximab being applied either alone or combined with azathioprine or methotrexate. Administration of infliximab has provided only after previous treatment with antibiotics or immunosuppressive.

Surgical approach has been conducted in a minority of cases and mostly consists of either vulvectomy, laser vaporization, lesion excision, or vulvar abscess draining. Surgical management has unfortunately been comparably more unsuccessful than medical, and should only see minimal use, except for cases not responding to medical treatment, drainage of vulvar abscesses and resection of surface lesions.
