= Vulvectomy =

Partial or complete removal of the vulva

- A 3 in 1 incision vulvectomy
- ICD-9-CM: 71.5–71.6

Vulvectomy refers to a gynecological procedure in which the vulva is partly or completely removed. The procedure is usually performed as a last resort in certain cases of cancer, vulvar dysplasia, vulvar intraepithelial neoplasia, or as part of female genital mutilation. Although there may be severe pain in the groin area after the procedure, for a number of weeks, sexual function is generally still possible but limited.

== Types ==
A simple vulvectomy can be either complete (more than 80% of the vulvar area) or partial (less than 80% of vulvar area). It removes the skin and superficial subcutaneous tissues. A radical vulvectomy is the same with regard to complete or partial, however, includes removal of skin and deep subcutaneous tissue. An inguinofemoral lymphadenectomy may be performed along with a radical vulvectomy (whether partial or complete) on one or both sides if spread of a cancer is suspected.

A partial vulvectomy of the top area of the vulva

A partial vulvectomy of one side of the vulva

A partial vulvectomy of the bottom area of the vulva

A simple partial vulvectomy is the least severe, only removing the affected portion of the vulva.

A "skinning vulvectomy" is the removal of the top layer of vulvar skin (the external female genital organs, including the clitoris, vaginal lips and the opening of the vagina). In this case skin grafts from other parts of the body may be needed to cover the area. There are two types of skinning vulvectomy, the "partial" and the "total". The objective of the first is the preservation of the cosmetic and functional integrity of the vulva in younger and sexually active patients, in whom a steady increase in the incidence of vulvar intraepithelial neoplasia has been observed in the last decade. The objective of the latter is the removal of the entire vulva with total skin graft replacement in patients with an entire vulvar cancer involvement. "Modified radical vulvectomy" involves the removal of vulva containing cancer and some of the normal tissue around it.

== See also ==
- List of surgeries by type
- Genitoplasty
