= Scrotodynia =

- Specialty: Dermatology

Scrotodynia is a condition characterized by dysesthesia of the scrotum.

== See also ==
- Vulvodynia
- List of cutaneous conditions
