= Sclerosis (medicine) =

Stiffening of a tissue or anatomical feature

- Other names: Sclerosus
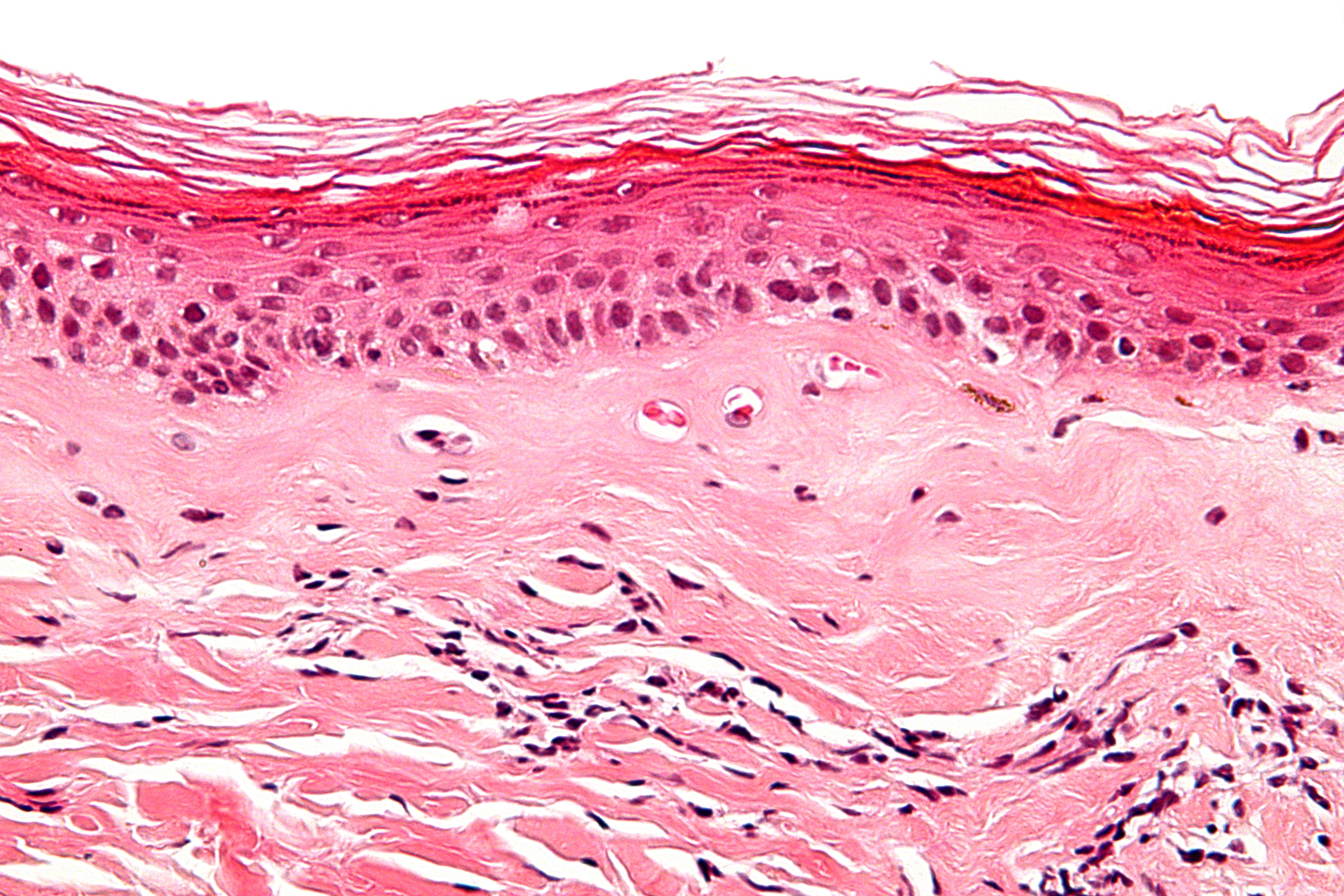
- Micrograph of subepithelial sclerosus (middle third of image) in a case of lichen sclerosus. H&E stain.

Sclerosis (from Ancient Greek σκληρός (sklērós) 'hard') is the stiffening of a tissue or anatomical feature, usually caused by a replacement of the normal organ-specific tissue with connective tissue. The structure may be said to have undergone sclerotic changes or display sclerotic lesions, which refers to the process of sclerosis.

Common medical conditions whose pathology involves sclerosis include:

- Amyotrophic lateral sclerosis—also known as Lou Gehrig's disease or motor neurone disease—a progressive, incurable, usually fatal disease of motor neurons.
- Atherosclerosis, a deposit of fatty materials, such as cholesterol, in the arteries which causes hardening.
- Focal segmental glomerulosclerosis is a disease that attacks the kidney's filtering system (glomeruli) causing serious scarring and thus a cause of nephrotic syndrome in children and adolescents, as well as an important cause of kidney failure in adults.
- Hippocampal sclerosis, a brain damage often seen in individuals with temporal lobe epilepsy.
- Lichen sclerosus, an inflammatory skin disease that most often affects the vulva and the penis.
- Multiple sclerosis, or focal sclerosis, is a central nervous system disease which affects coordination.
- Osteosclerosis, a condition where the bone density is significantly increased, resulting in decreased lucency on radiographs.
- Otosclerosis, a disease of the ears.
- Primary lateral sclerosis, progressive muscle weakness in the voluntary muscles.
- Primary sclerosing cholangitis, a hardening of the bile duct by scarring and repeated inflammation.
- Systemic sclerosis (progressive systemic scleroderma), a rare, chronic disease which affects the skin, and in some cases also blood vessels and internal organs.
- Tuberous sclerosis, a rare genetic disease which affects multiple systems.
