= International Society for the Study of Vulvovaginal Disease =

Non-profit organization

The International Society for the Study of Vulvovaginal Disease (ISSVD) is a non-profit organization that was founded in 1970 at the Sixth World Congress of the International Federation of Obstetricians and Gynecologists (FIGO) in New York City. It is composed of health care professionals from different areas, including, gynecologists, dermatologists, general practitioners, physiotherapist, nurse practitioners, etc. devoted to the study, investigation, and treatment of vulvovaginal diseases.

The ISSVD regularly promotes and develops terminology, classification, and guidelines concerning these conditions. These include, among others: vulvar dermatosis (lichen sclerosus, lichen planus), vulvar pain (vulvodynia), vulvar intraepithelial neoplasia, etc. More recently, a guideline concerning female cosmetic genital surgery was published.

== Presidents and world congresses ==
PRESIDENTS and WORLD CONGRESSES of the ISSVD
CONGRESS	LOCATION	City/Province	DATES	PRESIDENT
I	SPAIN	Marbelca	Aug. 8, 1973	Dr. Guillermo R. di Paola
II	USA	Key Biscayne	Jan. 9–11, 1975	Dr. J. Donald Woodruff
III	MEXICO	Cocoyoc	Oct. 22–24, 1976	Dr. Herman L. Gardner
IV	FRANCE	Montbazon	May 2–25, 1978	Dr. Jean Hewitt
V	USA	Maui	Oct. 21–23, 1979	Dr. Raymond H. Kaufman
VI	ENGLAND	Cambridge	Sept. 22–24, 1981	Dr. Charles P. Douglas
VII	USA	Lake Buena Vista	Sept. 25–29,1983	Dr. Eduard G. Friedrich
VIII	FINLAND	Mariehamn	Sept. 9–12, 1985	Dr. Peter J. Lynch
IX	AUSTRALIA	Queensland	Aug. 30–Sept 3, 1987	Dr. Barry L. Kneale
X	USA	Washington, DC	Oct. 22–26, 1989	Dr. Edward J. Wilkinson
XI	ENGLAND	Oxford	Sept. 22–26, 1991	Dr. C. Marjorie Ridley
XII	CANADA	Quebec	Sept. 26–30, 1993	Dr. Michel Roy
XIII	ARGENTINA	Iguazu	Sept. 17–20, 1995	Dr. Nidia Gomez Rueda
XIV	ITALY	Baveno	Sept. 14–20, 1997	Dr. Dale Brown, Jr.
XV	USA	Santa Fe, New Mexico	Sept. 26–Oct. 2, 1999	Dr. Mario Sideri
XVI	PORTUGAL	Sintra/Porto	Sept. 30–Oct. 6, 2001	Dr. Marilynne McKay
XVII	BRAZIL	Salvador	Oct. 12–16, 2003	Dr. Jose Martinez de Oliveira
XVIII	NEW ZEALAND	Queenstown	Feb. 20–24, 2006	Dr. Ronald W. Jones
XIX	ALASKA	Inside Passage Cruise	July 28– Aug. 3, 2007	Dr. Libby Edwards
XX	SCOTLAND	Edinburgh	Sept. 13–17, 2009	Dr. Allan B. MacLean
XXI	FRANCE	Paris	Sept. 5–8, 2011	Dr. Micheline Moyal-Barracco
XXII	ROYAL CARIBBEAN	Mediterranean	Oct. 6–13, 2013	Dr. Jacob Bornstein
XXIII	NEW YORK	New York	July 27–29, 2015	Dr. Hope Haefner
XXIV	ARGENTINA	Mendoza	September 11–15, 2017	Dr. Claudia Marchitelli
XXV	ITALY	Torino	September 16–20, 2019	Dr. Mario Preti
XXVI	IRELAND	Dublin	July, 15-20, 2022	Dr. Colleen K. Stockdale

== Terminology, classification, and guidelines ==
Year	Document
2005	The vulvodynia guideline
2006	2006 ISSVD classification of vulvar dermatoses: pathologic subsets and their clinical correlates
2011	2011 ISSVD Terminology and classification of vulvar dermatological disorders: an approach to clinical diagnosis
2013	2013 Vulvodynia Guideline update
2015	The 2015 International Society for the Study of Vulvovaginal Disease (ISSVD) Terminology of Vulvar Squamous Intraepithelial Lesions
2015	2015 ISSVD, ISSWSH, and IPPS Consensus Terminology and Classification of Persistent Vulvar Pain and Vulvodynia
2018	International Society for the Study of Vulvovaginal Disease Recommendations Regarding Female Cosmetic Genital Surgery
2021	The International Society for the Study of Vulvovaginal Disease Vaginal Wet Mount Microscopy Guidelines: How to Perform, Applications, and Interpretation
