= International Pelvic Pain Society =

Healthcare organization

- Formation: March 28, 1997; 29 years ago
- Type: Nonprofit organization
- Location: Burnsville, MN 55306 USA
- Members: approximately 410 (2022)
- Chairman of the Board: Georgine Lamvu, MD, MPH
- President: Erin Teeter Carey, MD
- Vice President: Diana Atashroo, MD
- Website: www.pelvicpain.org
- Formerly called: Pelvic Pain Society

The International Pelvic Pain Society is an organization of healthcare professionals whose primary mission is to disseminate educational resources for the management of chronic pelvic pain conditions. The society promotes multi-disciplinary and biopsychosocial treatment approaches, as well as research and collaboration between patients and providers. Its mission statement is:

- To promote education about interdisciplinary approaches to the evaluation and treatment of health conditions associated with chronic pelvic pain.
- To support individuals living with chronic pelvic pain by improving access to care, and supporting physical and emotional well-being.
- To raise public awareness through education, outreach and engagement and improve the lives of patients worldwide.

The society's membership consists of professionals engaged in pain management across multiple specialties including gynecology, urology, gastroenterology, physical medicine and rehabilitation, physical and occupational therapists, psychology, social work, and other health professions.

== History ==
IPPS was incorporated on March 28, 1997, as the Pelvic Pain Society, by Dr. C. Paul Perry, Dr. James Carter, and Dr. Fred M. Howard. The original mission statement of the Society in 1997 was:

- To educate health care professionals how to diagnosis and manage chronic pelvic pain, thereby changing the lives of patients worldwide.
- To bring hope to persons who suffer from chronic pelvic pain by significantly raising public awareness and impacting individual lives.

In 2002 the Board of Directors updated the mission statement to include the diagnosis of and treatment of male pelvic pain, and in 2019 the mission was updated to state that the society's mission is to promote the well-being of all individuals, regardless of gender. In 2004, IPPS introduced the first workshop and postgraduate course for male pelvic pain.

== Conferences ==
As a means for promoting pelvic pain education, the IPPS holds an Annual Scientific Meeting where health care providers and researchers share research findings and clinical care updates. They also hold classes at and participate in conferences with other organizations, including

- World Congress on Abdominal and Pelvic Pain with the International Association for the Study of Pain
- American College of Obstetricians and Gynecologists
- Canadian Society for the Advancement of Gynecologic Excellence
- PAINWeek

== Publications ==
The IPPS publishes clinical practice nationally recognized consensus guidelines on vulvar pain, patient assessment forms to be used for research and clinical care, and patient education booklets. The society promotes research collaborations with academic institutions and other pain education societies, patient educational events and social media podcasts. As part of a large awareness campaign, in 2017, the IPPS designated May as Pelvic Pain Awareness Month, which promotes pain education, awareness and fundraising.
