= Inguinofemoral lymphadenectomy =

- Specialty: Oncology

An inuinofemoral lymphadenectomy is one surgical treatment to remove inguinofemoral lymph node metastases involving at least three lymph nodes. Because gynecological cancers metastasize to the inguinofemoral lymph nodes this is the area of most concern for initial treatment. The malignancy spreads from the lymph node to the vulva, clitoris, and Bartholin glands, but the removal of the lymph nodes has a higher priority over the immediate removal of a small, localized tumor. Complications can arise and include: delayed wound healing, development of lymphoceles, bleeding, blood clot formation, and decreased sensation on the inside of the thigh probably caused by injury of the genital branch of the genitofemoral nerve.

== See also ==
- List of surgeries by type
