= Lichen sclerosus =

Itchy skin rash usually affecting the genitals

- Other names: Balanitis xerotica obliterans, lichen sclerosus et atrophicus, Lichen sclerosis et atrophicus, lichen plan atrophique, lichen plan scléreux, Kartenblattförmige Sklerodermie, Weissflecken Dermatose, lichen albus, lichen planus sclerosus et atrophicus, dermatitis lichenoides chronica atrophicans, kraurosis vulvae

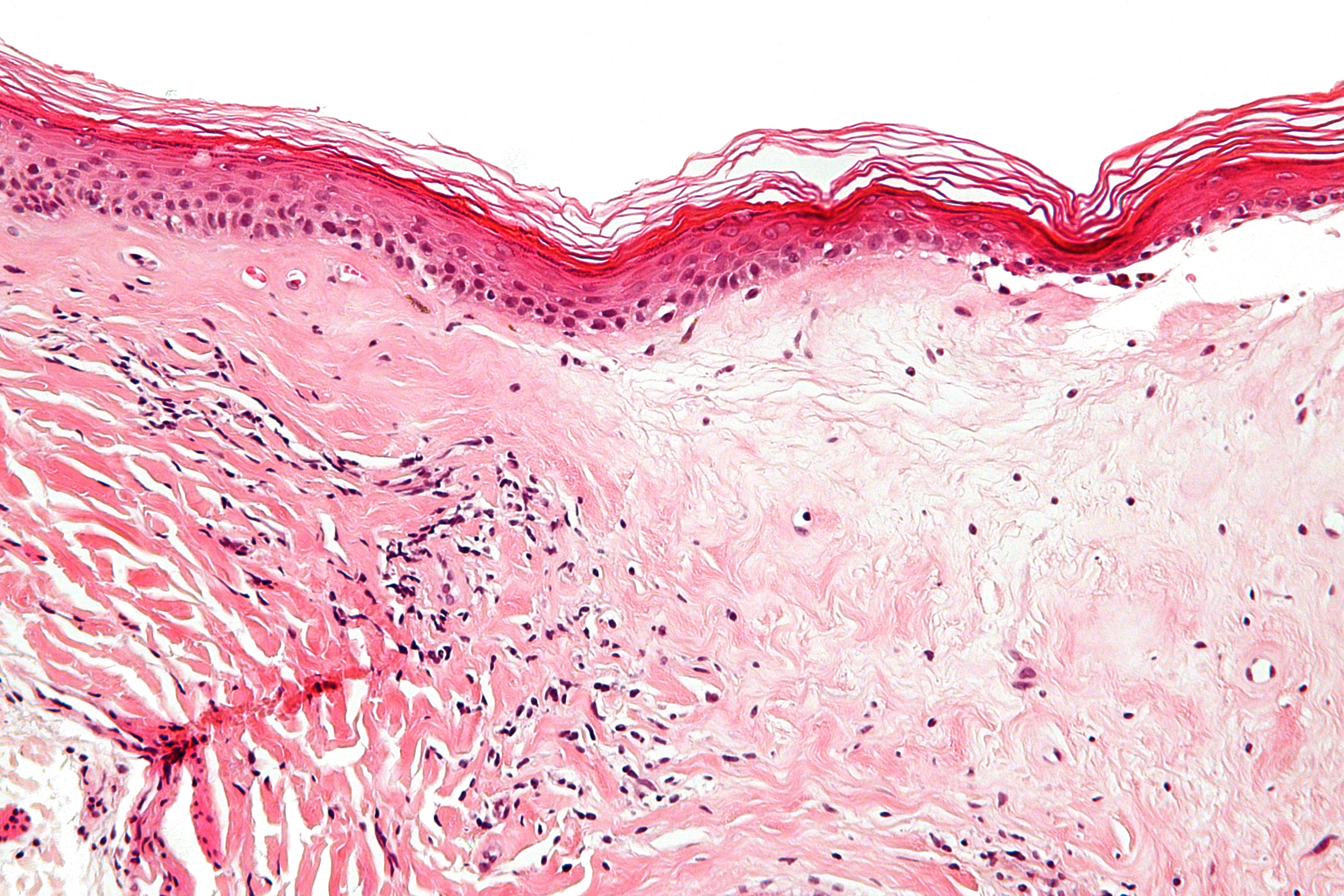
- Micrograph of lichen sclerosus showing the characteristic subepithelial sclerosis (right/bottom of image). H&E stain.
- Specialty: Gynaecology

Lichen sclerosus (LSc) is a chronic, inflammatory skin disease, of disputed cause, which can affect any body part of any person, but has a strong predilection for the genitals (penis, vulva); it has historically been called balanitis xerotica obliterans when it affects the penis. LSc is not contagious. There is a well-documented increase of genital cancer risk in LSc, potentially much reduced with early diagnosis and effective, definitive treatment, especially in men. LSc in adult age women is held to be incurable, although treatment can lessen its effects, and it often gets progressively worse if not treated properly. Most males with mild or intermediate disease, restricted to the foreskin or the glans penis can be cured by either medical or surgical treatment.

== Signs and symptoms ==
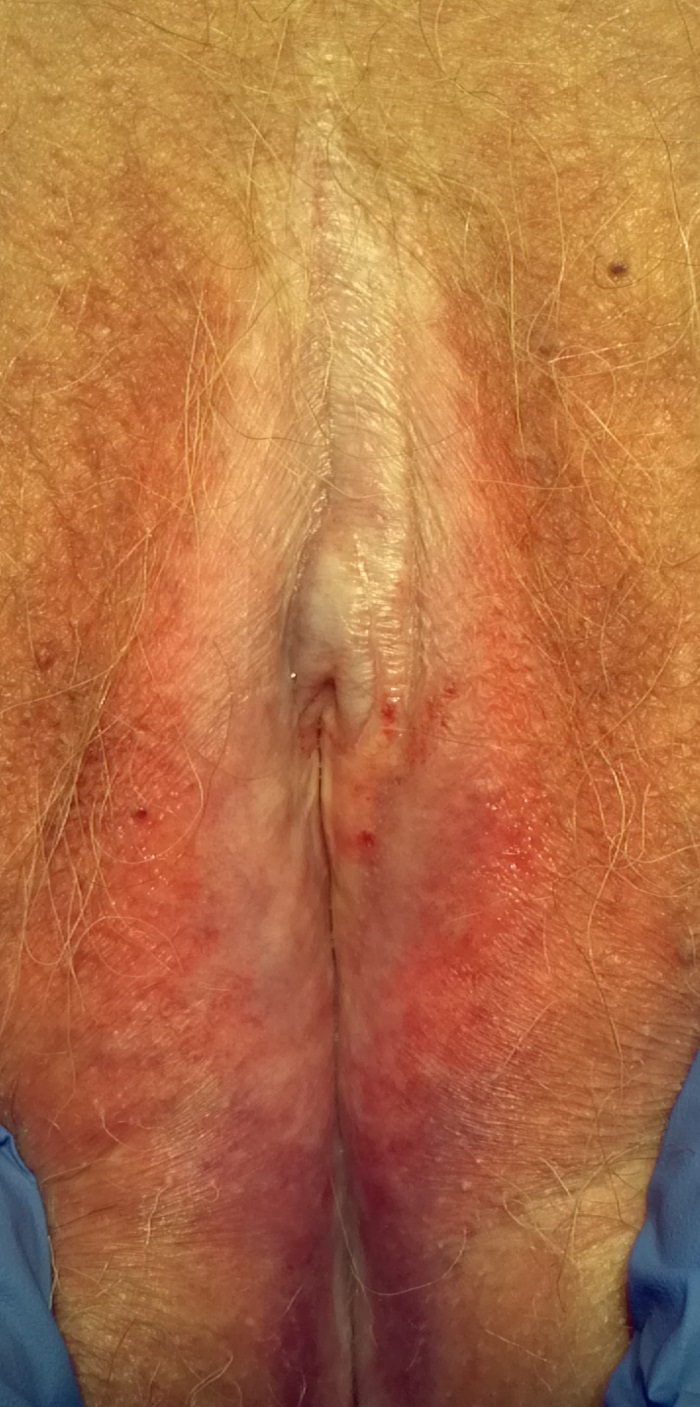
Lichen sclerosus affecting an 82-year-old woman, showing an ivory white coloring in the vulva, and also stretching downward to the perineum (the so called 'figure of eight' distribution).

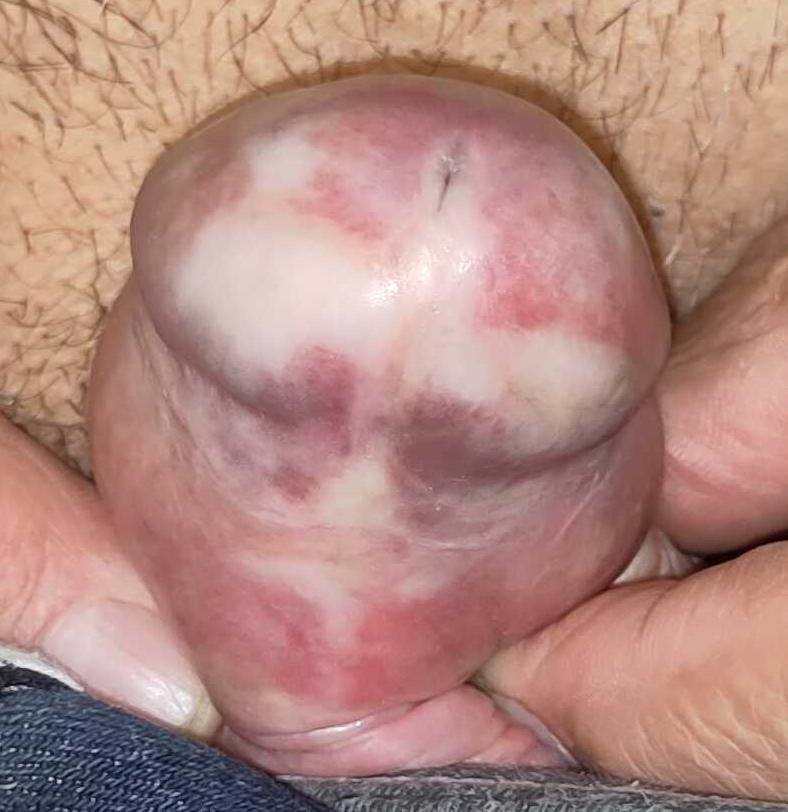
Lichen sclerosus. 70-year-old man; the 'figure of eight' distribution can be observed affecting the glans and ventral shaft.

LSc can occur without symptoms. White patches on the affected area, itching, pain, dyspareunia (in genital LSc), easier bruising, cracking, tearing and peeling, as well as hyperkeratosis, are common symptoms in both men and women. In women, the condition most commonly occurs on the vulva and around the anus with ivory-white elevations that may be flat and glistening. In men, difficulty retracting the foreskin, tightening of the foreskin and episodes of 'thrush' or cystitis, prostatitis and urethritis may be accompanying features of the history. An acute presentation is paraphimosis, where the foreskin has become fixed in the retracted state and cannot be replaced.

In males, the disease may present in several ways. Symptoms and signs may be subtle or florid. Lichenoid inflammation (creating 'waisting' or an 'hourglass' constrictive posthitis) and Zoonoid inflammation can be encountered and co-exist; Zoon's balanitis in the absence of LSc probably does not exist.

Progressive tissue damage causes a waxy pallor, etiolated tissue and then frank sclerosis in the form of grey/white patches on the glans and foreskin. It also causes post-inflammatory hyperpigmentation and melanosis.

Adhesions, partial or complete, sub coronal and trans coronal occur and the frenulum can become sclerotic and obliterated. Loss of dermal support creates telangiectasia and angiokeratomas. Progressive preputial sclerosis and narrowing (preputial stenosis), forming an 'indurated ring', which can make retraction more difficult or impossible (phimosis -'muzzling'). Meatal stenosis, making it more difficult or even impossible to urinate, may also occur.

In contrast to women, anal involvement in men is much less frequent.

On the non-genital skin, the disease may manifest as porcelain-white spots with small visible plugs inside the orifices of hair follicles or sweat glands on the surface. Thinning of the skin may also occur.

=== Psychological effect ===
Distress due to the discomfort and pain of lichen sclerosus is normal, as are concerns with self-esteem and sex. Counseling can help.

According to the US National Vulvodynia Association, which also supports women with lichen sclerosus, vulvo-vaginal conditions can cause feelings of isolation, hopelessness, low self-image, and much more. Some women are unable to continue working or have sexual relations, and may be limited in other physical activities. Depression, anxiety, and even anger are all normal responses to the ongoing pain LSc sufferers experience. Moreover, men also experience lowered quality of life, such as an impairment in daily activities and mental disturbances, albeit to a lower degree, since there are treatments that cure the disease more promptly.

== Pathophysiology ==
Although it is not completely established what causes LSc, several theories have been postulated. It is unanimously agreed that LSc is not contagious and cannot be caught from another person.

Several risk factors have been proposed, including exposure to the irritant effects of urine, autoimmune diseases, infections and genetic predisposition. There is evidence that LSc can be associated with thyroid disease.

=== Exposure to urine ===
There is a growing body of evidence, especially in men suggesting that prolonged exposure of susceptible tissues to the irritant effects of urine may contribute to the development of LSc.

Urine droplets that leak after urination can become trapped in the external genitalia (e.g., beneath the foreskin), creating an occluded environment that creates irritation and inflammation.

Several observations support the "urine occlusion hypothesis," including:

- Rare incidence in circumcised individuals: LSc is extremely rare in individuals circumcised during childhood.
- Resolution through circumcision: In affected men, LSc can be effectively treated or cured by circumcision.
- Recurrence with neo-foreskin formation: In circumcised men who later develop a neo-foreskin over time, the disease can reappear (especially associated with obesity).
- Pattern of distribution: The typical distribution of lichen sclerosus corresponds to areas exposed to urine. In men, the condition is usually confined beneath the foreskin, while in women, it can involve the perianal region.
- Lichen sclerosus in urine-diverted sites: When urine is diverted to other areas of the body, the skin in those regions can also develop lichen sclerosus.
- Association with incontinence: Men with LSc have been shown to "dribble" and similar findings have been published in women. In addition, urological procedures or genital piercings that disrupt the urethra and lead to post-void dribbling may also contribute to microincontinence and the subsequent development of LSc.

=== Genetic ===
LSc may have a genetic component. A strong correlation with LSc has been reported between twins and between family members.

=== Autoimmunity ===
Autoimmunity is a process in which the body fails to recognize itself and therefore attacks its own cells and tissue. Specific antibodies have been found in LSc sufferers. Furthermore, there seems to be a higher prevalence of other autoimmune diseases such as diabetes mellitus type 1, vitiligo, alopecia areata, and thyroid disease.

=== Infection ===
Both bacterial and viral pathogens have been implicated in the etiology of LSc. A disease that is similar to LSc, acrodermatitis chronica atrophicans, is caused by the spirochete Borrelia burgdorferi. Viral involvement of HPV and hepatitis C are also suspected.

A link with Lyme disease has been stated because of claims for the presence of Borrelia burgdorferi in LSc biopsy tissue. However this has been challenged by others.

=== Hormones ===
Since LSc in females is primarily found in women with a low estrogen state (prepubertal and postmenopausal women), hormonal influences have been postulated. To date though, very little evidence has been found to support that theory.

=== Local skin changes ===
Some findings suggest that LSc can be initiated through scarring or radiation, although those findings were sporadic and very uncommon.

== Diagnosis ==
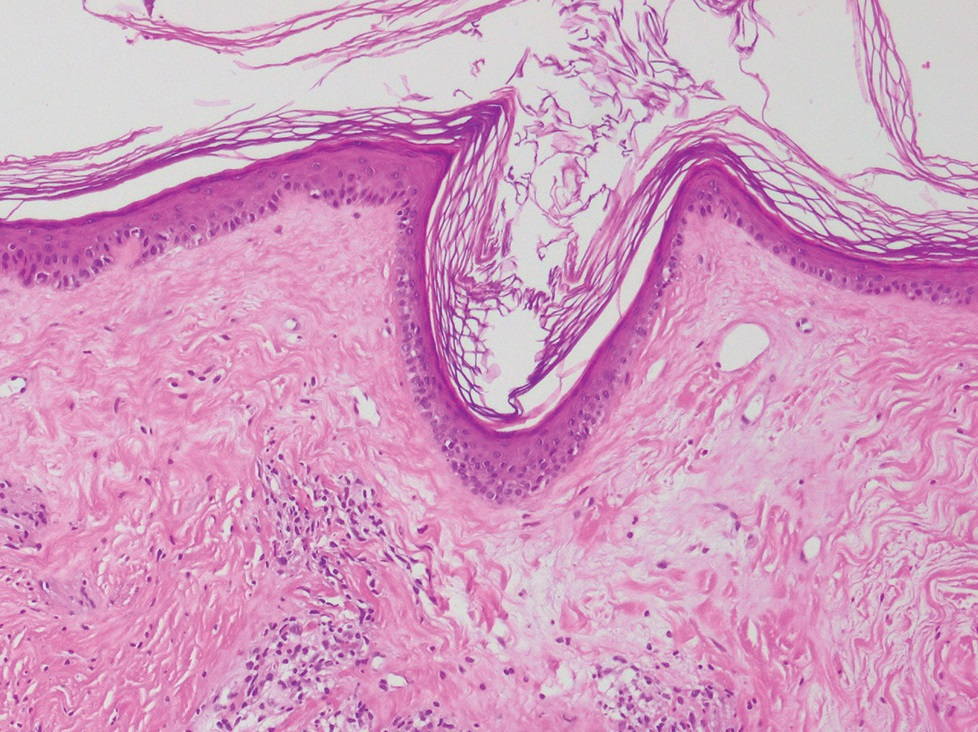
Photomicrograph of extragenital lichen sclerosus: epidermal atrophy, follicular plugging and basal vacuolization, and sclerosis with initial homogenization of collagen in the dermis.

The disease often goes undiagnosed for several years because it is either not recognized or misdiagnosed. For women, LSc is most commonly misdiagnosed as Vulvovaginal Candidiasis, also known as a yeast infection, because of the similarities in their symptoms and high frequency of occurrence (about 75% of women experience a yeast infection at least once in their lifetime). An estimated 8% of women experience yeast infections more than 4 times per year. LSc may not be correctly diagnosed until the patient is referred to a specialist after failing multiple courses of anti-fungals.

A biopsy of the affected skin can be done to confirm a diagnosis. When a biopsy is done, hyperkeratosis, atrophic epidermis, sclerosis of dermis and lymphocyte activity in dermis are histological findings associated with LSc. The biopsies are also checked for signs of dysplasia.

It has been noted that clinical diagnosis of balanitis xerotica obliterans can be "almost unmistakable," though there are other dermatologic conditions such as lichen planus, localized scleroderma, leukoplakia, vitiligo, and the cutaneous rash of Lyme disease can have a similar appearance.

== Treatment ==
=== Main treatment ===
There is no definitive cure for LSc in women. But cure can be achieved in men. Behavior change, as much as possible, is part of treatment. The patient should minimize or, preferably, stop scratching LSc-affected skin. Any scratching, stress or damage to the skin can worsen the disease. Scratching has been theorized to increase cancer risks. Furthermore, the patient should wear comfortable clothes and avoid tight clothing, as it is a major factor in the severity of symptoms in some cases.

Males should be encouraged to try to squeeze and massage the last few drops from the urethra after voiding, and then dab dry with plain tissue. Irritants like soap, shampoo and shower gel should be avoided. Pubic hair should be trimmed. Barrier preparations to protect the epithelium from urine are important.

Corticosteroids applied topically to the LSc-affected skin are the first-line treatment for lichen sclerosus in both women and men, with strong evidence showing that they are "safe and effective" when appropriately applied, even over long courses of treatment, rarely causing serious adverse effects. They improve or suppress all symptoms for some time, with high variance across patients, until it is required to use them again. Methylprednisolone aceponate has been used as a safe and effective corticosteroid for mild and moderate cases. For severe cases, it has been theorized that mometasone furoate might be safer and more effective than clobetasol. Recent studies have shown that topical calcineurin inhibitors such as tacrolimus can have an effect similar to corticosteroids, but its effects on cancer risks with LSc are not conclusively known. Based on limited evidence, a 2011 Cochrane review concluded that clobetasol propionate, mometasone furoate, and pimecrolimus (calcineurin inhibitor) all are effective therapies in treating genital lichen sclerosus. However, randomized-controlled trials are needed to further identify the optimal potency and regimen of topical corticosteroids, and assess the duration of remission and/or the prevention of flares patients experience with these topical therapies.

Continuous use of appropriate doses of topical corticosteroids is required to ensure symptoms remain relieved over the patient's lifetime. If continuously used, corticosteroids have been suggested to minimize the risk of cancer in various studies. In a prospective longitudinal cohort study of 507 women throughout six years, cancer occurred for 4.7% of patients who were only "partially compliant" with corticosteroid treatment, while it occurred in 0% of cases where they were "fully compliant". In a second study, of 129 patients, cancer occurred in 11% of patients, none of whom were fully compliant with corticosteroid treatment. Both those studies, however, also said that a corticosteroid as powerful as clobetasol is not necessary in most cases. In a prospective study of 83 patients, throughout 20 years, eight developed cancer. Six already had cancer at presentation and had not had treatment, while the other two were not taking corticosteroids often enough. In all three studies, every single cancer case observed occurred in patients who were not taking corticosteroids as often as the study recommended.

Continuous, abundant usage of emollients topically applied to the LSc-affected skin is recommended to improve symptoms. They can supplement, but not replace, corticosteroid therapy. They can be used much more frequently than corticosteroids due to the extreme rarity of serious adverse effects. With genital LSc, appropriate lubrication should always be used before and during sex in order to avoid pain and worsening of the disease. Some oils, such as olive oil and coconut oil, can be used to accomplish both the emollient and sexual lubrication function.

In males, it has been reported that circumcision can have positive effects, but does not necessarily prevent further flare-ups of the disease and does not protect against the possibility of cancer. Circumcision does not prevent or cure LSc. In fact, "balanitis xerotica obliterans" in men was first reported by Stühmer in 1928 as a condition affecting a set of circumcised men.

=== Other treatments ===
Carbon dioxide laser treatment is safe and effective, and improves symptoms over the long term, but it does not lower cancer risks.

Platelet-rich plasma was reported to be effective in one study, producing large improvements in the patients' quality of life, with an average IGA improvement of 2.04 and DLQI improvement of 7.73.

== Prognosis ==
The disease can last for a considerably long time. Occasionally, "spontaneous cure" may occur, particularly in young girls.

Lichen sclerosus is associated with a higher risk of cancer. Skin that has been scarred as a result of lichen sclerosus is more likely to develop skin cancer. Women with lichen sclerosus may develop vulvar carcinoma. Lichen sclerosus is associated with from 3 to 7% of all cases of vulvar squamous cell carcinoma. In women, it has been reported that 33.6 times higher vulvar cancer risk is associated with LSc. A study in men noted that: "the reported incidence of penile carcinoma in patients with balanitis xerotica obliterans is 2.6–5.8%".

== Epidemiology ==
There is a bimodal age distribution in the incidence of LSc in women. It occurs in females with an average age of diagnosis of 7.6 years in girls and 60 years old in women. The average age of diagnosis in boys is from 9 to 11 years old.

In men, the most common age of incidence is 21 to 30.

== History ==
In 1875, Weir reported what was possible vulvar or oral LSc was "ichthyosis." In 1885, Breisky described kraurosis vulvae. In 1887, Hallopeau described a series of extragenital cases of LSc. In 1892, Darier formally described the classic histopathology of LSc. In 1900, the concept was formed that scleroderma and LSc were closely related, which continues to this day. In 1901, pediatric LSc was described. From 1913 to present, the concept that scleroderma is not closely related to LSc also was formed. In 1920, Taussig established vulvectomy as the treatment of choice for kraurosis vulvae, a premalignant condition. In 1927, Kyrle defined LSc ("white spot disease") as an entity sui generis. In 1928, Stühmer described balanitis xerotica obliterans as a post-circumcision phenomenon. In 1936, retinoids (vitamin A) were used to treat LSc. In 1945, testosterone was used in genital LSc. In 1961, the use of corticosteroids started. Jeffcoate presented an argument against vulvectomy for simple LSc. In 1971, progesterone was used in LSc. Wallace defined clinical factors and the epidemiology of LSc. In 1976, Friedrich defined LSc as a dystrophic and not an atrophic condition, and "et atrophicus" was dropped. The International Society for Study of Vulvar Disease classification system established that "kraurosis" and "leukoplakia" were no longer to be used. In 1980, fluorinated and superpotent steroids were first used to treat LSc. In 1981, studies into HLA serotypes and LSc were published. In 1984, etretinate and acitretin were used in LSc. In 1987, LSc was linked with Borrelia infection.

Lichen sclerosus et atrophicus was first described in 1887 by François Henri Hallopeau. Since not all cases of lichen sclerosus exhibit atrophic tissue, the use of et atrophicus was dropped in 1976 by the International Society for the Study of Vulvovaginal Disease (ISSVD), officially proclaiming the name lichen sclerosus.

== See also ==
- Lichen planus
- List of cutaneous conditions
- List of cutaneous conditions associated with increased risk of nonmelanoma skin cancer
- List of human leukocyte antigen alleles associated with cutaneous conditions
