= Vulval vestibule =

Part of the vulva that contains the openings

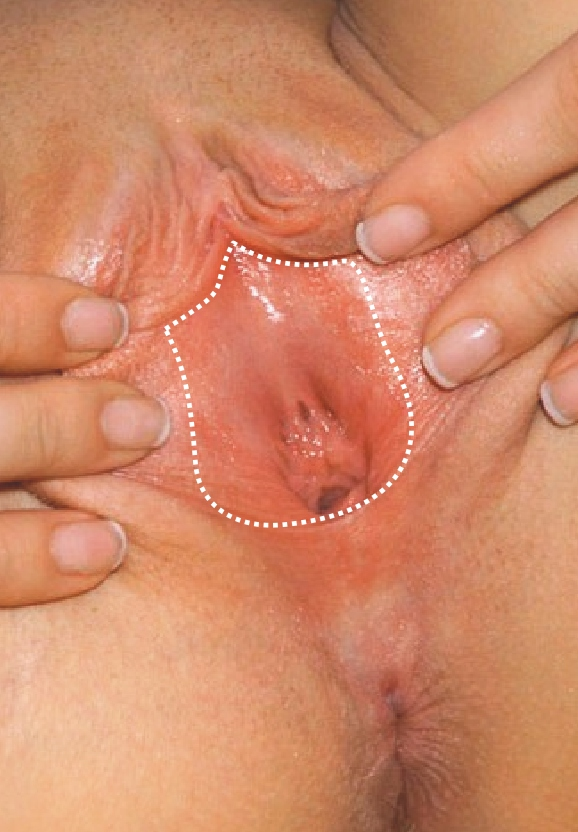
- Vestibule marked by a dotted line

Details
- Precursor: Urogenital sinus
- Part of: Vulva
- System: Reproductive system

Identifiers
- Latin: vestibulum vaginae
- TA98: A09.2.01.011
- TA2: 3558
- FMA: 19970

The vulval vestibule (also known as the vulvar vestibule or vestibule of vagina) is the part of the vulva between the labia minora. At the innermost part are the vaginal introitus and urinary meatus. The Bartholin's and Skene's glands each have two openings to the vestibule on the inside. The outer edge, marked by a coloration difference in the tissues, is called Hart's line, named after David Berry Hart.

The vestibule represents the distal end of the urogenital sinus of the embryo.

== Structure ==
Structures opening in the vulval vestibule are the urethra (urinary meatus), vagina, Bartholin's glands, and Skene's glands.

The external urethral orifice is placed about 25–30 millimetres (1–1.2 in) behind the clitoris and immediately in front of that of the vagina; it usually assumes the form of a short, sagittal cleft with slightly raised margins. Nearby are the openings of the Skene's ducts.

The vaginal orifice is a median slit below and behind the opening of the urethra; its size varies inversely with that of the hymen.

To the left and right of the vulval vestibule are the labia minora. Anterior to it are the clitoral hood, frenulum clitoridis, and the clitoral glans. Posterior to it is the posterior commissure of the labia minora and the frenulum of labia minora.

The sides of the vestibule are visible as Hart's line on the inside of the inner lips; Hart's line is the outer edge of the area and marks the change from vulvar skin to the smoother transitional skin of the vulva.

== Other animals ==
Except for great apes (including humans) and some rodents, the vestibule in most female placentals (urogenital sinus) is a tubular and internal structure.

== Clinical significance ==
The prevalence of pain at the vulvar vestibule is relatively common. A study by the University of Michigan found that about 28% of people with vulvas have experienced vulvar vestibular pain in the past, and about 8% had the pain in the last six months.
