= Carla Rice =

Canadian educator, project director, consultant, speaker, and writer

Carla Rice is a Canadian educator, project director, consultant, speaker and author on women's body image issues. She is a Tier I Canadian Research Chair in Feminist Studies and Social Practice in the College of Social and Applied Human Sciences at the University of Guelph in Ontario, Canada. This role includes the challenging of stereotypes through the investigation of ways that perceptions of women's bodies can be changed through images and stories.

== Early life and education ==
Rice completed her honors Bachelor of Arts degree at Harvard University in June 1985, graduating magna cum laude for her thesis, Fashion, Feminism, and Conflict: The Politics of Dress Reform from 1850-1914. She continued her studies at the Ontario Institute for Studies in Education, earning her Master of Education in Applied Psychology in November 1993, with her qualifying research paper, The Politics of Program Development: Women's Services, State Power, and Social Change. Rice received her Ph.D in Women's Studies at York University in June 2004. For her dissertation, Becoming Women: Body Image, Identity, and Difference in the Passage to Womanhood, she received the Mary McEwan Memorial Award in May 2004. Rice was also nominated for the Governor General's Gold Medal Award in 2004.

== Career ==
Rice was a course instructor for the Department of Public Health in the city of Toronto from January 1994-March 1994. From 1996-1998, she worked as a teaching assistant at York University in the Foundations Course, Women, Children and the Family in Europe. She continued to teach at York University from 1998-1999, becoming course director for feminist research methods for their School of Women's Studies.

In 2000, Carla Rice began teaching a course about Women and Health at the University of Toronto's Institute for Women's Studies and Gender Studies. In 2003 she became a faculty member and course instructor for Gender and Health in the Graduate program of Public Health Sciences for the University. Rice remained at the University of Toronto until June 2004.

In September 2004, Rice became an assistant professor at Trent University in Ontario, Canada, teaching in the Women's Studies program. Throughout her career at Trent University from September 2004-April 2008, Carla Rice directed and co-directed courses, including Women and Popular Culture, Introduction to Women's Studies, Women and Health, Feminist Psychologies, and The Abject Body.

In 2012, Rice founded the Re*Vision Centre for Art and Social Justice. This is an arts methodology research hub using stories and narratives to discuss systemic injustices.

In 2014, Rice teaches at the University of Guelph, in Ontario, Canada, in the College of Social and Applied Human Sciences as a Tier II Canadian Research Chair in Care, Gender, and relationships.

== Research ==
Rice conducts research in several areas: stories relating to body image; variation in young women's experiences of growing to adulthood; and everyday experiences of women with disabilities and physical differences in social and health care encounters; and body image as an equity issue in an educational setting.

Rice examines how new technology and artistic techniques such as photography, autobiographical filmmaking and drama can change views about bodily differences, including size, disabilities, altered appearances, an atypical bodies.

== Selected publications ==
Rice has written many academic and professional publications, including refereed articles and book chapters, invited articles and book chapters, technical handbooks, reports and resources, newsletters, brochures and booklets, many of which have been translated into French, Spanish and Persian. Rice's works discuss topics from feminism, post-structuralism, and critical race and disability studies perspectives on eating, weight and embodiment. She has integrated her clinical and research activities into many co-authored professional and popular resources. Rice's work is frequently cited by scholars in the fields of women's studies, body image, obesity and eating disorders.

- Carla Rice (5 March 2014). Becoming Women: The Embodied Self in Image Culture. University of Toronto Press. ISBN 978-1-4426-1005-7.
- Carla Rice, "Out from Under Occupation: Transforming our Relationships with our Bodies" Canadian Woman Studies, 14(3), 44-51, 1994.
- Margaret Hobbs; Carla Rice (2013). Gender and Women's Studies in Canada: Critical Terrain. Canadian Scholars’ Press. ISBN 978-0-88961-484-0.

Rice's journal article Out from Under Occupation: Transforming our Relationships with our Bodies (1994), explains her use of the metaphor of "occupation" to describe the ways in which women's relationship with their bodies is a source of negative stress. This article presents statistical facts demonstrating the widespread dislike of women for their bodies. Rice examines the role of advertising in promoting the importance of thinness, and the growing rates of eating disorders such as anorexia and bulimia which have resulted. She applies this theory of "occupation" to women's negative emotions about weight, racial stereotyping and other bodily differences.

== See also ==
- Body dysmorphic disorder
- Effects of teen advertising on body image
- Exploitation of women in mass media
- Fat feminism
- Gender role
- Identity politics
- Intersectionality
- Killing Us Softly
- Self-image
- Socialist feminism
- Womanism
