= Gender in advertising =

Gender in advertising refers to the images and concepts in advertising that depict and reinforce stereotypical gender roles. Advertisements containing subliminal or direct messages about physical attractiveness and beauty have been of particular interest regarding their impact on men, women, and youth. Gendered advertisements have and continue to shape what is expected of a distinct gender, regarding physique and attitude.

== Creation and maintenance of gender normality ==
Advertising is a significant agent of socialization in modern industrialized societies, and is used as a tool to maintain certain social constructions, such as gender. Men and women are depicted as differing in attitudes, behavior, and social statuses. These images are crafted to mimic real life, leading to confusion when separating the concepts of fantasy and reality in regards to advertising. In his book Gender Advertising, author Erving Goffman uses the term "commercial realism" for advertisers' attempts to present the advertising world in ways which it could be real. While often exaggerated, the gender stereotypes presented in the media are very much real. This is at least in some part due to the fact that when biases are present in an advertisement, they are more easily integrated into the viewer's beliefs, or if the beliefs are already present, then they are strengthened. When viewers saw an advertisement in which men were behaving non-stereotypically, the viewer was less likely to stereotype others on the basis of their gender. Men have historically been portrayed as dominant, financial providers, career-focused, assertive and independent, whereas women have been shown as subordinate, low-position workers, or loving wives and mothers whose responsibilities focus on raising children and doing housework. Some researchers argue that portrayals not aligning with a viewer's reality may contribute to feelings of inferiority or impact mental health. Goffman compares the dominant and subordinate positions of men and women as similar to that of a parent and child.

There are three prominent ideologies regarding the relationship between advertisements and societal beliefs. The mirror ideology looks at advertisements as a reflection of the culture from which the advertisements are produced, whereas the mold ideology thinks of advertising as the cast that molds the culture. The last suggested relationship between advertisements and societal beliefs is a mixture of the first two and takes from both sides. Advertising professionals tend to follow the mirror ideology, and while many of them are just as capable as the consumer of identifying sexism in advertisements, these professionals tend to have a higher tolerance for sexist themes. Chinese advertising professionals, when asked in a study, view their adverts as a replication of reality rather than as a pseudo-reality that is replicated by the real world. There is much debate in the advertising world as to whether or not self-regulation is all that is needed to make discriminatory themes less common, with those in favor of this way forward advocating for awards and positive reinforcement to encourage changes while those in opposition argue that this has failed to bring about the necessary changes so far.

== Presentation of gender roles ==
=== Displays in youth advertising ===
Advertisements are found in many parts of everyday life, such as on TV, billboards, and social media. Children are exposed to these advertisements from a young age, which can shape their thoughts and opinions while they are still developing. Young children often learn by watching and copying what they see around them..

Advertisements that market to young girls include a variety of stimuli that inform and shape children's inner constructs of gender. In advertisements marketed towards young girls, the color pink is frequently used, and the subjects are typically shown in clean and calm environments playing with toys that mimic real life expectations of women, such as toys that mimic household actions such as cooking and cleaning, as well as dress-up dolls. The most famous example of the dress-up doll is Barbie, which has played a role in the internalized body ideals of women across generations, resulting in a high level of body dissatisfaction.

High beauty standards are also placed on young girls through means such as teen magazines and social media, resulting in an increasing pressure on young girls to appear sexualized and conventionally attractive. Recent studies have shown that young girls that spend more time on social media show increased pressure and efforts in emulating the images that they see.

Young boys are commonly seen in advertisements displaying aggressive, and occasionally violent behavior when playing with their toys. Boys can be seen playing with a variety of toys with themes of violence, such as action figures wielding weapons, or toy weapons, with research suggesting that this type of play can desensitize young boys to violence.

Boys have historically been subject to a wider variety of toys or games to play with. Some examples of these traditionally include hardware tools, cars, and action figures. Boys are also shown playing with toys that mimic a wider variety of skills and abilities that could be used in workplaces, influencing them to desire a wider variety of jobs from a young age.

=== Displays of feminine gender roles ===
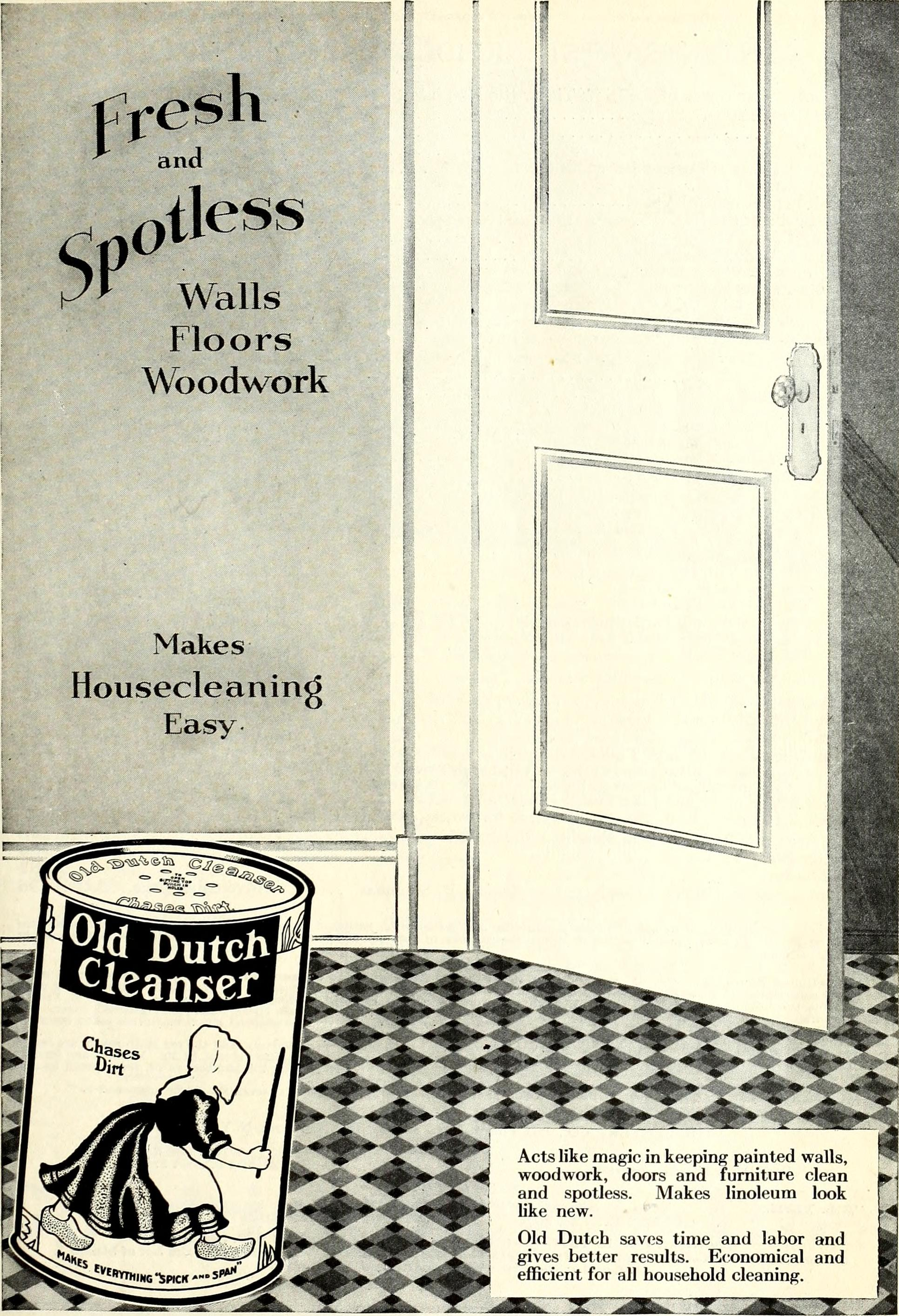
1920s cleaning advertisement featuring a feminine image

Goffman states that women are weakened by advertising portrayals in five categories: relative size, feminine touch, function ranking ritualization of subordination, and licensed withdrawal. Advertisements that are targeted at women, or that use female actors, often draw from themes of family-life, the natural environment, and fashion. Women are also less often in humorous advertisements, and when advertisements are less comical, the stereotypes they portray tend to be taken more seriously.

In the late 19th and early 20th centuries, products, such as; moisturizers, soaps, deodorants, and shampoos were marketed to women through newly developed tactics of fear, sex, and emulation, three key strategies that continues to influence advertising into the modern era. Fear tactics in advertisements from this time period often depict women that fail to meet the social expectation that they always appear presentable facing social rejection, painting them as outcasts and undesirable to men, with many examples from advertisements of this period shaming women that fail to maintain an assumed level of personal hygiene. Advertisements held the promise that through buying their product, women would become more desirable.

Expectations that women were to maintain clean environments, care for their children, and serve their husbands were enforced through advertisements of this period as well. Many advertisers held the promise that a potential buyer will be able to perform these tasks more simply and more efficiently. Female subjects are commonly portrayed as helpless in any areas besides what is expected of them, relying on men to perform more mentally or physically laborious tasks for them.

==== Feminine roles in tech advertising ====
Tech advertising has historically reflected broader societal expectations of women, often portraying them in stereotypical domestic or supportive roles. Apple Inc. created campaigns that attempted to challenge these roles, reshaping how femininity was represented in the tech industry.

The 1981 "Homemaker" ad reimagined the role of women as homemakers, featuring an interviewer asking a woman about using the computer for stereotypical domestic tasks, while the woman responded by listing the professional tasks she could accomplish with the computer .

Apple's 1984 Super Bowl advertisement, directed by Ridley Scott, further disrupted gender norms. Featuring Anya Major as a hammer-throwing athlete, the ad displayed acts of rebellion and change, challenging the conformity represented by IBM. Ridley Scott has claimed that he purposefully chose Anya Major, an athlete and actress, for her strength and commanding presence, which defied traditional representations of women as passive or secondary figures. By casting a woman as the central figure of action and resistance, Apple broke away from conventional portrayals of women in tech advertising. Street's documentary highlights how the ad deliberately used a female protagonist to redefine gender narratives in the industry.

These efforts to include women in unconventional roles culminated in the "Think Different" campaign in the late 1990s, which celebrated diversity and individuality highlighting many influential women including Amelia Earhart, Eleanor Roosevelt, Maria Callas, and more, continuing Apple's legacy of challenging traditional stereotypes and promoting inclusivity.

=== Displays of masculine gender roles ===
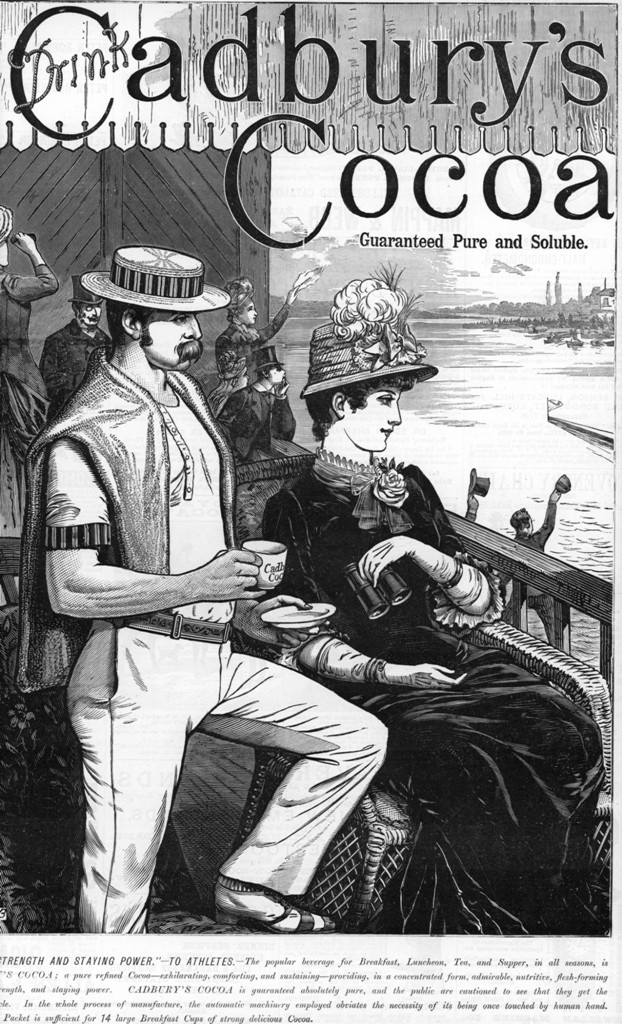
1885 advertisement for Cadbury's Cocoa displaying traditional male and female gender roles

Men have historically been portrayed in advertisements as independent, breadwinners, tough, invulnerable, athletic, and generally more capable than their female counterparts. Men in advertisements are usually pictured as leaders in and out of the household, being able to accomplish extreme tasks with little effort or assistance. When shown in advertisements with women, men are typically seen in a dominant position both socially and physically. This can be seen in advertisements that show a man finding entertainment in watching a woman perform daily tasks, or critiquing a woman's lack of ability to perform these tasks to his standard.

Research found more than 100 advertisements during sports coverage targeted towards men portrayed men as a part of a family, but only 7 of those portrayed said men with emotional aspects and connections with the children in their family. In 225 advertisements directed towards children, 7 of them portrayed the role of a father, with 20 of them portraying the role of a mother. In 200 commercials during programming directed towards women, only 2 of the advertisements depicted fathers in a supportive role with children. Men that fail to meet these standards, or that show feminine traits such as compassion, emotionality can be seen in advertisements as weak, and often as a source of comedy. According to the concept of hegemonic masculinity, that suggests a social value is placed on the masculine performance of gender roles, displaying feminine traits such as these results in less favorable treatment than those who display traditional characteristics of masculinity. Advertisements that defy male stereotypes were also found to be mainly targeted towards women.

== Presentation of bodies ==
Many advertisements depict people with idealized bodies, many of which are photo-shopped or edited in some way. Studies have shown that consuming advertisements that contain ideal body image leads to an increase in body dissatisfaction, especially in young girls. Regardless of gender, self-objectification when viewing ideal body images in media may lead to negative feelings towards one's body. Thinking of one's body from an outside viewer's perspective may also lead to body shame, appearance anxiety, and may contribute to certain eating disorders or disordered eating.

=== Displays of female bodies ===
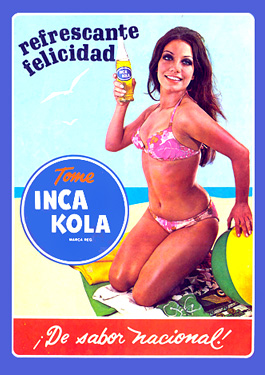
Gladys Arista, a former model, posing in a swimsuit for an Inca Kola advertisement in 1972.

Advertisements use female bodies as a key form of marketing to consumers, with women often appearing as an object of desire, something to be controlled, something to be won by men, as well as delicate and fragile in nature. Many aspects of how female bodies are portrayed in advertising stem from the male gaze.

Female bodies in advertisements can be portrayed in a hyper-feminine, pornographic way in order to market to a heterosexual male audience. Women are usually placed in positions of submission, and are urged to pursue beauty and sex appeal through acts and behaviors of submission. In many advertisements, phallic objects are shown aiming at the female subjects face, breasts genitalia, or anal region in order to induce images of sexual intercourse. Sexual objectification of women may lead to anxiety, depression, and eating disorders. Women often compare their bodies to idols like models and celebrities, which lead to dissatisfaction with their body.

Women are displayed as fragile, with this being commonly pictured through the feminine touch. The feminine touch refers to the idea that women are gentle by nature, and often use the image of women's hands to frame the focus of the ad in a delicate way. The feminine touch can also refer to a woman lightly grazing her own body with her hands in a similarly delicate manner. and often seen with vacant expressions, and in dynamic poses that convey them as something to be beheld.

Magazine advertisements highlighting a thin, attractive female model yield greater self-objectification and the process of inspecting this type of advertisement can encourage women to think about their physical appearance as if looking on as a critical observer.

Aging women are told through media that the way in which to maintain their femininity is to preserve their bodies. Advertisements profit off of sexually exploiting young women, but steer away from acknowledging the sexuality of aging women.

=== Displays of male bodies ===
Male bodies are displayed in advertising with dominance, aligning with the belief that men are physically stronger and overall more dominant than women. When pictured with women, this is often illustrated through a man holding physical control over a woman, with images of a man's hands with a firm hold on a part of a woman's body, or through men gazing at the female subject of the photo while her expression is placed elsewhere.

Men in advertisements are depicted with an ideal body type, resulting in them usually being objectified and depersonalized. Muscular body types have become the desired norm for men, regardless of their sexuality. Aging men also face the social pressure to defy aging in an attempt to maintain their masculinity, and thus, their power.

The representation of ectomorphs (thin and lightly muscled) in advertising is limited predominantly to the advertisement of clothing that may look more appealing on slimmer, taller men. Endomorphs (soft and round) are depicted less frequently, occasionally appearing as a target of ridicule when portrayed. Representations of male bodies are often used irrespective of their relevance to the product being promoted.

== Gender in advocacy advertising ==
=== Purity ===
Throughout the 1990s and 2000s, many activist groups campaigned in advocacy of purity. Young people of the time, particularly young girls and women, were asked to pledge to not have sex until marriage, often pledging their virginity to their fathers. In her book, The Purity Myth: How America's Obsession with Virginity is Hurting Young Women, author Jessica Valenti documents the cultural impact of this campaign. Purity was promoted in advertisements through print and television, as well as sermons, conferences, magazines, and political campaigns to promote abstinence in young people.

Images of purity in advertising were often portrayed through young, thin white women wearing pure white dresses in order to conform to a traditional, evangelical Christian form of purity. The evangelical origins of this campaign imply that there is an inherit complementary function to the bodies and traditional roles of men and women that is to be upheld.

People who pledged to save their virginity often wore forms of clothing, such as graphic t-shirts containing imagery of cherries, a traditional symbol of purity, and phrases often including the word 'chaste' to inform viewers of their sexual status as well as purity rings.

Fear tactics were used to promote these ideals. These fear tactics included telling young people that they are far more likely to receive sexually transmitted infections, with an emphasis on the fear of HIV/AIDS, if they had sex before marriage. American school systems taught students that abstinence was a morally correct option without teaching proper sex education. Additionally, young women were warned that if they were to take birth control, they were increasing their chances of contracting STIs, and that the performance of abortions may kill them. Additionally, pressure was put on young female celebrities to maintain a pure image, with a failure to do so resulting in public ridicule and shunning.

== Depictions across cultures ==
=== United States ===
A study analyzed the gender representation differences of 394 Spanish and English TV advertisements in the United States in 2013. The results show that gender stereotypes are common in both samples. For example, more women are depicted as young people, usually at home. Males usually dress formally, while females often wear suggestive clothes. Men obviously dominate the narrator role, and product category is closely related to gender. From the perspective of social cognitive theory, advertisements rarely depict women in the workplace, which may decrease interest in jobs traditionally related to the opposite sex.

In Spanish and English advertising samples, women wear more suggestive and sexy clothing than men, and men are more fully dressed. In addition, narrators were more often male in English (male: 65.1%; female: 34.9%) and Spanish TV advertisements (male: 73.7%; female: 26.3%). The age of the protagonist has obvious gender division. More women are younger than men. Society is more tolerant of men's aging.

=== Britain ===
Among British advertisements, there were no significant differences in the roles occupied by male and female lead characters. Females appear in business or professional settings and men take on family responsibilities. In British advertisements from 2000 to 2001, the distribution of advertising clues of men (52%) and women (48%) was similar. There were 61% of male leads playing professional roles, compared to 39% of women.

It is now illegal to use gender stereotypes to sell goods in Britain. Britain's Advertising Standards Authority announced the ban in December 2019. The new regulation stipulates that "advertisements must not include gender stereotypes that are likely to cause harm, or serious or widespread offence", and cannot show people "failing to achieve a task specifically because of their gender". For example, the advertisers cannot show women having poor driving skills or men struggling with housework in advertisements. Still, there are those who have a deep understanding of the changes made to the ASA, such as Dr. Alexandros Antoniou and Dr. Dimitris Akrivos, who see them as more of a step in the right direction rather than the solution that is truly needed. The line between what is deemed acceptable or harmful was left unclear when advertisements focus on a person's physical appearance. The guidelines showed a disregard for limiting nudity and sexualization of people in advertisements that are potentially demeaning. The complex interactions between gender and other aspects of a person's identity were not mentioned at all, and no push was made to make advertisements more inclusionary of people who do not conform to the gender binary. Advertisements viewed as humorous are, at times, allowed by the ASA, even if the advertisements are potentially harmful, so whether or not humor makes an advertisement less harmful may need to be addressed by future ASA guideline changes.

=== Saudi Arabia ===
Saudi Arabia, which has one of the fastest growing markets for advertising, operates strictly according to Islamic law. Men and women enjoy different rights; women may appear on TV only in limited roles. Women are emphasized in decorative features in traditional family roles. Most narrators tend to be male, and women are less likely to appear in professional situations or the workplace than men.

The environments and occasions in which men and women appear differ as well. Women are more often shown around their families and indoors, whereas men are depicted outdoors, in the workplace or as leaders. The age range is very important in Saudi Arabia's advertisements because Islamic dress codes for women are more strict from adolescence. Of advertisements containing professional roles, 78% were filled by males, compared to 22% by females.

=== YouTube Advertisements in Israel and Germany ===
In 2022, there were two billion people who used YouTube once a month, and a majority of users were men, although this majority has been diminishing over time. An analysis of online advertisements is becoming increasingly important as YouTube's users are predominantly young people who are actively forming their beliefs. Many differences were found between YouTube advertisements and advertisements from traditional media forms, as well as the types of gender stereotypes displayed in its advertisements. What kinds of differences those entail depends on where the viewer lives as well as the user viewing history on the site, which was accounted for in any statistics mentioned in this section.

While it is more common for media adverts to focus on stereotypes regarding employment, most gender stereotypes depicted in YouTube adverts are based on physical appearance. Women in adverts in Germany were twice as likely to have a body shape preferred by society, while in Israel, they were five times as likely. Women in Israeli advertising were overwhelmingly the consumers of a product and were rarely if ever, depicted as authority figures. In German advertisements, women were seven times more likely to be young, and in Israel, it was not much better as women were five times as likely to be young. So much of the time, women in these advertisements were young consumers who had appearances viewed as the ideal in society, which alienates the majority of women who do not fall into this demographic and can set sexist and unrealistic expectations. Women were half as likely to be in comedic advertisements. Like in many other cultures, the narration was dominated by male voices in both Israel and Germany. Men in both cultures were three times more likely than women to make fact-based arguments for a product; this rate was twice as high as that observed in traditional advertisements. To sum up, men are more often made to be funny and intellectual, while women tend to be objectified often without having a voice in the same way men do.

=== Television advertisements in Hong Kong, Japan, and South Korea ===
Often, countries and territories in general regions tend to be grouped together, but gender advertisements in any media form will always vary to some degree depending on the culture that produces the media. Still, general trends in advertising tend to be relatively consistent across cultures, as sexist media depictions exist just about everywhere media exists.

In South Korea, men were over 56 times more likely to be fully clothed than women. Women were also four times as likely to be seen in a home setting, and less than .05% of the time, women were seen in the workplace. Of all three places studied, only South Korea had more female advertisers than males. Narration in South Korean advertisements was roughly evenly distributed between men and women, but when beauty and hygiene advertisements were ignored, men were more likely to be narrators.

In Japan, more than 45% of women in advertisements were dressed in a suggestive manner. Japan had arguably the most even overall representation of people in the workplace and people at home, albeit it was still very uneven. Men were 1.7 times as likely to be in a work environment, and women were 1.82 more likely to be in a domestic environment. In both Japan and South Korea, men tended to be more middle-aged.

Of the three countries and territories, Hong Kong was the most egalitarian in regard to gender. Women were only very slightly more likely than men to appear in advertisements in a home setting, but they were nearly seven times less likely to be in advertisements in a work setting. This was the only place out of the three where men in advertisements were also predominately young. Still, women in the advertisements were often young and suggestively dressed nearly 33% of the time.

In all countries and territories, women depicted in advertisements were young at least 70% of the time. Men were also across all three cultures never suggestively dressed more than 4% of the time. Women were always more likely to be provocatively dressed and were always less likely to be in a work environment. Aside from hygiene and beauty products, which women appeared in at twice the rate of men, women were less often the narrator.

== Viewers' perception of traditionally gendered advertisements ==
There exists a common misconception that gender stereotypes in advertising help boost sales, but this is largely the opposite of the truth. When advertisements' depictions of gender were non-stereotypical, people generally viewed the brand and product in a more positive light while experiencing a feeling of social connectedness. Reactions are dependent on how one views gender, but generally, when men were the focus of these non-stereotypical advertisements, it resulted in more interest in the product, increased sales, and more attentive viewing of the advertisement. A study conducted in South Africa, the UK, and Poland found that regardless of political affiliation when men played roles where they displayed more warmth at the expense of competence, the advertisements were viewed more positively. The study found that the contents of the stereotype were more important than the fact that there simply existed a stereotype in the advertisement, and this could be an explanation for why studies looking at the effects of female stereotypes on consumer opinion often yielded conflicting results. Often, it seems that positive evaluations lie in likability and warmth rather than gender stereotypes.

Gender stereotypes in advertisements generally have a negative impact on the product and company, but the evaluation of these stereotypes and advertisements by an individual is much more nuanced than any generalization can be. In a South Korean study, it was found that a person's desire to be unique and whether they tend to be independent or interdependent affected their perceptions of an advertisement that contained gender stereotypes. Those who felt a greater need for uniqueness and viewed themselves as relatively independent had a lower tolerance for gender stereotypes, whereas the opposite was true for those who think of themselves as generally interdependent and do not desire high levels of uniqueness.

A large factor in the evaluation of advertisements depicting gender stereotypes or non-cis gendered people was political ideology. Conservatives in the aforementioned multinational study were found to view advertisements containing traditional gender roles slightly more positively than liberals. Despite conservatives in all countries liking the non-stereotypical advertisement more, in South Africa, conservatives were still more likely to purchase a product with advertising that showed traditional gender norms. The opposite was seen in Poland, but this may have been the result of Polish conservatives fearing being viewed as sexist. Tolerance for LGBTQ imagery depends to some degree on political affiliation. Conservatives often felt a greater level of disgust and did so more frequently than liberals when viewing LGBTQ imagery, aside from lesbian imagery, which was rated similarly to heterosexual imagery. Male homosexuality can be viewed as an affront to masculinity, which might explain why female homosexuality was rated as more favorable. The portrayal of gender in advertisements can elicit emotional responses from people, and generally, heterosexual individuals prefer less overt LGBTQ imagery.

== See also ==
- Criticism of advertising
- Effects of advertising on teen body image
- Exploitation of women in mass media
- Gender Advertisements
- Killing Us Softly
- Media and gender
- Sex in advertising
