= Killing Us Softly =

American documentary series

Killing Us Softly 4: Advertising's Image of Women
- Directed by: Sut Jhally
- Based on: Lecture by Jean Kilbourne
- Produced by: Media Education Foundation
- Release date: 2010
- Running time: 45 minutes
- Country: United States
- Language: English

Killing Us Softly is an American documentary series by Jean Kilbourne, produced and distributed by the Media Education Foundation. First released in 1979 and since revised and updated three times, most recently in 2010, it focuses on images of women in advertising; in particular on gender stereotypes, the effects of advertising on women's self-image, and the objectification of women's bodies.

The two most recent updates, Killing Us Softly 3 and Killing Us Softly 4, were produced by the Media Education Foundation and directed by Sut Jhally. Using modern print and television advertisements, the films make connections between unrealistic media portrayals of women and problems such as "eating disorders, men's violence against women, and the political backlash against feminism."

== Overview ==
Kilbourne is critical of the advertising industry, accusing it of misconduct. She argues that the superficial, objectifying and unreal portrayal of women in advertising lowers women's self-esteem. Sexualized images of women are being used to sell virtually all kinds of goods, and Kilbourne argues that they degrade women, encourage abuse, and reinforce the patriarchal, sexist society. Kilbourne also draws a connection between advertising and pornography, stating that "the advertisers are America's real pornographers".

== Versions ==
Killing Us Softly and its revisions have been developed from lectures that Kilbourne has been delivering at American universities since early 1970s. The documentary has had four editions, each updating the previous release:

- Killing Us Softly: Advertising's Image of Women (1979)
- Still Killing Us Softly: Advertising's Image of Women (1987), update of the 1979 film by Margaret Lazarus and Renner Wunderlich through Cambridge Documentary Films, with Jean Kilbourne as co-creator
- Killing Us Softly 3 (1999), not to be confused with Beyond Killing Us Softly (2000), featuring Jean Kilbourne, directed by Sut Jhally, and produced by the Media Education Foundation. This update focuses on the same themes as previous versions, while also reviewing "if and how the image of women in advertising has changed over the last 20 years."
- Killing Us Softly 4 (2010), featuring Jean Kilbourne, directed by Sut Jhally, and produced by the Media Education Foundation. This update uses contemporary print and television ads to examine how women are represented in the media, noting that "the more things have changed, the more they've stayed the same."

== Reception ==
Killing Us Softly has often been used in university lectures, as well as by community organizers and feminist groups. Its various editions have been described as "extremely popular" and have attracted praise; Bakari Chavanu, for example, notes that the documentary is "an engaging and even humorous analysis of how images and ads shape our values". Ford, et al. noted that the documentary raises feminist consciousness, up to the point that it has been positively correlated with boycotts of products whose advertisements were seen as offensive.

The documentary has also evoked some negative reactions. Paul Rutherford criticized Kilbourne for a "crusade against advertising", arguing that in the documentary she is conflating pornography and erotica, not noticing the satirical and artistic values of advertising, and ignoring the influence of the world of fashion.

== Related documentaries ==
Cambridge Documentary Films created two other films on this subject; the first is Beyond Killing Us Softly: The Strength to Resist (2000). That title was updated and released as The Strength to Resist: Advertising's Impact on Women and Girls, featuring Gloria Steinem, Amy Richards, Gail Dines, Valerie Batts, Jamila Batts, Catherine Steiner Adair, and others.

== See also ==
- Effects of advertising on teen body image
- Exploitation of women in mass media
- Gender advertisement
- Miss Representation
- Sex in advertising
- Sexual objectification
