= Gender Advertisements =

1979 book by Erving Goffman

Gender Advertisements is a 1979 book by Erving Goffman.

Goffman's work has led to a number of further studies.

In Gender Advertisements, Goffman analyzes how gender is represented in the advertising to which all individuals are commonly exposed.

1. Relative Size: According to Goffman, relative size can be defined as "one way in which social weight–power, authority, rank, office, renown − is echoed expressively in social situations through relative size, especially height". With relative size, women are generally shown smaller or lower than men in terms of girth and height. Although men tend to be biologically taller or larger than females, Goffman suggests that this size difference is manipulated in man-made advertisements to convey difference in status or power in certain social situations. The concept that relative size conveys social status remains relevant even when women are portrayed as the taller or larger individual on screen or in print. Goffman states that on the few occasions when women are pictured taller than men, the men seem almost always to be subordinated in social class status and/or depicted as inferior. The tallest man, the man in front, or the man who has attention drawn to him in the advertisement is to represent strength and power, while women are often represented as weak or less significant to the advertisement.
2. Feminine Touch: Women are frequently depicted touching persons or objects in a ritualistic manner, occasionally just barely touching the object or person. Goffman argues that "females in advertising are frequently posing while "using their fingers and hands to trace the outlines of an object, or to cradle it or to caress its surface". This ritualistic touching is to be distinguished from the utilitarian kind that grasps, manipulates, or holds". This type of touch encourages the idea that women are sexually available, weak, and vulnerable in the sense of their agency, body language and individuality in relation to men.
3. Modern Shift: In today's society, we are beginning to see a shift in gender representation in the media particularly in the male fashion industry. Fashion designers are now starting to blur the lines between masculinity and femininity. In the first advertisement, the male has a very soft delicate hold on the rose compared to the typical aggressive grip men exhibit in ads. In the other two examples, both men are not only portraying the idea of feminine touch but the concept of self-touch as well.
4. Function Ranking: Goffman explains that function ranking is when men and women collaborate to complete a task, the man takes the 'executive role'. Goffman exemplifies this advertising phenomena as illustrated in the workplace, at home, in public, and with children. The idea is that women are portrayed as the lesser role in the scene, and that the men are in charge. This role is only portrayed in collaborative environments. "Two of Goffman's categories-Relative Size and Function Ranking-were not prevalent depictions in magazine advertisements. Overall, many advertisements showed only females or males rather than the two genders together or a family scene. This might mean that advertisements are frequently targeting more specific audiences." "What Erving Goffman shares with contemporary feminists is the felt conviction that beneath the surface of ordinary social behaviour innumerable small murders of the mind and spirit take place daily."
5. The Family: When families are depicted in advertising, parents are shown to be closer to their children of the same gender and in some instances men are shown separate from the rest of the family, in a protective manner. The father tends to maintain a distance with his family members. This act shows protectiveness, according to Goffman. The father is the security for the family, the protector and provider.
6. Ritualization of Subordination: Ritualization of Subordination serves to demonstrate power and superiority, or lack of, through body positioning techniques such as head cant, body cant, feminine touch, licensed withdrawal, bashful knee bend, lying down, and more. Power and superiority is typically associated with masculinity while vulnerability and objectification is usually associated with femininity.
7. Licensed Withdrawal: When a subject is pictured in an advertisement as looking away in the distance, looking down at an object, appearing lost, inattentive, hopeless, confused or upset. This often shows the person being removed from the scene itself or lost in thought. This subject can be female in most cases, but male in some as well. Scott Morris and Katherine Warren further explain this term by saying, "When women are not presented as withdrawn, they are presented as over engaged, to the point of losing control: laughing uncontrollably or overcome with extreme emotion." They also have a tendency to appear excessively in tune with their emotions and overall body language. Licensed withdrawal is found not only in advertisements, but also television shows, movies, magazines, newspapers and other media, thus amplifying the impact of the phenomenon's message.

In her 2001 work Measuring Up: How Advertising Affects Self-Image, Vickie Rutledge Shields stated that the work was "unique at the time for employing a method now being labeled 'semiotic content analysis'" and that it "[provided] the base for textual analyses ... such as poststructuralist and psychoanalytic approaches". She also noted that feminist scholars like Jean Kilbourne "[built] their highly persuasive and widely circulated findings on the nature of gender in advertising on Goffman's original categories".
