= Jean Kilbourne =

Pioneer of feminist advertising criticism

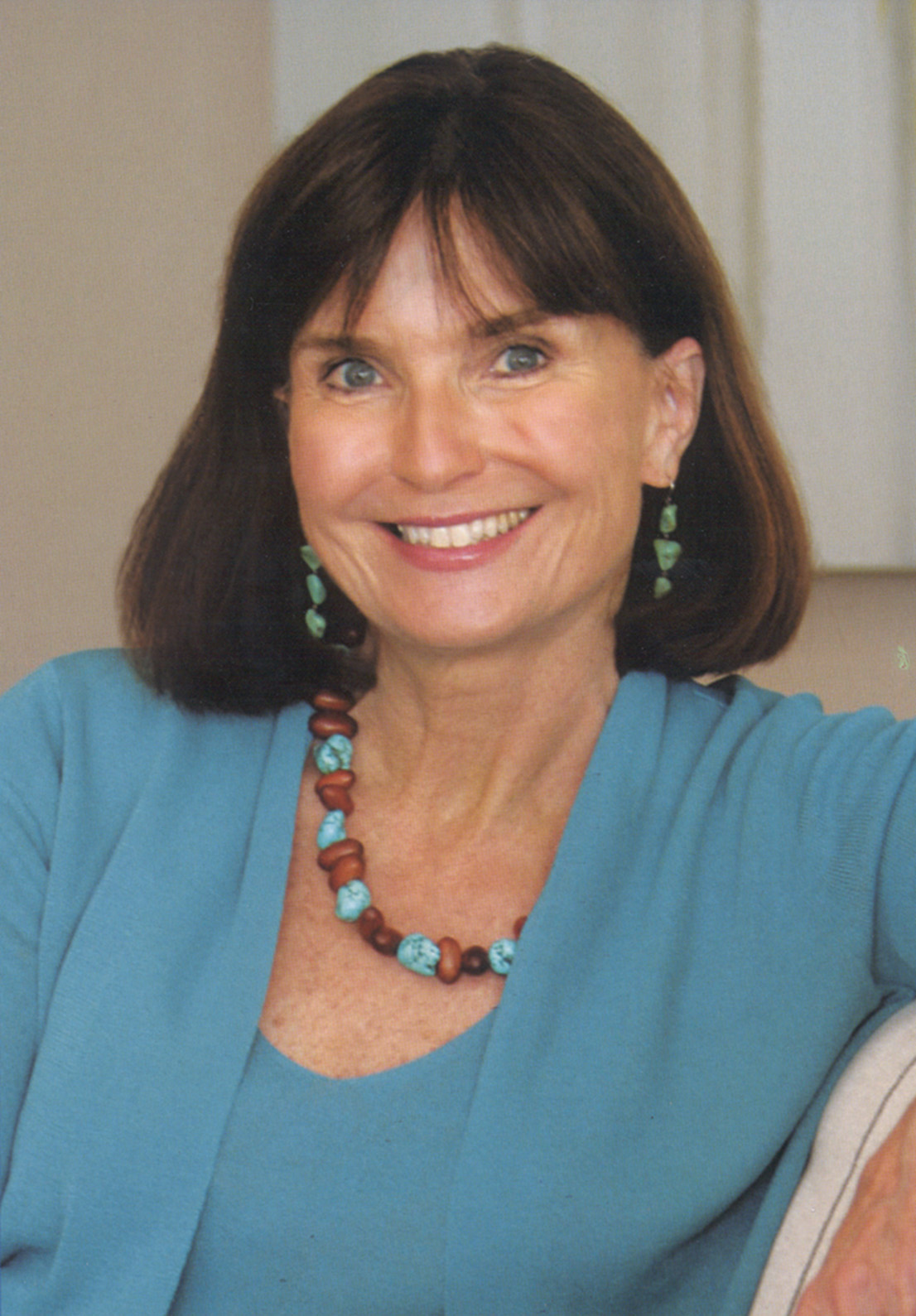
- Kilbourne in 2009
- Born: January 4, 1943 (age 83); Junction City, Kansas
- Education: Wellesley College (BA); Boston University (MA, PhD)
- Occupation: Media educator
- Spouse: Thomas Lux (divorced)
- Children: 1
- Website: JeanKilbourne.com

Jean Kilbourne (born January 4, 1943) is an American educator, former model, filmmaker, author and activist, who is known as a pioneer of feminist advertising criticism and advocacy of media literacy. In the 1970s she was one of the top three requested speakers at college campuses in Northern America.

Her 1979 documentary, Killing Us Softly, has been used in several fields of academy ranging from psychology to communications for several decades. In 2019, Jennifer Pozner said her points were more compelling than ever.

== Early life ==
Kilbourne was born in Junction City, Kansas. Her mother died when she was 9. She grew up in Hingham, Massachusetts. She started smoking when she was 13. She told Deseret News that quitting was the hardest thing she'd ever done. She graduated from Hingham High School in 1960.

== Education and career ==
Kilbourne has a Bachelor of Arts in English from Wellesley College and holds a Master of Arts and Doctorate in Education from Boston University.

At the time of her graduation from Wellesley, it was difficult for women to find jobs. Kilbourne had to work as a waitress and as a model while she attended secretarial school to find work in her field. She described her work as a model "soul-destroying," describing a culture of sexual harassment. She then obtained a job at the BBC working as a secretary. In 1969, she started teaching at Norwell High School. Upon obtaining her MA, she taught at Emerson College until 1975.

In 1968, Kilbourne saw an ad for Ovulen 21, a birth control pill, which said it worked "the way a woman thinks—by weekdays" instead of by their menstrual cycles with pictures of various stereotypical tasks for a housewife. She said the ad changed her life. She began to watch for patterns in advertisements she saw and clipped them to put on her refrigerator at home. She said she noticed a trend of advertisements demeaning to women and some were "shockingly violent." She then shifted her career from teaching to academia and educating the public about how the media shapes society.

Early in her scholarly career, Kilbourne explored the connection between advertising and several public health issues, including violence against women, eating disorders, and addiction, and launched a movement to promote media literacy as a way to prevent these problems. An idea that diverged significantly from the mainstream at the time, this approach has since become mainstream and an integral part of most prevention programs. She testified twice before the United States Congress and advised two Surgeons General of the United States on the impact of Joe Camel, a cartoon mascot for Camel brand cigarettes, on children, and other advertising around alcohol and the portrayal of women. Kilbourne said that the advertising perpetuates unrealistic, unobtainable ideals and creates a culture of violence toward women in which they are objectified and dehumanized. Kilbourne believes that addictions are a political tool.

Kilbourne was in the 2011 documentary Miss Representation.

== Public reception and impact ==
In the 1970s, Kilbourne's work pioneered the criticism of a growing trend among advertisers to objectify women, now a robust field within feminist criticism of the media. According to The New York Times Magazine and The Boston Globe, she was among the top three most popular guest lecturers on college campuses, speaking at more than half of all universities and colleges in Northern America. Her 2000 book, Can’t Buy My Love, was recognized with a Distinguished Publication Award from the Association for Women in Psychology.

In 2015, she was inducted into the National Women's Hall of Fame and received the Humanist Heroine Award from the American Humanist Association.

In 2019, 40 years after the release of her documentary Killing Us Softly, Jennifer Pozner, the director of the organization Women in Media & News, said, "Kilbourne’s main point—that advertising creates a toxic cultural environment in which sexual objectification, physical subjugation and intellectual trivialization of women has deep psychological and political resonance—is more compelling than ever." The series has been widely used in the fields of social psychology, gender studies, and communication studies since the 1980s.

=== Criticism ===
In the 2006 article "Market Feminism: The Case for a Paradigm Shift" by Linda M. Scott, Still Killing Us Softly from 1987 was criticized as being a near duplicate film from the 1979 original.

A 2012 paper calling for change in teaching materials within Women's Studies to include androgynous body types and transgender women criticized Kilbourne's work stating "by neglecting to acknowledge or critique dominant couplings of bodies and genders, Kilbourne is able to neatly flip the terms of the binary she sets up," and that "the absence of this critique is connected to her failure to interrogate the ways in which the category of women is constructed in conjunction with a host of other identity categories" such as race.

== Documentaries and publications ==
=== Filmography ===
- Killing Us Softly 4: Advertising’s Image of Women (2010)
- Deadly Persuasion: Advertising & Addiction (2004)
- Spin the Bottle: Sex, Lies, & Alcohol (2004)
- Killing Us Softly 3: Advertising’s Image of Women (2000)
- The End of Education (with Neil Postman, 1996)
- Slim Hopes: Advertising & the Obsession with Thinness (1995)
- Sexual Harassment: Building Awareness on Campus (1995)
- The Killing Screens: Media and the Culture of Violence (1994)
- Pack of Lies: The Advertising of Tobacco (1992)
- Advertising Alcohol: Calling the Shots (2nd Edition) (1991)
- Still Killing Us Softly: Advertising’s Image of Women (1987)
- Calling the Shots: Advertising Alcohol (1982)
- Killing Us Softly: Advertising’s Image of Women (1979)

=== Publications ===
- Kilbourne, Jean; Levin, Diane E. (2008). So sexy so soon: the new sexualized childhood, and what parents can do to protect their kids. New York: Ballantine Books. ISBN 9780345505071.
- Kilbourne, Jean (2000). Can't buy my love: how advertising changes the way we think and feel. New York: Simon & Schuster. ISBN 9780684866000.

Originally published as Deadly Persuasion by Simon & Schuster in 1999, won the Distinguished Publication Award from the Association for Women in Psychology.

== Personal life ==
Kilbourne dated Ringo Starr in the 1960s while she was living in London. She was in a relationship with writer Jerzy Kosiński while in graduate school, which she described as "the most important of her life." She later met poet Thomas Lux while working at Emerson. They married and they had one child before divorcing. Lux died in 2017.
