= Media and gender =

Relationship between mass media and gender

Gender and gender roles as they are represented in media reflect the social norms and value systems surrounding gender in modern society. The portrayal of gender in mediums such as film, music, video games, television, advertisements, and social media is a subject of ongoing public discourse, social activism and academic research. Femininity, masculinity, gender nonconformity, and transgender identity represent various dimensions of gender in media. Specific issues concerning gender in media include stereotyping, diversity and inclusivity, sexualization, and gender ideals.

Within sociology of gender and gender studies, representations of gender in mass media are understood to play a significant role in the social construction of gender.

== Representations of women ==
=== In film, television and gaming ===
==== Diversity and inclusion ====
With respect to the emergence of consumable media in the 21st century, the contributions to media were predominantly male. There was a precedence in representation of men. This pattern was evident across different types of film such as action, comedy, science fiction and more. The inclusion of women in film or media was often on account of the male lead's needs. The popularization of profitable media began briefly before the women's rights movement. As women began to enter the workforce, a demand for jobs in media had surfaced. Women who wanted to enter the media workforce were often faced with reluctance but deemed a necessary asset for films and media. There were disparities in pay and leading roles for women in media early on however with the growing acceptance of women in the workplace, these disparities have gotten smaller over the years. The inclusion of women in media has since been rising steadily.

2024 marked the change of a previously male dominated representation. 2024 was the first year in which there was an equal balance of male and female protagonists in film, both sitting at 42%. In 2024 the percentage of female characters in major roles sat at 39%, an increase of two percentage points from the year before, with female characters with speaking roles also increasing two points from 35% to 37% between 2023 and 2024.

There remains a disparity between the ages of men and women portrayed in film, with 16% of female characters in 2024 being over 40, and only 5% featured being over 60. 55% of male characters, on the other hand, were over 40.

==== Characterization ====
Media represents women in such ways that reinforces popular tropes. Women in film and television are often reduced to feminine stereotypes, falling into roles and tropes which service the male leads. Historically, women have often been portrayed as caretakers and love interests. Even pioneering female leads of television and cinema, such as Lucille Ball and Doris Day, are portrayed as home-makers, wives, and mothers. Overtime the film industry has been improving on varying the types of role women receive in film. Women were commonly identified in areas in film and advertisement that were stereotypically fit. These scripted representation of women negatively impact stereotypes. There has been growth and advancement in women in STEM related media as well as areas that are more male dominated.

Female characters which famously deviate from these stereotypes are Ellen Ripley, Sarah Connor and Buffy Summers. These characters are popular amongst both feminist and conservative critics, and are often cited as examples against the "Girlboss" character archetype, in which a woman is portrayed as cold, uncaring, with a disinterest in both platonic and romantic companionship, bearing similarity to traditional male action leads.

==== Appearance ====
The physical representations of women's bodies in various forms of media such as modeling, acting, and singing are often limited to slimmer body types. In popular media, women having a taller slimmer build is the standard. Representation of different body types in media that don't make that representation the central focus of the media is rare. Digital alteration is commonly used on underrepresented body types in order to better align with what is considered standard. Prominent physical appearances in media vary geographically based on cultural beauty standards. Appearances of women in children's media such as toys and movies are often emphasizing these standards. The emphasis of these beauty standards in media as well as the lack of representation when it comes to body types is related to children developing insecurities and low self-esteem around body image. Despite the unnatural effects that digital alteration has when used on bodies for media, young women often compare themselves to these portrayals.

One of the main motivations for women to appear a standard way in media is to appeal to male audiences for more profit. While women are more likely to consume content of other women no matter what, men are more likely to consume content of women they find attractive. Women are often sexualized order to appeal to the male gaze.

==== Associated tropes and criticism ====
According to a RADA interview with course director Ingrid Schiller, women were not allowed on stage until 1661. These media tropes may have roots in women's diminished presence in the writing and performance of traditional theatre. An article by Medium author Olga Loves Cinema states that comedic roles were considered "too vulgar" to be played by the 'fairer sex', and that women were included at the expense of "[suffering] beautifully".

===== Referred pain =====
The "referred pain" plot device involves women undergoing trauma, often of a violent/sexual nature, causing grief for the male lead, often inspiring a quest for vengeance. This trope is featured in such films as Mission: Impossible 2, Moulin Rouge, as well as in the Shakespeare play Titus Andronicus and books like Oroonoko.

===== The disposable woman =====
The Disposable Woman trope —also known as the Women in refrigerators trope— refers to a trope in which a woman is included in a story for the sole purpose of dying, thus putting the male protagonist through emotional development or inspiring him to embark on a revenge quest. This trope in present in films such as Braveheart, The Matrix Revolutions, The Bourne Supremacy, The Dark Knight, The Amazing Spider-Man 2, Deadpool 2, and Avengers: Infinity War.

===== Manic Pixie Dream Girl =====
The term "Manic Pixie Dream Girl" was coined in 2007 by film critic Nathan Rabin to describe a female character who exists solely "to teach broodingly soulful young men to embrace life and its infinite mysteries and adventures." The Manic Pixie Dream Girl improves the life of the male protagonist and makes him a happier and better person, but she has no apparent character arc or complex story.

===== Damsel in distress =====
A damsel in distress serves as a character in trouble who needs the assistance of a male character to get over her problems. In the Snow White and the Seven Dwarfs, after being fatally poisoned by her step mother, Snow White's seven dwarf friends mourn her death, "until a handsome prince restores her to life with a kiss." Many of Disney's fairy tale movies, portray the princesses as damsels in distress, whilst enhancing their male protagonists' masculinity, as they rescue these princesses. They are further cleaved to the stereotype of only yearning to find their true love. Similarly with the story of Sleeping Beauty where a beautiful princess cursed to sleep, can only be woken up by her true love's kiss. Even though the story gets its name from the princess, she is helpless and needs a "sword-wielding prince, bursting with testosterone, who chops his way through the forest" to kiss and wake her up from her sleep.

== Representation of men ==
=== In film, television and gaming ===
==== Characterization ====
Upon the popularization of profitable media such as video games, films, and music, the primary consumers were men. These forms of media were heavily geared towards the interests of men. The portrayal and characterization of men in such forms of media were dominant, decisive and controlling. Throughout various media platforms such as google, men are represented in a way that reinforce these male ideologies such as CEO's and heroes. Men in media are characterized to be strong both emotionally and physically.

Media plays a role in the acceptance of negative social norms men and masculinity. Masculinity is a set of ideas related to the behavior and appearance of men and boys. Most societies socialize men and boys to assume that they are superior, leader, aggressive and entitled.

Men are proportionally represented by media more often compared to women, and these portrayals often draw on sexist stereotypes. Male characters in film and television are typically tougher and more aggressive, reckless or domineering than the average man they are meant to represent.

In gender studies, the concept of hegemonic masculinity describes how cultural norms of masculinity consolidate the dominant position of men in society over women, as well as over men and others whose gender expressions fall outside this cultural ideal. According to the concept, hegemonic masculinity idealizes such traits as power, strength, bravery, virility, and competitiveness in men. Men who demonstrate hegemonic masculinity are able to assert physical, intellectual, and sexual dominance of men over others.

==== Sports and athletics ====
Media representations of sports and athletes contribute to the construction of a model of masculinity approbating strength, risk-taking, and aggression.

The UNESCO's section for Media Development and Society advocates for gender equality in sports media. "Sports coverage is hugely powerful in shaping norms and stereotypes about gender. Media has the ability to challenge these norms, promoting a balanced coverage of men's and women's sports and a fair portrayal of sportspeople – irrespective of gender". The campaign "Her Moments Matter" highlighted the fact that biased media representations of sports athletes have repercussions on women's self-confidence and the perception they have of themselves.

Advertisements often use male actors when promoting alcoholic beverages, banking services, or credit cards. When men are acting on a television commercial, they are usually performing activities such as playing sports, driving around girls, repairing cars, drinking, relaxing, and having fun.

Film historian Miriam Hansen argues the way female gaze came to film during the flapper films of the 1920s, specifically citing the famous Italian-American actor Rudolph Valentino as having been used on the screen to draw in a female audience as an embodiment of male beauty.

Following the banning of an advertisement where a wife asks pest exterminators to dispose of pests with one being her husband, CEO Fiona Jolly of the Advertising Standards Authority in Australia said in an interview that it was common for men in advertising to be portrayed as dithery and less capable compared to their partners. Gender stereotyping in British advertisements have been banned since 2017.

==== Parenting ====
A 2021 study published Psychology of Popular Media found that, of the top-rated US sitcoms from 1980 to 2017, newer sitcoms portrayed fathers as increasingly foolish, and less likely to demonstrate parenting roles. The study found that 18% of scenes in the 1980s depicted fathers as having incompetent parenting, compared to 56% in the 2010s. This is despite an increase of fathers spending an average of 2.5 hours per week in 1965 to seven hours per week in 2011 on childcare.

==== Alcohol ====
Magazines and sports broadcasts' images of masculinity are heavily influenced by the alcohol industry. In a 2005 study published in Signs: Journal of Women in Culture and Society, Michael Messner and Jeffrey Montex de Oca found that, over the late 20th century, alcohol advertisements came to portray alcohol as part of a "desirable lifestyle" for men. In the mid-1970s, women and families began to disappear from alcohol advertisementss, establishing a narrative that, rather than a family social activity, drinking was instead an activity tied to men and masculinity. Further, ads began depicting alcohol as a way for men to cover their emotions and solve or forget their problems (Kimmel 1987), creating an association between heavy alcohol consumption and a stress-free life.

== Representations of transgender and non-binary characters ==
In 1985, a U.S. non-governmental media monitoring organization called GLAAD was founded by Vito Russo, Jewelle Gomez, and Lauren Hinds with the support of other LGBT people in the media to combat media discrimination. The name "GLAAD" had been an acronym for "Gay & Lesbian Alliance Against Defamation" but is also known for its inclusivity of bisexual and transgender people.

While sexually diverse representations of people (including those who identify as transgender or non-binary) have been growing steadily in recent years, many fictionalized media representations of trans and non-binary characters are created or produced by cisgender writers. Many of these portrayals attempt to adhere to a narrative that requires a transgender character to desire to present as "passable" in order to legitimize or validate their experience as "authentic". Emphasizing the notion of passing perpetuates internalized gender expectations, resulting in a growing pressure to conform to the male gaze and what is acceptable and "passable" media representations, especially in the transfeminine community. This reinforcement of sex and gender norms is also apparent in many representations of transgender men in various media sources from magazine covers to movies and television series to social media. Each of these binarized views of gender implies that to be transgender means to transition from one end of the gender binary to the other, leaving little room for ambiguity when it comes to gender non-conformity and non-binary representations.

There is also an essentialist aspect of the narrative of desired binary-passing as a form of authenticity in that it provides an exceedingly narrow example of the many varied lived experiences of transgender individuals. In concentrating on this singular type of narrative, there is potential for media representations of gender non-conforming people who do not fit neatly into either binary category of male or female to be inadequate. In light of this, there are increasingly more depictions of non-binary, genderfluid, and genderless characters in mainstream television shows like Syd (played by Sheridan Pierce) in One Day at a Time, Crowley (played by David Tennant) in Good Omens, and Janet (played by D'Arcy Carden) in The Good Place, among a growing number of others.

Many mainstream representations of transgender and non-binary people or characters have been portrayed by cisgender actors, such as Hilary Swank's portrayal of Brandon Teena in Boys Don't Cry and Eddie Redmayne's portrayal of Lili Elbe in The Danish Girl, leading to some controversy surrounding the ethics of who should be acting the parts of trans and non-binary characters. There has also been some concern raised regarding the sensationalization or "trendiness" of transgender roles as having the potential to be exploited. Despite this, however, there are efforts being made to ensure that trans and non-binary actors are the ones being chosen to play trans and non-binary characters. Some notable examples of this are Laverne Cox's portrayal of Sophia Burset who is a trans woman in Orange is the New Black, Asia Kate Dillon playing Taylor Mason who is non-binary in Billions, and Sara Ramírez who is bisexual and non-binary and portrays the bisexual, non-binary character of Kat Sandoval in Madam Secretary.

While still marginal in numbers, there is also progress being made toward some more mainstream development of television shows created by trans and non-binary writers, such as Transparent by Joey Soloway. There are many more grassroots level efforts to produce positive transgender and non-binary representation, such as crowdfunded projects like Jen Richards' and Laura Zak's online web series Her Story.

== Gender expectations ==
Gender expectations are stereotypes about how men and women should behave in a society. Social expectations develop the minds of youth as it guides them to society's ideals of socialization, social morals and values, and gender roles.

=== Media ===
The media can be a source of gender expectations as it stereotypes individuals and groups based on specific genders and sexual preferences. Men are often portrayed as adventurous, dominant, muscular, intelligent, and sexually aggressive, while women tend to be portrayed as young, beautiful, emotionally passive, dependent, and sometimes unintelligent.

In Western media, women are expected to value youth, sexuality, and beauty, while men are taught to value dominance and power. A 2020 study of children's television found that television programs aimed at younger boys tend to promote stereotypically masculine behavior, and that male characters in such programs are more likely to reflect such norms and lack onscreen parents.

=== Music ===
In the documentary film Gaga: Five Foot Two, American singer Lady Gaga states that industry creates expectations for female artists to illustrate to the world. As she explains, "the methodology that I used to get out of that category was when they wanted me to be sexy or they wanted me to be pop; I always put some absurd spin on it that made me feel like I was still in control." Taylor Swift has shared similar comments in her documentary Miss Americana, in which many women musicians in this industry battle with the media scrutiny and toxic media culture in their daily lives, as they must be perceived as perfect and beautiful at all times.

=== Video games ===
Female characters in video games are frequently portrayed as damsels in distress, which objectifies them and relegates the narrative role to a male protagonist. For example, Princess Peach appears in fourteen of the main Super Mario series and is captured in all but one of them, to be rescued by Mario, though she plays a more central role in spinoff media. Where female characters have a major role in the narrative, they tend to be highly sexualized.

== Social media and mental health ==
In today's society, mental health issues have become directly intertwined with the use of social media. As technology continues to advance, the more access we have to different social media platforms. Social media platforms like Facebook, Instagram, Snapchat and X (formerly Twitter) are all forms of social media that allow for the user to share their lives and opinions while connecting with other users. While there are many studies that show advantages and disadvantages to social media, the statistics that link mental health issues to social media are vast.

According to "GWI 2021; We Are Social 2021", In 2021, 4.3 billion people—more than half of the world population—had a social media account, and the average user spent around two and a half hours per day on social media platforms. The rise in mental health issues is heavily linked to the increase in social media usage since the early/mid-2000s. The World Health Organization reports that in 2019, 970 million people globally were living with a mental disorder, with anxiety and depression the most common.

There are many factors of social media that negatively contribute to a person's mental health and well-being. Users often compare their appearances, and lives to others on social media. This leads to feelings of jealousy, envy, and low self-esteem. Many users also experience cyberbullying. Social media gives users the opportunity to "hide" behind their screens, making it easier to harass and bully. Another common issue that has been studied is the amount of time consumed on technology, especially social media. Regarding US statistics, California State University reports an estimated 10% or 33.19 million Americans are addicted to social media. This addiction can impact productivity, relationships and sleep, which ultimately impacts the person's mental health.

Studies have also revealed a notable gender disparity in the impacts of social media on mental well-being. Females tend to experience these mental health issues more than males. The majority of social media influencers in today's society are females and the majority of their following are young girls. The pressure that is put on both the influencers and the followers to fit a certain standard and persona results in feelings of anxiety and low self-esteem. Studies have shown that women are more likely to engage in social comparisons on social media, leading to feelings of inadequacy when measuring themselves against unattainable beauty standards perpetuated by images posted online. This can result in issues with body image and potentially eating disorders. Cyber bullying and harassment related to a woman's body is often seen on social media influencer posts.

== Societal impact ==
=== Stereotypes ===
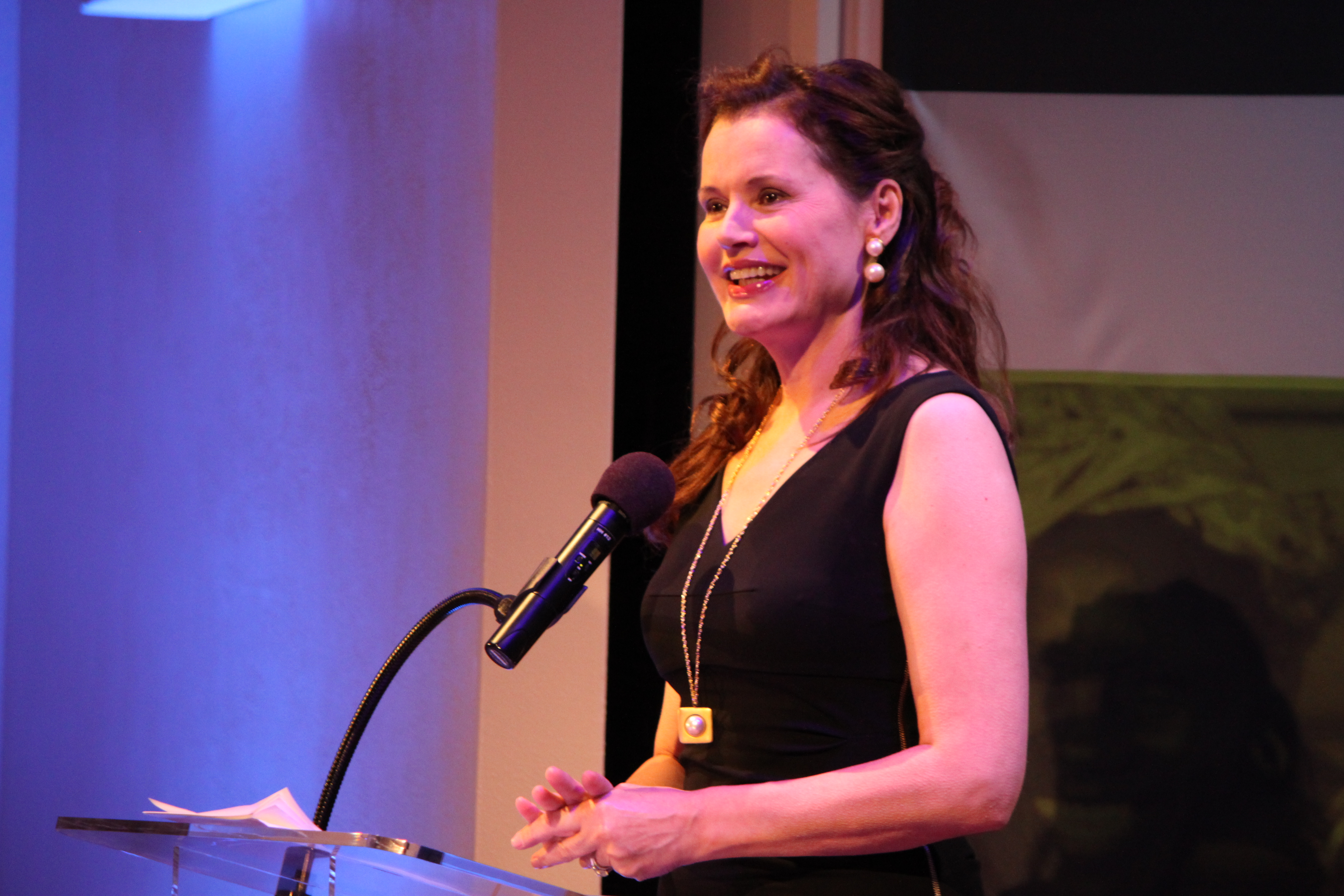
The Hollywood actress Geena Davis in a speech at the Millennium Development Goals Countdown event in the Ford Foundation Building in New York, addressing gender roles and issues in film (24 September 2013)

The media is generally regarded as playing an important role in defining prevailing social norms concerning sexual harassment, especially television, which is "widely accessible and intentionally appealing and engaging, [making] massive use of stereotypical messages that the majority of the people can easily understand". Media affects behaviors and is "of prime importance for adolescents' general ideas of romance, sex, and relationships". Thus, media has important social consequences, among which is greater acceptance of stereotypical attitudes.

In the U.S., for example, exposure to TV has been associated with "more stereotypical sexual attitudes and evaluation styles". This includes, for instance, the idea that men are sex-driven and the notion that women are sexual objects. Also prevalent is the idea that appearance or sexiness is essential for men and women. Additionally, pop music and music videos have been shown to increase stereotypical gender schemas, and promote the ideas that gender relationships are adversarial and that appearance is fundamental.

The stereotyped portrayals of men and women have been argued to be valued and internalized by younger viewers, especially during puberty and the construction of their sexual identity.

==== Advertising ====
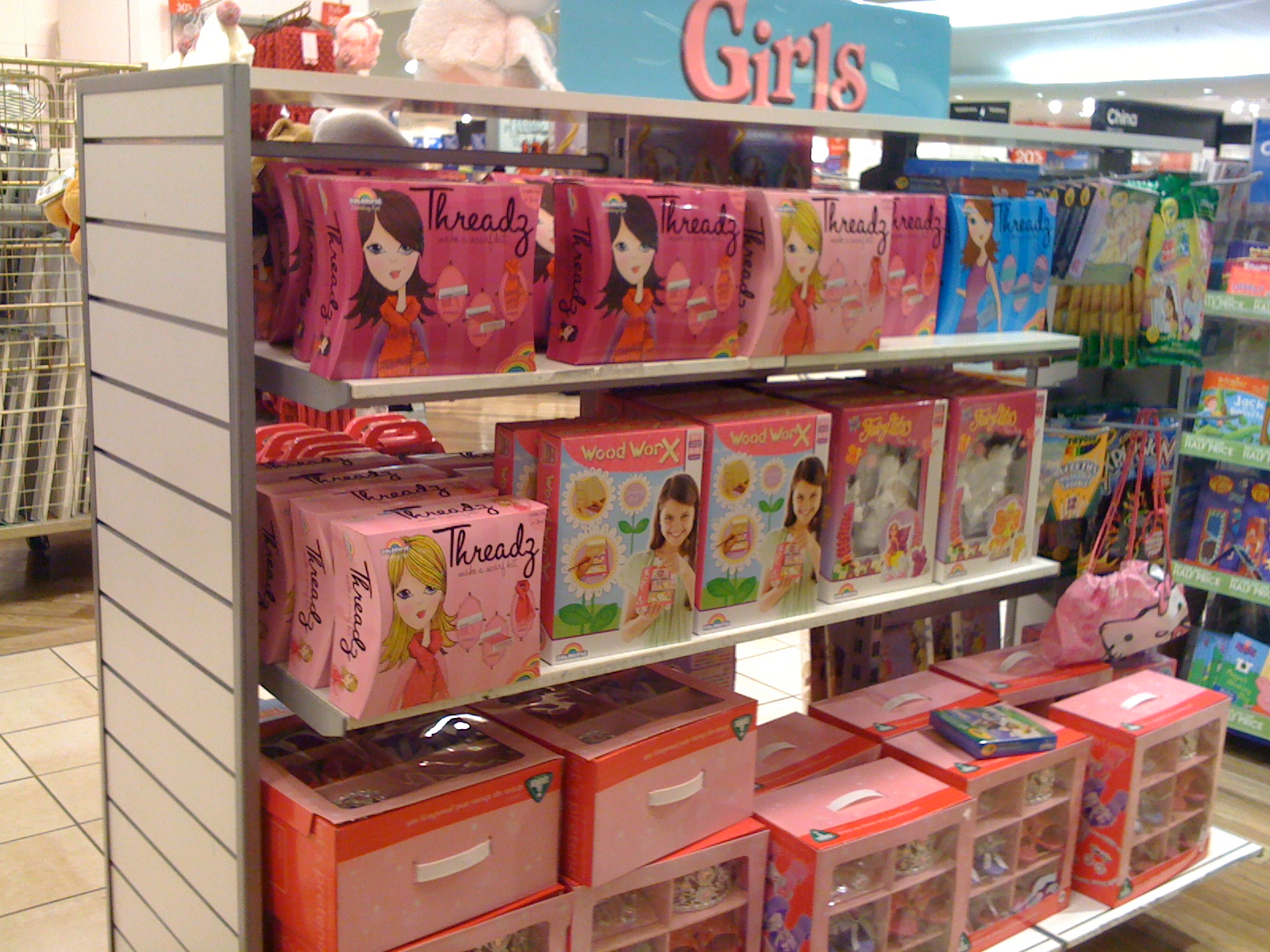
"Girls" toys as advertised in the U.K.

Gender norms are created and emphasized even at an early age through the use of visual cues which has been proven to greatly affect a child's interpretation of gender. Studies using "the gender content in an ad – characters, products, settings, role portrayals, peripheral cues (colors, language, voice-over)" have proven that a higher degree of gender flexibility has a positive correlation with children's attitudes when viewing advertisements with gender content which conveys the significance of the effects of media in advertising towards youth.

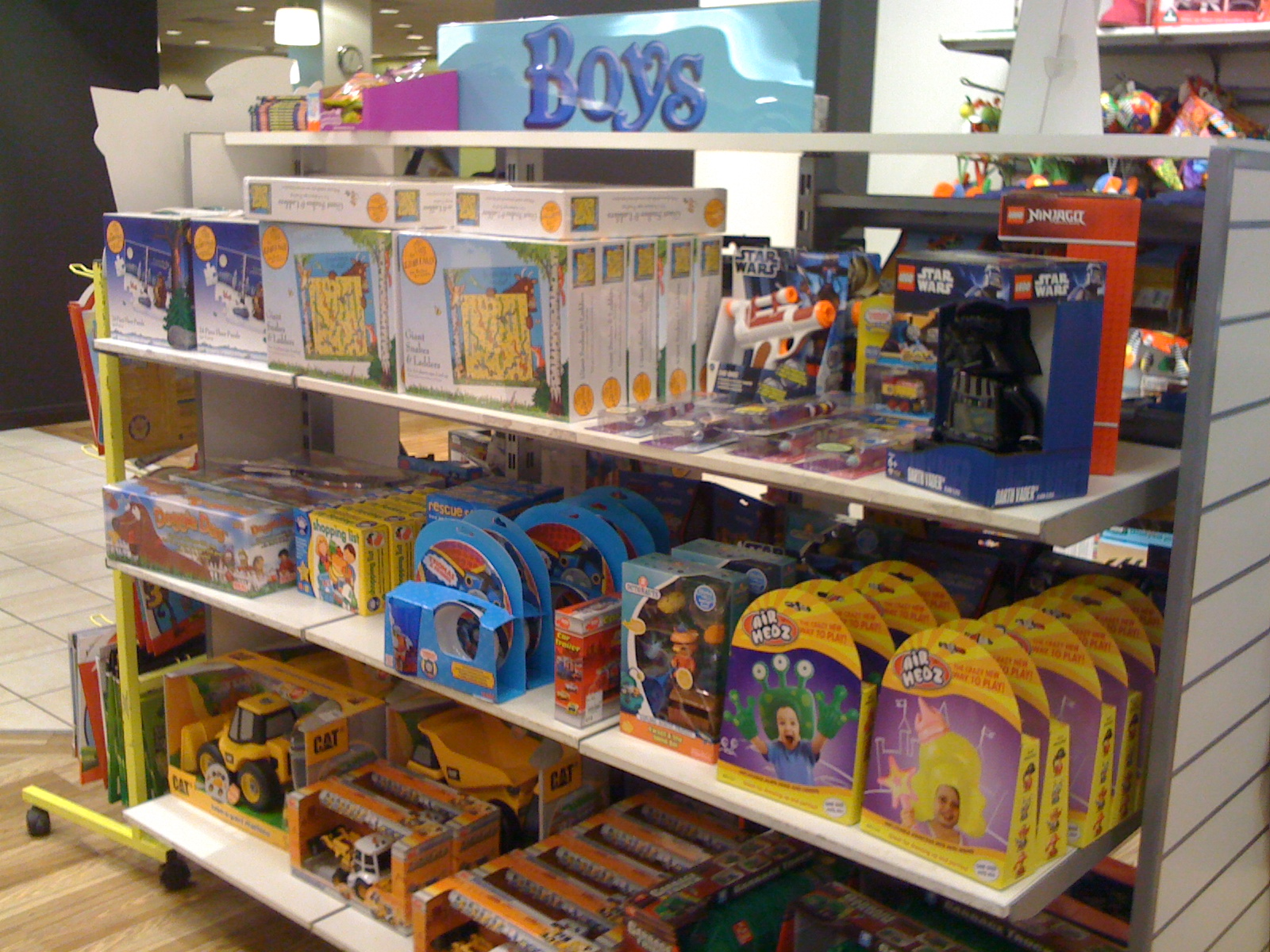
"Boys" toys as advertised in the U.K.

In the 1940s, companies began differentiating their marketing based on gender to broaden their sales and create a completely separate line of products that would be purposed for solely either a boy or a girl. These products fostered intellectual development; however, with the new gendered division of toys came the reinforcement of masculine and feminine ideals as well as a clear pink and blue colored divide. "Girl" products such as dolls and makeup foster a passive attitude and put emphasis on striving for beauty while "boy" products such as action figures and cars foster a more aggressive and active characterization. A significance behind toys is the initiation of the learning of new skills and even the initiation of curiosities behind professions. As manufacturers begin to shift towards creating a more inclusive environment and creating non-gendered products, the emergence of more gender neutral toys, dolls, and colors that puts more emphasis on personal interests instead of gender ideals is on the rise.

==== Television ====
Gender-related content has been portrayed in stereotypical ways in advertising, commercials on multiple platforms, and in Television shows.

Writer Christina Bacchilega in her book Postmodern Fairy Tales stated "Snow White" is a patriarchal frame that takes "two women's beauty as the measure of their (self)worth, and thus defines their relationship as a rivalry." In response, academic Abigail Gurvich, in "Gender Roles as Taught by Fairy Tales", states that "Snow White" could teach children that "their only worth is their appearance, and that a less attractive woman is a rival who will want to hurt them; the story enforced the ideas in the girls of the time that the only things that mattered were appearance and innocence. These are two traits that led to Snow White getting her happy ending." Fairytales continue to teach children about norms that could be harmful concerning values and self-image.

===== Film genres =====
At a young age, both girls and boys tend to direct their interests towards different film categories. Boys tend to prefer action movies, while girls tend to prefer films that contain a female protagonist.

=== Body image ===
In a 1997 Psychology Today survey, "of 3,452 women who responded... 23% indicated that movie or television celebrities influenced their body image when they were young, and 22% endorsed the influence of fashion magazine models". Some women undergoing cosmetic surgeries request specific body parts from celebrities (such as Kim Kardashian's eyes and jawline).

Body dissatisfaction and disordered eating behaviors have increased in the UK, Australia, and the US due to a "perceived environmental pressure to conform to a culturally-defined body and beauty ideal" which is promoted mainly by the media. This ideal of unrealistic and artificial female beauty is "impossible for the majority of females to achieve".

Factors involved in the composition of self-image include the emotional, physical, and reasoning aspects of a person, and these aspects affect one another.

One contributor to negative body image is the promotion of the "thin ideal" in media like commercials and magazines. From seeing images of women with extremely slender bodies, some people have an increase of negative emotions, and these individuals tend to take actions like dieting to help relieve the undesirable feelings about their body image. This act of dieting could lead to dangerous behaviors such as eating disorders if the negative perceptions about one's body image does not improve. Considering that an average North American will watch about 35,000 commercials a year, it is to be expected that commercials presenting images of skinny and gorgeous women will have a bigger impact on increasing negative body image than ads in magazines.

Although media's effect on body image has been historically primarily researched for the female gender, there have been increasingly more studies on males. The masculine ideal of a "lean, muscular mesomorphic body type" represents a minuscule portion of the population that is drastically different from the average which results in increased body dissatisfaction and low self confidence in physical attractiveness and muscle satisfaction (Hargreaves & Tiggemann, 2009). The reason for this causal relationship can be attributed towards Social Comparison Theory (Festinger, 1954) where individuals value themselves based on their performance in comparison to environmental others and Cultivation Theory (Gerbner 1969) which internalizes exposure towards the ideals presented in media.

For the LGBT population, there has been minimal research due to cisgender studies being the primary targets; however, studies have shown that LGBT youth are more likely to exhibit high body image issues than cisgender and heterosexual individuals, given that the timeline for eating disorders and body image dissatisfaction is initiated during adolescence which has a large correlation with the development of sexual orientation. Although the media causes a higher negative impact towards the LGBT population, media has also been proven to be less likely to feature gay individuals due to the "marketer's dilemma" in which companies do not want to diminish the straight consumer base.

==== Social media ====
Throughout the world, feminine and masculine ideals are construed through both the social and cultural environment. The emergence of social media creates a consumer motivation towards rapid growth in entertainment, socializing, information sharing, self-expression, and status representation resulting in both negative and positive effects.

In the chapter "Gender" from How the World Changed Social Media, the negative effects found through all nine field sites of their study foster the enforcement of gender stereotypes. For example, Southeast Turkey consists of a predominantly Muslim community in which modesty and purity are the values for women, so this population omits featuring life that does not adhere to those ideals; because social media is particularly prone to analysis, both male and females present gender segregated and conforming posts on their pages. Similarly, in rural China, it is customary for women to delete their social medias after marriage or create a portrait of traditional family and romantic values for both men and women. In Italy, the content of men's pages consist of masculine content: "politics, news, powerful motorcycles and sports" while women place emphasis on feminine content: "roles as wives and mothers". In almost every region, this chapter conveys a feminine ideal of family values and physical aesthetic while the masculine ideal is more individualized and material; however, it has also created new opportunity for the expansion of communication, female access to novel career paths, and access to the external world in the same examined regions.

There was a 115% increase in the number of cosmetic surgeries between 2000 and 2018, possibly because social media distorts how teenagers see themselves, and many surgeons report that looking better in selfies on social media posts is an incentive for patients.

Social media has been used to promote political stances, such as in the referendum to appeal Ireland's eighth amendment. In this case, gender issues were brought to the forefront of social media as a way to transgress politics and push traditionally private female issues into the public. With feminist grassroots organizations, such as Together for Yes, using social media as their primary tool to communicate about abortion laws, the referendum result is viewed as victory for feminist tweeters and a positive outcome of using gender effectively on social media.

=== Sexualization and objectification ===
The objectification of women, both sexually and non-sexually, is prevalent in various media forms such as advertising, television, movies, music videos, video games, and magazines. Sexual objectification, in particular, has received extensive attention in literature, with studies indicating its commonality and negative effects on well-being. This type of representation often portrays women as mere objects of desire, contributing to the perpetuation of sexism and the acceptance of rape myths (Rudman and Mescher 2012). Exposure to sexualized media content has been consistently linked to body dissatisfaction, distorted attitudes about eating, and support for sexist beliefs and behaviors (Frederick et al., 2022).

While research has primarily focused on women, there is evidence suggesting that men are also affected by objectification, albeit through different pathways. Men may experience pressures related to body image from media representations, leading to issues such as body surveillance and dissatisfaction. Additionally, there are specificities related to sexual orientation, with LGBTQ+ individuals facing unique challenges regarding media objectification.

Studies show that the objectification and sexualization of women can also affect the cognitive processes of the people who come in contact with it. "Aubrey and Taylor (2009) reported that undergraduate men exposed to magazine images of sexualized women expressed less confidence in their own romantic capabilities than did men without this exposure". Schooler (2015) found that when viewing sexually objectified pictures of women, the part of the brain that is activated is not the one that recognizes humans but instead is the part that recognizes objects; supporting this, Bernard, et al. 2015, found that objectified women's body parts were better recognized than the body as a whole, consistent with object recognition.

== Global perspectives ==
While much of the scholarship on media and gender has focused on Western contexts—particularly the United States and Europe—gender representation in media varies significantly across global regions, shaped by distinct cultural, religious, and political dynamics. For instance, in many South Asian countries, media portrayals of gender are often influenced by traditional norms surrounding family, modesty, and social roles. Bollywood films, for example, have long been critiqued for simultaneously reinforcing patriarchal ideals while also creating space for female agency in more recent narratives.

In parts of the Middle East and North Africa, state-controlled media and conservative societal structures often limit how gender can be represented publicly. However, digital platforms have enabled female creators and activists to challenge dominant narratives. In contrast, East Asian media industries, such as South Korea and Japan, present complex and contradictory gender images—ranging from highly sexualized portrayals to the emergence of androgynous idols and feminist counter-narratives.

In many Sub-Saharan African countries, local radio remains a key medium for gender discourse, especially in rural areas. Community-based media initiatives have been instrumental in promoting women's health, education, and political participation, though access and control remain uneven.

== Feminist response ==
In the 1970s, TV critics, academics, and women started to point out the way TV shows portrayed female characters. TV Guide magazine called out the industry for "refusing to rise above characterizations of women as pretty, skinny, dopey, hapless housewives or housewife wannabes", and a poll conducted by Redbook magazine in 1972 showed that "75 per cent of 120,000 women agreed that 'the media degrades women by portraying them as mindless dolls'". In that sense, The Mary Tyler Moore Show was a television breakthrough because it introduced the first female character whose central relationships were not her husband or boyfriend or her family, but her friends and coworkers. The main character was a sort of stand-in for the "new American female" who put her job before romance and preferred to be alone than with the wrong men, but still had to do stereotypically female office work (like typing and getting coffee) and didn't speak up to her boss and other male coworkers.

Germaine Greer, Australian-born author of The Female Eunuch (1970), offered a systematic deconstruction of ideas such as womanhood and femininity, arguing that women are forced to assume submissive roles in society to fulfill male fantasies of what being a woman entails. Greer wrote that women were perceived as mere consumers benefiting from the purchasing power of their husband. Women become targets for marketing, she said, and their image is used in advertising to sell products. American socialist writer and feminist, Sharon Smith wrote on the first issue of Women and Film that women's roles in film "almost always [revolve] around her physical attraction and the mating games she plays with the male characters" in contrast to men's roles, which according to the author are more varied. In 1973 Marjorie Rosen, an important contributor to feminist film theory, argued that "the Cinema Woman is a Popcorn Venus, a delectable but insubstantial hybrid of cultural distortions". In 1978 Gaye Tuchman wrote of the concept of symbolic annihilation, blaming the media for imposing a negative vision of active women and making an apologia for housewives.

From media representations, feminists paved the way for debates and discussions about gender within the social and political spheres. In 1986, the British MP Clare Short proposed a bill to ban newspapers from printing Page 3 photographs of topless models.

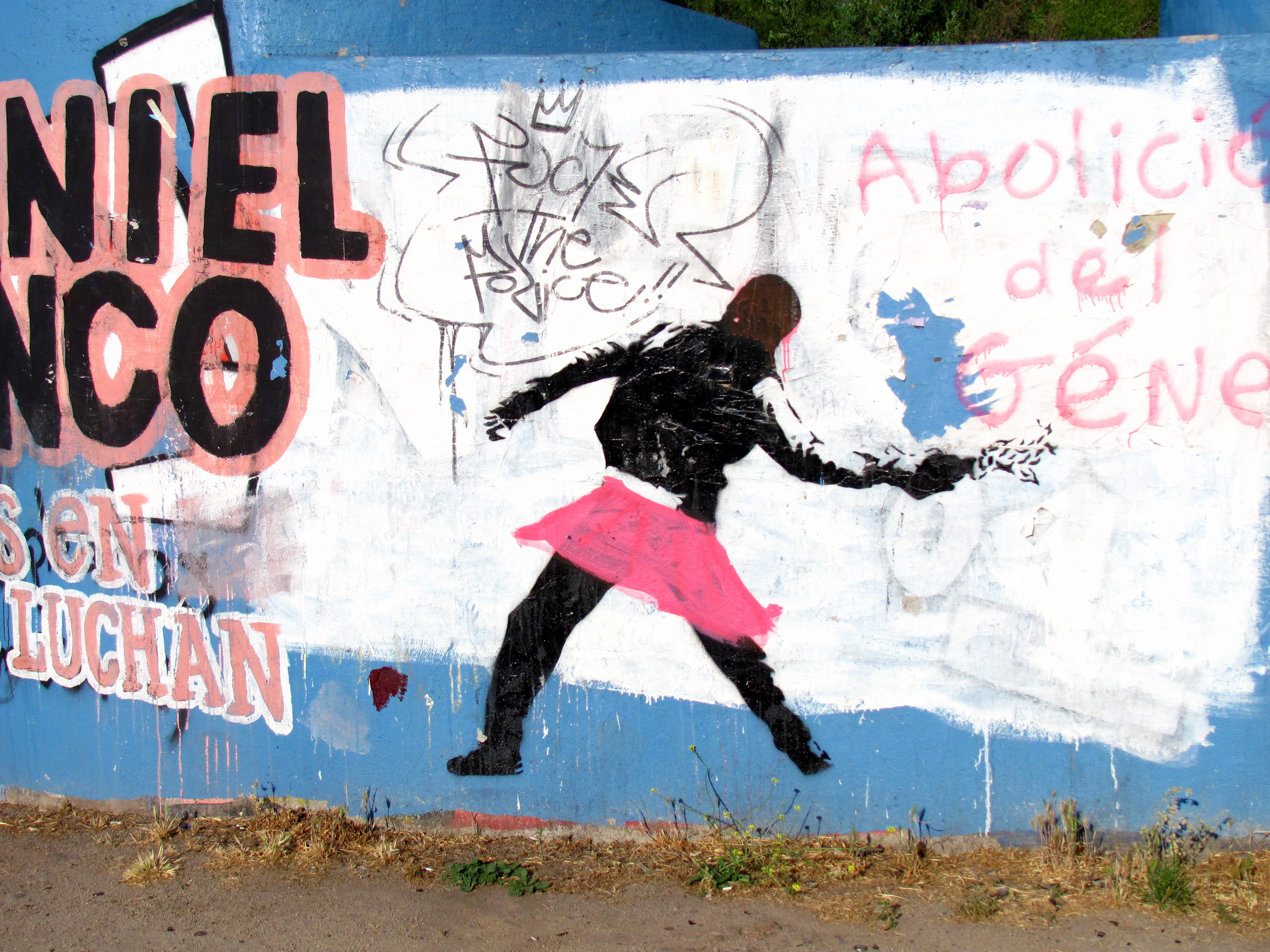
Media advocation for abolition of gender

In the early 2000s, feminist critics began analyzing film in terms of the Bechdel test. This feminist assessment of cinema was named after Alison Bechdel, feminist cartoonist and creator of the long-running comic strip Dykes to Watch Out For. This test determines the level of gender equality present in a film by assessing whether a work of fiction features at least two named women who talk to each other about something other than a man.

== Organizations ==
=== UN Women ===
UN Women is the UN organization dedicated to gender equality and the empowerment of women. To increase women's leadership, to end violence against women and to engage women in all aspects of peace and security processes, it's important to give women the right place in media landscape, and their representations must be fair and equal. UN Women supports media monitoring studies on how women are depicted in the media. For instance, the organization engage media professionals by raising awareness of gender equality and violence against women, including through special workshops and tool-kits, to encourage gender-sensitive reporting." Launched by UN Women in 2014, HeForShe is a movement seeking to involve men in achieving gender equality. Its launch gained significant media profile, with its hashtag being tweeted 1.1 million times in two weeks.

=== UNESCO ===
In line with UNESCO's Global Priority Gender, "UNESCO is contributing to achieving full gender equality in the media by 2030". To reach this goal, the Organization developed the Gender-sensitive Indicators for Media (GSIM) to measure gender awareness and portrayal within media organizations (e.g. working conditions), but particularly in editorial content. The Organization has been promoting their application by governments, media organizations, journalists unions and associations, journalism schools and the like. They set the basis for gender equality in media operations and editorial content. In addition, each year, UNESCO organizes a campaign named "Women Make the News"; in 2018 the theme was Gender Equality and Sports Media as "Sports coverage is hugely powerful in shaping norms and stereotypes about gender. Media has the ability to challenge these norms, promoting a balanced coverage of men's and women's sports and a fair portrayal of sportspeople irrespective of gender."

=== The #MeToo Movement ===
The #MeToo movement gained traction in 2017 on all social media platforms as a way for people to share their stories of sexual assault, sexual harassment and rape. The phrase "Me too" was started by activist Tarana Burke in 2006. Alyssa Milano brought the phrase back in 2017 because she wanted to show society the extent of the issues with sexual harassment. On October 15, 2017, she tweeted "If you've been sexually harassed or assaulted write 'me too' as a reply to this tweet." As a result of this, the #MeToo campaign soon spread across 85 countries with 1.7 million tweets. This movement displayed the thousands of people that have been victims of some form of sexual harassment. "Me too" gives victims the space to share their experiences and show them that they are not alone. The media has played a crucial role in amplifying the message by providing a platform for survivors to share their stories, have open conversations and raise awareness all over the world.

Given its popularity in social media, the movement MeToo has empowered many women in Western countries to break their silence on traumatic events. Women felt more encouraged to share their stories, therefore helping reduce stigma around sexual harassment. Because of the MeToo movement and its traction on the media, society is able to have a more open conversation about consent. There are now many support groups and resources for people who may have been victims of sexual harassment, sexual assault and/or rape culture.

=== Nonprofit organizations ===
Some nonprofit organizations specialize in topics related to gender and media. These include:

- Alliance for Women in Media (AWM)
- The Geena Davis Institute
- International Women's Media Foundation
- Women's Media Center
- Women's Media Group (WMG)

== See also ==
- Ageing studies
- Bisexual literature
- Exploitation of women in mass media
- Femininity in advertising
- Gender representation in video games
- Himbo
- Media bias
- Language and gender
- Portrayal of women in comics
