= Effects of advertising on teen body image =

The effects of advertising on teen body image have been studied by researchers, ranging from psychologists to marketing professionals. While many factors, such as "parenting, education, [and] intimate relationships" also affect body image, "the media and body image are closely related." This is because thousands of advertisements contain messages about physical attractiveness and beauty, examples of which include commercials for clothes, cosmetics, weight reduction, and physical fitness. Researchers have conducted studies in an attempt to see if such advertisements have effects on teenage body image, and what those effects might be.

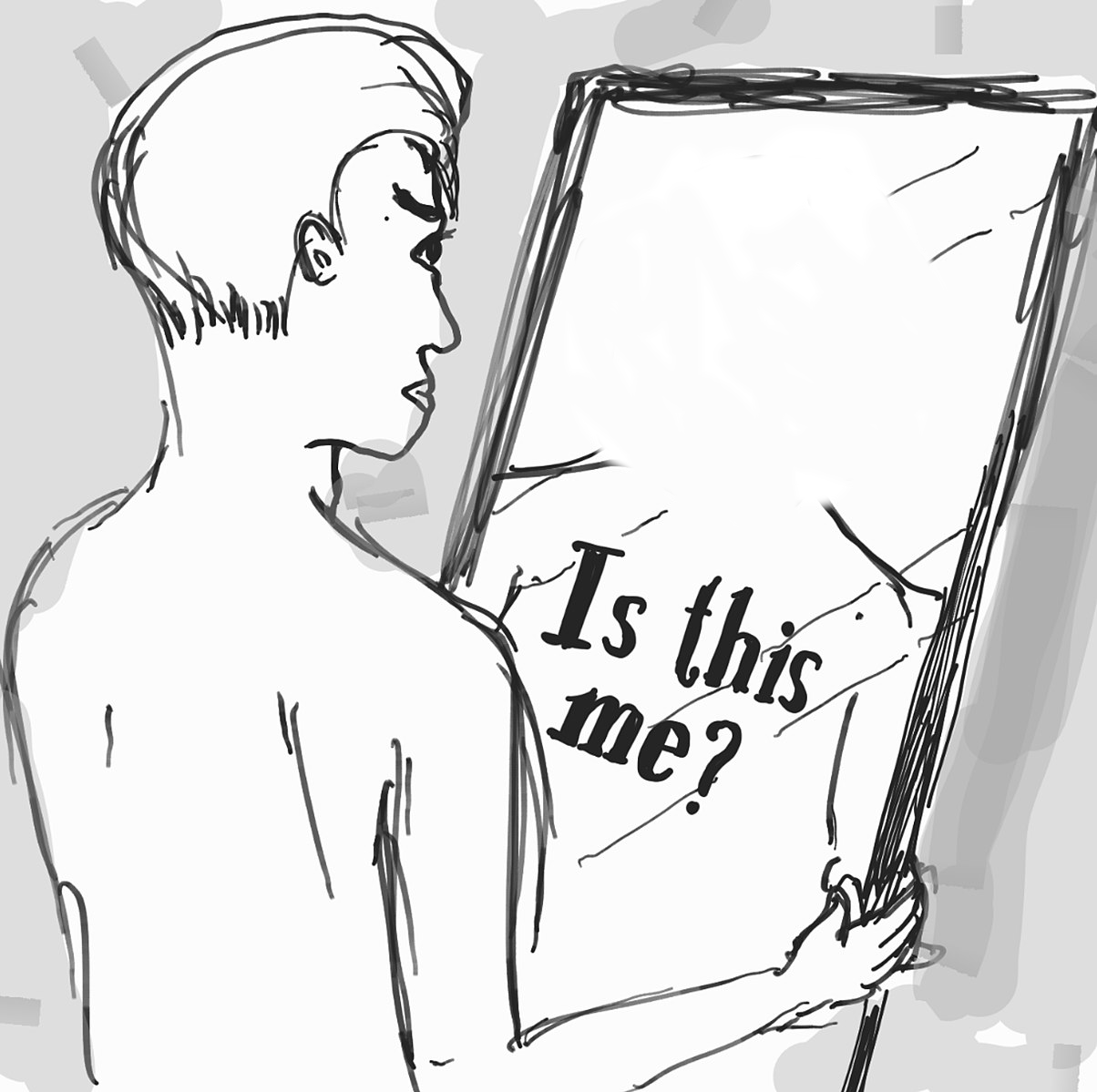
Illustrating how an unidentified gender teenager experiencing body image issues looks in the mirror. Sometimes those with body image issues do not see the size they really are in the mirror.

Researchers, such as Mary Martin and James Gentry, have found that teen advertising reduces teenagers' self-esteem by setting unrealistic expectations for them about their physical appearances through the use of idealized models. Other researchers, such as Heidi Posavac, acknowledge this, but believe that this only applies to teenagers who already possess low self-esteem or a poor self-image.

In contrast, researchers, including Terry Bristol, have found teenagers to be generally unaffected by these advertisements due to the idea that repeated exposure can create immunity to images and messages in advertisements. Moreover, some researchers, such as Paul Humphreys, have concluded that exposure to such advertisements can create higher self-esteem in teenagers.

== Background ==
According to Medimark Research Inc., a marketing research company, teenagers are important to marketers because they "have significant discretionary income; spend family money, as well as influence their parents' spending on both large and small household purchases; establish and affect fashion, lifestyle, and overall trends; and provide a 'window' into our society – a view of how it is now and what it is likely to become."

Almost half of the space of the most popular magazines for adolescent girls is made up of advertisements. To further reach young men with advertisements, branded content is now being included in video games as well. Researchers are trying to determine whether or not these advertisements have an effect on the body image and self-esteem of the teenagers that view them.

== Negative effects ==
=== Effects on society ===
The way beauty is portrayed in the media tends to cause dissatisfaction and negative thoughts about ourselves when those results are not achieved. Sociocultural standards of feminine beauty are presented in almost all forms of popular media that are bombarding women with these unrealistic images that portray what is considered to be the "ideal body" within this society. Such standards of beauty are unattainable for most women; The majority of the models displayed on television and in advertisements are well below what is considered healthy body weight. Mass media's use of such unrealistic models sends an implicit message that for a woman to be considered beautiful, she must be unhealthy. The mindset that a person can never be "too rich or too thin" is prevalent in society, and this makes it difficult for women and girls to achieve any level of contentment with their physical appearance. There has been a plethora of research to indicate that women are negatively affected by constant exposure to models that fulfill the unrealistic media ideal of beauty.

Naomi Wolf's The Beauty Myth noted the beginning of feminist critiques of societal standards regarding female beauty. This "feminine ideal" is the goal of most women in society, although feminists have been working for decades on eradicating this idea (Brownmiller, 1984). The first feminist mass meeting in 1914 included demands such as the 'right to ignore fashion and the 'right not to have to wear makeup. (Bordo, 1993). unfortunately these demands have not yet been fulfilled as women in today's society still feel the need to dress in a particular way and to wear makeup to feel beautiful to the opposite gender and within today's society.

However, these efforts to erase the 'ideal body image' are opposed by modern reality TV shows that encourage such behavior. Extreme Makeover puts individuals through extreme physical changes to change the way they look, which is then viewed by women of all ages. This tends to encourage people to think about their image and change what they do not like in an unsafe manner. The Swan (2004) went one step further and had the contestants compete in a beauty contest following their various reconstructive surgeries. These types of TV shows tend to teach women that it is okay to change their image to fit the "feminine ideal", instead of encouraging them to accept the body that they already have.

Rice (1994) states that a woman's essential value is based on her ability to attain a thin body size'. Therefore, while women continue to diet, they still dislike their bodies. Another statistic, stated by the Media Awareness Network, is that the average model weighed 8 percent less than the average woman twenty years ago, compared to models weighing 23 percent less today.

The mass media portrays society's standard of beauty through female models that appear to be tall, physically attractive, and visibly thin. Advertising will rarely portray women that deviate outside of these characteristics, and when it does, societal standards don't consider them to be the “typical” model seen in mainstream media. Society places value on women appearing “skinny” and maintaining a low body weight. A study by Katzmarzyk and Davis conducted over two decades on Playboy models found that 70% of the women were underweight and “greater than 75% of the women were less than 85% of their ideal body weight” (Katzmarzyk and Davis).

=== Effects on women and girls ===
A study by A. Chris Downs and Sheila Harrison from Sex Roles found that one out of every 3.8 television commercials has a message about attractiveness in it. They determined that viewers receive roughly 5,260 advertisements related to attractiveness per year (or at least 14 per day). Of these messages, 1,850 of them are specifically about beauty.

In a study published in the Journal of Advertising, Marketing professors Mary Martin and James Gentry noted that images of blonde, thin women are predominant in mass media and that these characteristics are often portrayed as being ideal. Martin and Gentry also found that advertising can "impose a sense of inadequacy on young women's self-concepts". This is because girls and young women tend to compare their physical attractiveness to the physical attractiveness of models in advertisements. They then experience lowered self-esteem if they do not feel that they look like the models in advertisements.

Today's models weigh 23 percent less than the average woman, while the average model two decades ago weighed eight percent less than the average woman. This currently prevalent media ideal of thinness is met by only about five percent of the population.

Additionally, a study of Seventeen magazine concluded that the models featured in this popular teen magazine were far less curvy than those portrayed in women's magazines. It was also noted that the hip-to-waist ratio had decreased in these models from 1970 to 1990.

In a study published in Sex Roles, psychologists Heidi Posavac, Steven Posavac, and Emil Posavac found that many young women will express dissatisfaction with their bodies, particularly with their body weight, when they are exposed to images of thin models who are slimmer than the average woman. Early researchers in the area of sex roles in the mass media examined a large number of ads at a time in order to classify and count particular types of representation (Rakow 1986).

Expressing similar sentiments, an aspiring young model was quoted as saying, "Deep down I still want to be a supermodel... As long as they're there, screaming at me from the television, glaring at me from the magazines, I'm stuck in the model trap. Hate them first. Then grow to like them. Love them. Emulate them. Die to be them. All the while praying the cycle will come to an end."

Academic researchers Philip Myers Jr. and Frank Biocca concluded, in their study published in the Journal of Communication, that a woman's self-perceived body image can change after watching a half-an-hour of television programming and advertising. Researchers Yoku Yamamiya and Thomas F. Cash concluded through their study that "Even a 5 minute exposure to thin-and-beautiful media images results in a more negative body image state than does exposure to images of neutral object."

Likewise, a study by Stice et al. in the Journal of Abnormal Psychology concluded that there is a direct relationship between the amount of media exposure that a young woman has and the likelihood that she will develop eating disorder symptoms.

There is a correlation between the portrayal of unrealistic body types in the media and the development of poor body image among men and women. Social comparison theory helps to explain why people are comparing themselves to what they see around them. This is largely seen through the comparison of oneself to what is seen in the media. Comparison to attractive targets is “contributing to the internalization of a ‘thin’ ideal and mediates the effects of media on body dissatisfaction". A study conducted by Harrison and Cantor found that media use predicted disordered-eating symptomatology, drive for thinness, and body dissatisfaction. The comparison of one's physical appearance to what is displayed in the media is one factor that can lead to poor body image and thus can cause the desire to change one's appearance to look more similar to the unrealistic depictions of bodies in the media.

Martin and Gentry also found that the mass media "creates and reinforces a preoccupation with physical attractiveness in young women", which can lead to bulimia, anorexia, and opting for cosmetic surgery. She also concluded that, "exposure to ultra-thin models in advertisements and magazine pictures produced depression, stress, guilt, shame, insecurity, and body dissatisfaction in female college students".

In a study published in the Journal of Youth and Adolescence, Paxton et al. found body dissatisfaction to be more prevalent in young women than in young men.

Low self-esteem that stems from teenage advertising can have detrimental effects on teenagers. Seventy-five percent of young women with low self-esteem report engaging in negative activities such as "cutting, bullying, smoking, or drinking when feeling bad about themselves".

Teen promiscuity is another possible effect of low self-esteem.

People fail to recognize that photo-shop is widely used on models in magazines and in advertisements which gives an unrealistic expectation. An online survey in 2010 consisting of 100 girls aged 13–17 was conducted by Girl Scouts. What they found was that 9 out of 10 girls felt pressure from the fashion and media industries to be skinny. More than 60% compared themselves to fashion models, and 46% believed that the ideal body image is portrayed in fashion magazines and referred to the girls in the magazines as who they strive to look like.

Unfortunately, thin-idealized bodies are attributed with self-control, success, and discipline, and therefore proclaimed as being desirable and socially valued. “Being slim means resisting the temptations that surround consumers in countries of overabundance and wealth” (Thompson et al. 1995: Halliwell et al. 2004).

=== Effects on men and boys ===
It is more prevalent that young men are more self-conscious and are showing great concern for their bodies. This indicates a huge awareness of both self-appearance and importance to the body itself. In other words, young men tend to be worried about their figures just like young women are. This is present due to the media and the messages it commonly portrays; these messages are mostly targeted toward a younger age group which shows how media has influenced these age groups. According to an online article, it states that "The male body in the media has an impact on how males, especially developing males, perceive their bodies," said Brennan. "Males are being exposed to the same extreme ideals of body perfection as females."

A study published in JAMA Pediatrics in January shows concerns about physique and muscularity in particular, among young males are "relatively common". The researchers said approximately 18 percent of participants in their study (which included 5,527 males) were "extremely concerned for their weight and researchers found 7.6 percent of young males were "very concerned about muscularity" and were using techniques that could be harmful to obtain an ideal body.

A study by the insurer Blue Cross Blue Shield found that from 1999 to 2000, the use of steroids and similar drugs amongst boys ages 12 to 17 jumped 25 percent, with 20 percent saying they use the drug for looks rather than sports.

Moreover, men in advertisements are more muscular today than they were 25 to 30 years ago.

A 2002 study found that male college students who are exposed to advertisements featuring muscular men show a significant "discrepancy between their own perceived muscularity and the level of muscularity that they ideally wanted to have".

Additionally, a study from the Journal of Social and Clinical Psychology by Daniel Agliata and Stacey Tantleff-Dunn found that exposure to media images of lean and muscular men increases muscle dissatisfaction and depression in young men.

Some researchers believe that men are usually more satisfied than women with their physical appearance. Other researchers, however, state that men still struggle with body image. Men believe that they are either too thin or too heavy and therefore do not meet the male ideal body type of lean and muscular.

Since boys are much less likely to discuss their issues about their body image, the statistics about the number of boys whom this affects vary because so many instances are unreported. Therefore, it is difficult to precisely determine which gender is more affected by body portrayal in the media. One very thorough study, however, conducted by Alison Field, a professor of pediatrics at Harvard Medical School and a researcher at Boston Children's Hospital, revealed that approximately 18% of adolescent boys, aged 10–17, are concerned about their body and how much they weigh. Furthermore, Frederick and Jamal Essay from the University of Hawaii at Manoa conducted national online surveys and gathered information from 116,000 men. They concluded that approximately 29% of men were dissatisfied with their bodies specifically because of the media.

== Positive and neutral effects ==
=== Effects on teenagers ===
Heidi Posavac, Steven Posavac, and Emil Posavac found that young women who are already content with their bodies are generally unaffected by media images of models and other attractive women. They concluded that only those who are dissatisfied with their bodies prior to viewing advertisements tend to feel worse afterward when exposed to thin, idealized models.

Myers and Biocca similarly found that some young women actually report feeling thinner after viewing advertisements featuring thin, idealized women.

A study by psychology professors Paul Humphreys and Susan Paxton suggests that young men who view images of idealized male bodies either feel no different or feel more positive about themselves after viewing such images.

Research from Tamara Mangleburg and Terry Bristol's, featured in the Journal of Advertising, found that teens are not typically swayed by images in advertisements. They suggest the more teens view advertisements, the less they are affected by them and the more they become skeptical of the messages that are within them. This may be due to repeated exposure helping teens better recognize the persuasive motives behind advertising.

Marsha Richins, former president of the Association for Consumer Research, similarly theorized that by late adolescence the sight of extremely attractive models becomes "old news" and is unlikely to influence self-perception. Supporting this, Yamamiya and Cash found that when viewers were shown more than ten model images in a short period, they were less influenced by them, likely due to habituation.

Psychological researchers Christopher Ferguson, Benjamin Winegard, and Bo Winegard argue that the media's effects on body dissatisfaction have been exaggerated. Their findings suggest that, peers, not media have a much greater influence in terms of body dissatisfaction in teenagers.
