= Relationship between child pornography and child sexual abuse =

Link between viewing child pornography and perpetration of child sexual abuse

A range of research has been conducted examining the link between viewing child pornography and perpetration of child sexual abuse, and much disagreement persists regarding whether a causal connection has been established. Perspectives fall into one of three positions:

- Viewing child pornography increases the likelihood of an individual committing child sexual abuse. Reasons include that the pornography normalizes and/or legitimizes the sexual interest in children, as well as that pornography might eventually cease to satisfy the user.
- Viewing child pornography decreases the likelihood of an individual committing child sexual abuse. Reasons are that the pornography acts as a substitute for actual offenses. Simulated child pornography is suggested as an alternative so that real children are not harmed.
- There is no correlation between viewing child pornography and acts of child sexual abuse, or that available evidence is insufficient to draw any conclusions at all.

== Views on increasing criminal sexual intent ==
=== General ===
One perspective is that exposure to child pornography promotes criminal sexual intent that otherwise would not exist. The promotion may take place via material that legitimizes sexual interest in minors. Anonymity (or belief that anonymity exists) may further loosen the internal restraints, facilitated by still or moving images, which makes actual criminal sexual behavior with children more probable if the person was already sexually motivated toward children, or, by creating new sexual interests in children. A review article states that these are plausible hypotheses, but that there is a lack of clarity as to the general applicability of these mechanisms. The authors also note that, "among some groups of predisposed individuals, easy access to a wide variety of engrossing and high-quality child pornography could serve as a substitute for involvement with actual victims".

According to the National District Attorneys Association of America, "In light of the documented link between individuals who view child pornography and individuals who actually molest children, each child pornography case should be viewed as a red flag to the possibility of actual child molestation." John Carr, founding member of the United Kingdom Home Secretary's Internet Task Force on Child Protection, in a report published by the NCH stated, "Many pedophiles acknowledge that exposure to child abuse images fuels their sexual fantasies and plays an important part in leading them to commit hands-on sexual offenses against children."

=== Research ===
A 1987 report by the US National Institute of Justice described "a disturbing correlation" between traders of child pornography and acts of child molestation. A 2008 longitudinal study of 341 convicted child molesters in America found that pornography's use correlated significantly with their rate of sexually re-offending. Frequency of pornography use was primarily a further risk factor for higher-risk offenders, when compared with lower-risk offenders, and use of highly deviant pornography correlated with increased recidivism risk for all groups. The majority of men who have been charged with or convicted of child pornography offenses show pedophilic profiles on phallometric testing. A study with a sample of 201 adult male child pornography offenders using police databases examined charges or convictions after the index child pornography offense(s). 56% of the sample had a prior criminal record, 24% had prior contact sexual offenses, and 15% had prior child pornography offenses. One-third were concurrently charged with other crimes at the time they were charged for child pornography offenses. 17% of the sample offended again in some way during this time, and 4% committed a new contact sexual offense. Child pornography offenders with prior criminal records were significantly more likely to offend again in any way during the follow-up period. Child pornography offenders who had committed a prior or concurrent contact sexual offense were the most likely to offend again, either generally or sexually.

According to the Mayo Clinic of the US, studies and case reports indicate that 30% to 80% of individuals who viewed child pornography and 76% of individuals who were arrested for Internet child pornography had molested a child; however, they state that it is difficult to know how many people progress from computerized child pornography to physical acts against children and how many would have progressed to physical acts without the computer being involved.

A study conducted by psychologists at the American Federal Bureau of Prisons has concluded that "many Internet child pornography offenders may be undetected child molesters", finding a slightly higher percentage of molesters among child pornography offenders than the Mayo Clinic study, though they also "cautioned that offenders who volunteer for treatment may differ in their behavior from those who do not seek treatment." The study was withdrawn by Bureau officials from a peer-reviewed journal which had accepted it for publication, due to concerns that the results might be misinterpreted. Some researchers argued that the findings "do not necessarily apply to the large and diverse group of adults who have at some point downloaded child pornography, and whose behavior is far too variable to be captured by a single survey". Child protection advocates and psychologists like Fred Berlin, who heads the National Institute for the Study, Prevention and Treatment of Sexual Trauma, expressed disapproval over the failure to publish the report.

One study suggests that child pornography is used by non contact sex offenders as a cathartic release, that the use would serve as an alternative outlet in contrast to physically offending. It was found that sex offenders with an anchored preference higher in levels of graphic child pornography with less amounts of collected images were more likely to be contact offenders while the lower level child pornographic preferences with high amounts of collected images proved to be of non contact offenders. According to another study, contact offenders were found to have higher rates of trading and producing child pornography with individuals with similar interests. Some subjects in one study demonstrated cognitive disassociation between the images and reality, where they believed that the people involved in the pornography were not people at all, but simply part of a whole picture.

=== Criticism ===
Dennis Howitt (1995) disagrees with such research, arguing the weakness of correlational studies. He argues that "one cannot simply take evidence that offenders use and buy pornography as sufficient to implicate pornography causally in their offending. The most reasonable assessment based on the available research literature is that the relationship between pornography, fantasy and offending is unclear."

A Swiss study reviewing the criminal record of 231 men who were charged with viewing child pornography found that those without a prior sexual conviction are unlikely to sexually assault a child. The study found that in the six years before the 2002 police operation, 1% were known to have committed a hands-on sexual offense and 1% committed a hands-on sex offense in the six years afterwards. The study reinforces previous research that consumers are well-educated and view other types of illegal pornography like acts involving animals and violence as well. Author Frank Urbaniok said it should not automatically be assumed that they were a risk for sexually assaulting a child and said: "Our results support the assumption that these consumers, in fact, form a distinct group of sex offenders. Probably, the motivation for consuming child pornography differs from the motivation to physically assault minors. Furthermore, the recidivism rates of 1% for hands-on and 4% for hands-off sex offences were quite low." A 2005 paper by Canadian researchers Michael Seto and Angela Eke found that of 201 men charged with child pornography offenses, 24% had committed prior offenses of sexual contact and 4% went on to commit subsequent sexual offenses after being charged or prosecuted.

== Views on reducing criminal sexual intent ==
Milton Diamond, from the University of Hawaii, presented evidence that "[l]egalizing child pornography is linked to lower rates of child sex abuse". Results from the Czech Republic indicated, as seen everywhere else studied (Canada, Croatia, Denmark, Germany, Finland, Hong Kong, Shanghai, Sweden, US), that rape and other sex crimes "decreased or essentially remained stable" following the legalization and wide availability of pornography. His research also indicated that the incidence of child sex abuse has fallen considerably since 1989, when child pornography became readily accessible – a phenomenon also seen in Denmark and Japan. The findings support the theory that potential sexual offenders use child pornography as a substitute for sex crimes against children. While the authors do not approve of the use of real children in the production or distribution of child pornography, they say that artificially produced materials might serve a purpose.

Diamond suggests to provide artificially created child pornography that does not involve any real children. His article relayed, "If availability of pornography can reduce sex crimes, it is because the use of certain forms of pornography to certain potential offenders is functionally equivalent to the commission of certain types of sex offences: both satisfy the need for psychosexual stimulants leading to sexual enjoyment and orgasm through masturbation. If these potential offenders have the option, they prefer to use pornography because it is more convenient, unharmful and undangerous (Kutchinsky, 1994, pp. 21)."

== See also ==
- Effects of pornography
  - Effects of pornography on young people
- Lolicon / Shotacon
- Pornography
- Sexual abuse
