= Exploitation of women in mass media =

Objections to media portrayal of women

The exploitation of women in mass media is the use or portrayal of women as sexual beings in mass media formats such as television, film, music, and advertising to increase commercial appeal, often leading to the detriment of the women being portrayed and women in society. This includes the presentation of women as sexual objects and the standard of feminine beauty ideals that women are expected to uphold, resulting in the sexual objectification and exploitation of women and girls in the media. Sexual exploitation of women in the media can be traced back to 19th century Paris, where ballerinas at the Paris Opera were subjected to sexual objectification and systemic exploitation by male patrons. The most often criticized aspect of the use of women in mass media is sexual objectification; this includes dismemberment where only specific parts such as lips, breasts, waist, hips and legs are shown rather than a whole individual. The exploitation of women in mass media has been criticized by feminists and other advocates of women's rights, and is a topic of discussion in feminist studies and other fields of scholarship.

== Specific formats ==
=== Advertising ===
Jean Kilbourne, Robert Jensen, Sut Jhally and other cultural critics accuse mass media of using sex in advertising that promotes the objectification of women to help sell their goods and services.

In Gender Advertisements, Erving Goffman sought to uncover the covert ways that popular media constructs masculinity and femininity in a detailed analysis of more than 500 advertisements. The relationship between men and women, Goffman argued, was portrayed as a parent–child relationship, one characterized by male power and female subordination.

Many contemporary studies of gender and sexualization in popular culture take as their starting point Goffman's analysis in Gender Advertisements. Among them, later research which expanded empirical framework by analyzing the aspects of women's sexualization and objectification in advertisements, M.-E Kang examined the advertisements in women's magazines between 1979 and 1991 and found out there are still showing the same stereotyped images of women: Nude or partially nude images of women increased nearly 30% from 1979 to 1991. Lindner further developed Kang's analytical framework in a study of women in advertisements and found out magazines rely on gender stereotypes, but in different ways, particularly in terms of sexualization. For example, in Vogue, sexualized images of women are the primary way of portraying women in positions of inferiority and low social power.

Research conducted by Eric Hatton and Mary Nell Trautner included a longitudinal content analysis of images of women and men on more than four decades of Rolling Stone magazine covers (1967–2009). It found that the frequency of sexualized images of men and women has increased, though the intensity of sexualization between men and women is different in that women are increasingly likely to be hypersexualized, but men are not. Researchers argue that the simple presence of images of sexualized men does not signal equality in media representations of women and men. Sexualized images may legitimize or exacerbate violence against women and girls, sexual harassment, and anti-women attitudes among men. They concluded that similarly sexualized images can suggest victimization for women but confidence for men, consider the implications when women are sexualized at the same rate as men are not sexualized, as they were on the covers of Rolling Stone in the 2000s.

Clothing designer Calvin Klein was criticized for using images of young, sexualized girls and women in his advertisements, having said:

"Jeans are about sex. The abundance of bare flesh is the last gasp of advertisers trying to give redundant products a new identity."

Calvin Klein has also received media attention for its controversial advertisements in the mid-1990s. Several of Calvin Klein's advertisements featured images of teenage models, some "who were reportedly as young as 15" in overly sexual and provocative poses.

In a recent analysis, it was found that almost 30% of the clothing items available for pre-teen girls on the websites of 15 national stores had sexualizing characteristics. The clothing emphasized or revealed a sexualized body part (e.g., bikinis and push-up bras), or had characteristics associated with sexiness (e.g., red satin lingerie-like dresses). This exploitation of women is being seen in younger girls.

American Apparel, founded in 1989, is a clothing retailer. Its advertising strategy was described by the National Center on Sexual Exploitation as normalizing the objectification of women by regularly featuring nude young women, emphasizing their buttocks and breasts. The founder of the company and its CEO, Dov Charney, was accused of keeping videos on a company server of him sexually engaged in sex acts with female models and employees.

The overt use of sexuality to promote breast cancer awareness, through fundraising campaigns like "I Love Boobies" and "Save the Ta-tas", angers and offends breast cancer survivors and older women, who are at higher risk of developing breast cancer. Women who have breast cancer say that these advertising campaigns suggest that having sexy breasts is more important than saving their lives, which devalues them as human beings.

Another trend that has been studied in advertising is the victimization of women. A study conducted in 2008 found that women were represented as victims in 9.51% of the advertisements they were present in. Separate examination by subcategory found that the highest frequency of this is in women's fashion magazines where 16.57% of the ads featuring women present them as victims.

The portrayal of women in advertising is influenced by the beauty myth, an idea that results in the presentation of primarily slender women with flawless skin and other socially acceptable features. Globalization has led to this portrayal becoming more uniform across different societies and cultures. Most women are unable to achieve the beauty standards shown because the appearance of the models has been modified using technical effects.

Since the 20th century, women have increasingly been sexualized and objectified in media, including television, movies, ads, and music videos. The physical appearance, body image, social norms, and beauty of women have always been portrayed in media falsely and unrealistically. In ads, music videos, and films, girls and women are shown as objects, and their humanity is diminished. The exploitation of women's bodies is used for advertising everything for entertainment. The fashion industry oversexualizes women's and girls' apparel; they are typically portrayed in sexually explicit attire, sexually suggestive cosmetics, and hypersexualized in advertisements. These brands usually prey on children and parents striving to keep up with the latest fashions. Models, supermodels, beauty queens, and even toys promote the idea that women and girls require unattainable levels of beauty and physical perfection.

Gallup & Robinson, an advertising and marketing research firm, has reported that in more than 50 years of testing advertising effectiveness, it has found the use of the erotic to be a significantly above-average technique in communicating with the marketplace, "...although one of the more dangerous for the advertiser. Weighted down with taboos and volatile attitudes, sex is a Code Red advertising technique ... handle with care ... seller beware; all of which makes it even more intriguing." This research has led to the popular idea that "sex sells".

Camille Paglia holds that "Turning people into sex objects is one of the specialties of our species." In her view, objectification is closely tied to (and may even be identical with) the highest human faculties toward conceptualization and aesthetics.

=== Film ===
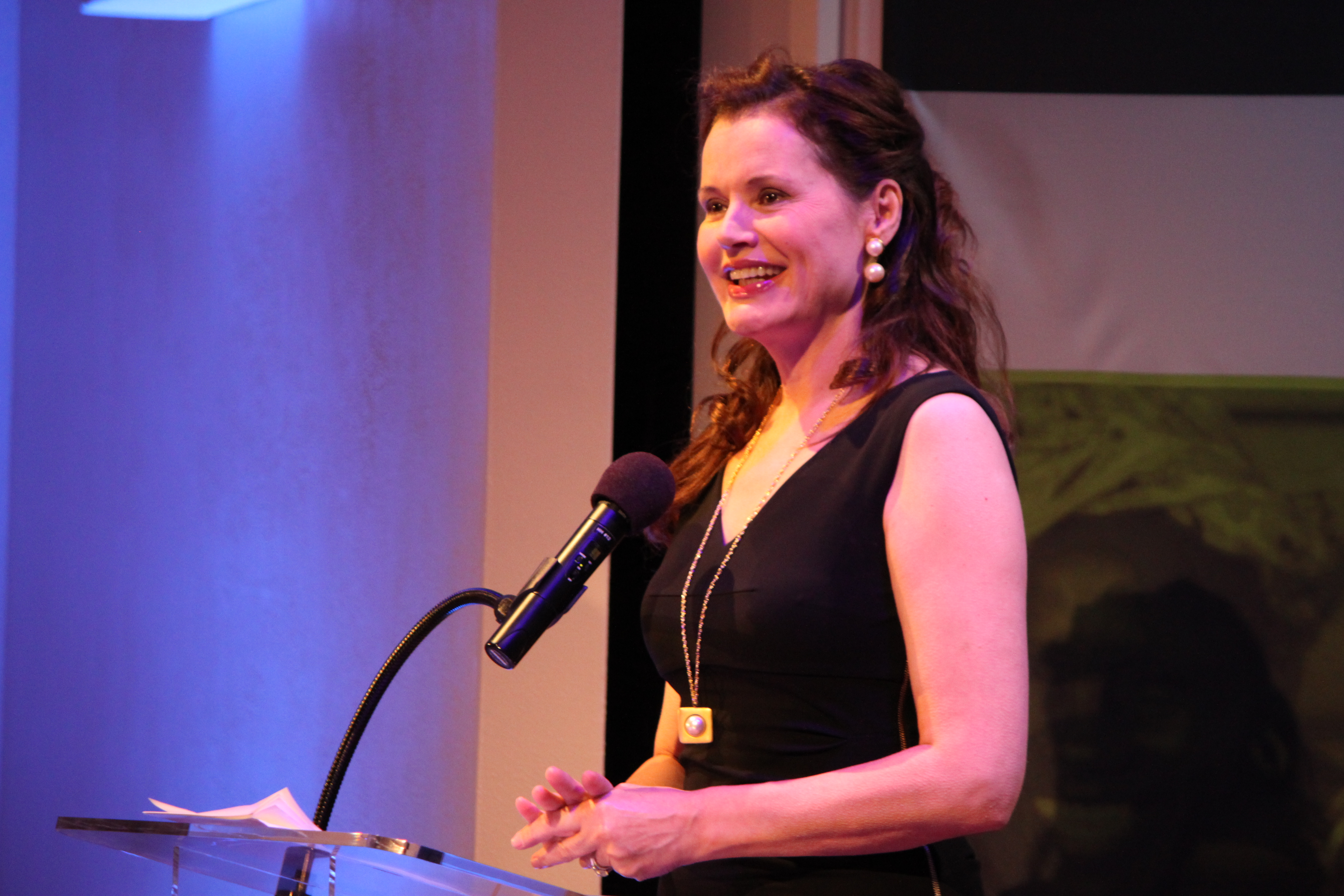
The Hollywood actress Geena Davis in a speech at the Millennium Development Goals Countdown event in the Ford Foundation Building in New York, addressing gender roles and issues in film (24 September 2013)

Historically, the film industry has been exploitative toward women both on and off screen. Stereotypically in film, women are often depicted as one dimensional characters, overly emotional, and subsequent compared to their male counterparts. This can be attributed to a myriad of reasons, for instance, the male dominance within the industry and lack of female representation. When it comes to the depiction of women on screen, there is a limited perspective of what women's humanity entails. According to Ward and Harrison, "media portrayals typically construct rather narrow and stereotypical portraits of women and of femininity." In film, there is more of an emphasis on the physical and sexual appeal of women, as objects of desire, or on the other side, appear as a respectable housewife or mother, allowing no depth or character development in between these stereotypes.

Furthermore, feminist film theorists have considered the Bechdel test, a popular test used in film to evaluate how women are represented in film. The Bechdel test, named after 1980's cartoonist Alison Bechdel. The test consists of two requirements: two women in the film have to have a conversation with one another about something other than a man, and the two female characters must be named. Even blockbuster movies that are considered to be more progressive fail this test, including The Avengers (2012), Avatar (2009), and Lord of The Rings (2001–2003). Although the Bechdel test is not an indication of whether or not women are properly represented in films, it brings attention to the gender inequality that exists in film and entertainment.

Many feminist film critics have pointed to the "male gaze" that predominates in classical Hollywood film-making. Budd Boetticher summarizes the view thus: "What counts is what the heroine provokes, or rather what she represents. She is the one, or rather the love or fear she inspires in the hero, or else the concern he feels for her, who makes him act the way he does. In herself the woman has not the slightest importance." Laura Mulvey's germinal essay "Visual Pleasure and Narrative Cinema" (written in 1973 and published in 1975) expands on this conception of the passive role of women in cinema to argue that film provides visual pleasure through scopophilia and identification with the on-screen male actor. She states: "In their traditional exhibitionist role women are simultaneously looked at and displayed, with their appearance coded for strong visual and erotic impact so that they can be said to connote to-be-looked-at-ness," and as a result contends that in film a woman is the "bearer of meaning, not maker of meaning". Mulvey suggests that Lacan's psychoanalytic theory is the key to understanding how film creates such a space for female sexual objectification and exploitation through the combination of the patriarchal order of society, and 'looking' in itself as a pleasurable act of voyeurism, as "the cinema satisfies a primordial wish for pleasurable looking".

Within the 56 top-grossing films of 2018 in North America, Scandinavia, Africa, Asia, Latin America and Europe, women and girls were four times more likely than men to be shown wearing revealing clothing; nearly twice as likely to be shown as partially nude; and four times more likely to be shown completely naked. The over-sexualization of female roles in popular Hollywood films has been found to harm girl's self-esteem and can cause them to want to alter their bodies to look more like the actresses in films and movies.

Although girls and women are heavily represented in the media, they are often portrayed as unrealistically beautiful, such as being significantly thinner and younger than the average. Women are also portrayed as being passive, dependent on men, and housewives. The media frequently present two archetypes of women: good and bad. Good women are loyal and focused on family life, taking care of their husbands and others. Bad women are the opposite – hard, cold, or aggressive.

One nonprofit organization, the Geena Davis Institute on Gender in Media, has been pushing the industry for years to expand the roles of women in film. Geena Davis has expressed that throughout the film industry, there has been a lack of female representation and a pattern of inaccurate portrayals of women and girls in movie roles.

Black women are presented by mass media as obnoxious, ignorant, confrontational and loud. Not only do they struggle with internalizing these fixed notions of who they are, they are also faced with definitions of beauty for African American girls that are measured against white standards of what beauty should be. Film and social media reflect an idea of female beauty based on features closely resembling those of women of European origin, which is nearly impossible for a black girl to attain, or indeed any young girl. At the same time black characters are typically depicted in films in occupational roles such as athletes, servants, musicians and criminals, roles which hold a lower status than the roles of white characters.

=== Music ===
A survey conducted as a part of the Human Use of Music Information Retrieval Systems (HUMIRS) project found that 73.1% of respondents identified themselves as being "avid listeners" of music. Popular music often contains messages about women that involve misogyny, sexual violence and abuse.

There are multiple online articles that seek to identify songs that have misogynistic lyrics. For example, an article in the online US women's magazine Bustle provided a clip of lyrics from the song "Fine China" by Chris Brown. He sings "It's alright, I'm not dangerous / When you're mine, I'll be generous / You're irreplaceable; Collectible / Just like fine China." The article went on to conclude that the song was demeaning to women by referring to them as objects or possessions. Another example of this is found in the song "Animals" by Maroon 5. A lyric from this song is "Baby I'm preying on you tonight. Hunt you down, eat you alive. Just like animals."

Music is a key factor in the socialization of children. Children and adolescents often turn to music lyrics as an outlet away from loneliness or as a source of advice and information. The results of a study through A Kaiser Family Foundation Study in 2005 showed that 85% of youth ages 8–18 listen to music each day. While music is commonly thought of as only a means of entertainment, studies have found that music is often chosen by youth because it mirrors their own feelings and the content of the lyrics is important to them. Numerous studies have been conducted to research how music influences listeners behaviors and beliefs. For example, a study featured in the Journal of Youth and Adolescence found that when compared to adolescent males who did not like heavy metal music, those who liked heavy metal had a higher occurrence of deviant behaviors. These behaviors included sexual misconduct, substance abuse and family issues.

==== Music's effect on how women are perceived ====
In July 2018 there was a movement about the "restrictions on language eroding women's ability to craft narrative in music." The movement addressed the importance of how women and mainly their bodies are portrayed in songwriting. They spoke about all matters such as, women having the ability to feel comfortable with these lyrics and not as if they are being objectified.

An article on the Los Angeles Times talks about misogyny in rap music by asking the question, "Does rap music disrespect women, girls?" In asking this they interviewed many young children to get their responses. One child at the age of 17 mentioned, "Let's put it like this: The only way a female can be disrespected is if she's a 'ho'. Most raps are written from experience. Just because rappers sing about 'hos' doesn't mean every female is one. Rapping is either about what you have been through, or it is made to sell records. A lot of girls get offended by what rappers say, but another reality is it's hard for a black man to make a living in this world. You have to be heard. We have a lot of gifts and talents in South-Central Los Angeles, but not a lot of people come here. I know a lot of kids who write good poetry, but if one kid has a bad image, people on the outside think we're all alike."

=== Music videos ===
Gan, Zillmann and Mitrook found that exposure to sexually explicit rap promotes unfavorable evaluations of black women. Following exposure to sexual rap, as compared with exposure to romantic music or to no music, the assessment of the female performers' personality resulted in a general downgrading of positive traits and a general upgrading of negative ones. A 2008 study by Zhang et al. showed that exposure to sexually explicit music videos was associated with stronger endorsement of sexual double standards (e.g., belief that it is less acceptable for women to be sexually experienced than for men). Exposure to sexual content was also associated with more permissive attitudes toward premarital sex, regardless of gender, overall television viewing, and previous sexual experience. However, Gad Saad argues that the premise that music videos yield harmful effects and that the harm would be sex-specific (e.g., women's self-concepts will be negatively affected) has not been supported by research.

A survey found that 72.2% of black, 68.0% of white, and 69.2% of Hispanic youths agree with the suggestion that rap music videos contain "too many" references to sex.

Despite the lack of adequate research linking music videos to negative self perception by young girls, research has shown adolescents have a higher susceptibility rate than other age brackets. More importantly, music videos are one of the many significant mediums that perpetuate sexual objectification of females, implicitly creating fixed gender norms.

=== Modeling ===
A study conducted in the UK found evidence that anorexia nervosa is a socially transmitted disease and exposure to skinny models may be a contributing factor in the cause of anorexia nervosa.

According to model, Sarah Ziff, stories are told in the industry about models being sexually assaulted. Fernanda Ly, a pink-haired model who has worked for designers such as Louis Vuitton and Christian Dior, says that she was groped at a young age by a stylist while shooting a lookbook, and the memory still haunts her. In 2007 Anand Jon Alexander, a successful designer who appeared on America's Next Top Model, was arrested on charges of rape, sexual battery and performing lewd acts on a child, charges which in many cases concerned models who aspired to work for him. He was sentenced to 59 years in prison.

Models have been denied food on shoots as they are expected to be thin, according to model Vanessa Perron. Due to the low level of regulation in the industry, modeling agencies often view their models as independent contractors rather than employees and attempts to unionize the industry have been largely unsuccessful. There are allegations that a fraudulent modeling agency in Florida drugged aspirant models and used them to create pornographic films. According to former agency executive Carolyn Kramer: "When you're a supermodel like Giselle or Christy Turlington you're treated like royalty, but 99% of models are treated like garbage". The low level of regulation makes it easy for bad agencies to thrive and treat workers as nothing more than a source for profit. In their defence, modeling agencies have said that models work at odd hours for different clients, which means they cannot be considered employees. Legally speaking, models sign on to management companies and not the other way around. The Model Alliance, created by the model Sara Ziff, provides its members with protection, advice and support. It is guided by a partnership between the American Guild of Musical Artists and the Actors' Equity Association.

Being a fashion model is much more complex than it seems. The fashion industry is frequently exposed for abusing its models unethically. The fashion industry perceives itself as empowering beautiful women and expressing them through the lens. Still, it has a darker side that differs from the glamorous image in high fashion magazine prints. The modelling industry promotes eating disorders, lacks diversity, sexually abuses its models, and hires too-young models. Famous supermodels like Ashley Graham, Winnie Harlow, and Jourdan Dunn came out against the bias for the stereotypical model, which is tall, slim, and blonde. The business has come under fire for its lack of racial and bodily diversity. Only ten years have passed since the industry began developing laws responding to unrealized expectations. The Council of Fashion Designers of America addressed the issue of eating disorders among models in 2007, the same year Britain banned the employment of models under the age of 16.

=== Pornography ===
Pornography has contributed to the exploitation of women in media.

In Effects of Prolonged Consumption of Pornography, a review of pornography research conducted for the Surgeon General in 1986, Dolf Zillmann noted that some inconsistencies in the literature on pornography exist, but overall concluded that extensive viewing of pornographic material may produce some negative sociological effects, including a decreased respect for long-term, monogamous relationships, and an attenuated desire for procreation. He describes the theoretical basis for these conclusions stating:

The values expressed in pornography clash so obviously with the family concept, and they potentially undermine the traditional values that favor marriage, family, and children... Pornographic scripts dwell on sexual engagements of parties who have just met, who are in no way attached or committed to each other, and who will part shortly, never to meet again... Sexual gratification in pornography is not a function of emotional attachment, of kindness, of caring, and especially not of continuance of the relationship, as such continuance would translate into responsibilities, curtailments, and costs...

Another study conducted by Svedin, Åkermana, and Priebe concluded that male partners' use of pornography might be integrated within the objectification theory framework for women, considering that pornography is a socialization agent for sexual attitudes and behavior. It often portrays men objectifying women via gazing at women's breasts and/or labia, non-permitted aggressive and sexualized touching of women's body parts, making sexual and derogatory remarks about women's body parts, and engaging in forceful oral and anal sex despite women gagging and crying. As pornography portrays women succumbing to this objectification, male viewers may internalize a view that these behaviors are acceptable. According to the tenets of social learning theory, men who view pornography may learn and transfer the objectifying behaviors they view in pornography to sexual encounters with their female partners. Men's pornography use may correspond to higher levels of experienced sexual objectification by their female partners. Pornography usage may also enable men to treat their female partners in objectifying ways and believe that it is acceptable to do so.

Partner's use of pornography can also be negatively linked to women's well-being. Qualitative studies of women whose male partners heavily use pornography have revealed that these women reported lower relational and psychological well-being. The women perceived that their partner's pornography use was connected to their inability to be intimately and authentically open and vulnerable within their relationships. Women from this qualitative research also reported a personal struggle regarding the implications of their male partners pornography use for their own self-worth and value. These women were feeling less attractive and desirable after becoming aware of their male partner's pornography use. Similarly, women view their partners in a new way. The general conclusion that women feel is that their partner is not who they originally thought he/she was. The mate is seen as a sexually questionable and degraded being since the partner seeks sexual fulfilment through the objectification and sometimes degradation of women.

On the Internet, there is a widespread practice of female exploitation. This ranges from: trafficking, prostitution, mail-order-bride trade, pornography, rape, and sexual harassment. In pornography, women often act as though they want to be violated and possessed, and men as though they want to violate and possess these women. This represents the inequality of the gender hierarchy, where females are seen as sub-human in comparison to men. Pornographic materials are predominately focused around men's sexual desires.

==== Black women in pornography ====
Mireille Miller-Young believes that the adult film industry is another device to racialize black women. Miller-Young talks about Jeannie Pepper being a pivotal figure in the adult industry for black women. Black women are being fetishized as sexual object to obtain by men, this perception has been around since the slave trade. The porn industry presents dangerous stereotypes that hinder black women, as well as, normalizing violence towards black women. Not only does the adult film industry feed on racism but it does not knowledge the work that black women do for the economy.

=== Social media ===
Social media has a prominent effect on people's lives, especially those who use social media platforms more frequently than others. A study conducted in 2006 found inverse relationships between the frequency of social media usage and the relationships adolescents formed with the impact it had on their sense of self. When social media usage increased, adolescents began to form stronger relationships online while their sense of self was impacted negatively. According to a study conducted by Xinyan Zhao, Mengqi Zhan, and Brooke F. Liu, social media content that weaves emotional components in a positive manner appears to have the benefit of also increasing one's online influence. Positive social media content results in increased presence on networking sites among adolescent users.

Digital social media platforms such as Twitter, Instagram, and Snapchat allow individuals to establish their influence through sharing opinions, insights, experiences and perspectives with others. In the 2000s, these platforms have emerged as integral communities for publics to voice their opinions, resulting in a changed online behavior associated largely with misinformation. One example of these behaviors is displayed in a 2017 Dutch study conducted by Johanna M. F. van Oosten. This study found that adolescents play out stereotypical gender roles in their self-presentations in social media. Results of this study show that it is predominantly women that feel pressured to conform to hyper femininity and stereotypical gender roles online, including personality traits, domestic behaviors, occupations, and physical appearances.

Furthermore, social media has a prominent influence on how adolescent girls and women have on their self-image. In Cohen's study, #BoPo on Instagram, found that young women have more favorable attitudes toward posts and accounts that promote body positive content, as opposed to thin-ideal accounts, which cause a negative association. Furthermore, social media trends such as "fitspiration" contribute to negative body image for females. In a study by Simpson and Mazzeo, they found that users are more likely to comment according to body-image standards, rather than health standards, and had a comparable amount of praise for fitness appearance as a thin appearance. Social media comparison can go beyond physical appearance. In Sheldon and Wiegand's study, they found that on Instagram, young females and women also compare themselves on the basis of success, intelligence, and happiness.

Research has shown a significant scientific link between social media and depression among young girls. In addition, this link between depression and social media perceptions has been connected to obesity among young girls. The negative implications social media poses on women associated with their appearance or how they carry themselves reveals a chain reaction; the depression related to negative social media experiences can manifest itself in the form of poor academic performance and further mental and physical health issues.

Such evidence of substantial mental and physical harm suggests that the root of the problem can be found not only within social media advertising and usage, but in the way young girls are taught to internalized responses on various social media platforms.

Since the early 2000s, more and more people, especially children, are going on social media. As people in the United States become more dependent on social media, these children who join social media are being influenced by what they see online. There has been an increase of influencers who are setting trends that may affect some young girls' self esteem. The National Center for Health Research reports on about social media and its affects on young people's mental health. Authors Elina Mir, Caroline Novas, and Meg Seymour report, "Almost 25% of adolescents believe that social media has mostly a negative effect". In other words, young people—the majority of whom are girls—have realized that social media affects their mental health. This can also be seen through a recent study highlighting a strong connection between social media's role in construction identity, gender and sexuality. This has been linked to some social media sites exhibiting prejudiced and problematic themes found within the content consumers are exposed to. If people would not be as dependent on social media, these statistics would be different.

=== Television ===
Television is often subject to criticism for the sexual exploitation of women on screen, particularly when teenagers are involved. In 2013, the Parents Television Council released a report that found that it was increasingly more likely for a scene to be exploitative when a teenage girl was involved. The report also found that 43 percent of teen girls on television are the targets of sexually exploitative jokes compared to 33 percent of adult women. Rev. Delman Coates, a PTC board member said, "young people are having difficulty managing the distinction between appropriate and inappropriate sexual conduct". This report is of a series that's about media sexualization of young girls.

The researchers from the study claim that "[i]f media images communicate that sexual exploitation is neither serious nor harmful, the environment is being set for sexual exploitation to be viewed as trivial and acceptable. As long as there are media producers who continue to find the degradation of women to be humorous, and media outlets that will air the content, the impact and seriousness of sexual exploitation will continue to be understated and not meaningfully addressed in our society."

A 2012 study led by sociologist Stacy L. Smith found that in both prime-time television and family films, women were highly likely to be depicted as thin and scantily clad. They were also vastly underrepresented in STEM fields when compared to their male counterparts, and had less speaking roles. According to this study, only 28.3 percent of characters in family films, 30.8 percent of characters in children's shows, and 38.9 percent of characters on prime time television were women.

According to a 2013 report by the Women's Media Center (WMC), the gender gap was not declining at that time and in some industries it was increasing. In television, it found that the percentage of female TV characters had decreased and that the ones who appeared on-screen were less likely to be leading roles than the male characters. "According to the Center for the Study of Women in Television & Film's 'Boxed In' report, CW Television Network is the only TV network where women can be seen in accurate proportion to their representation in the U.S. population."

=== Video games ===
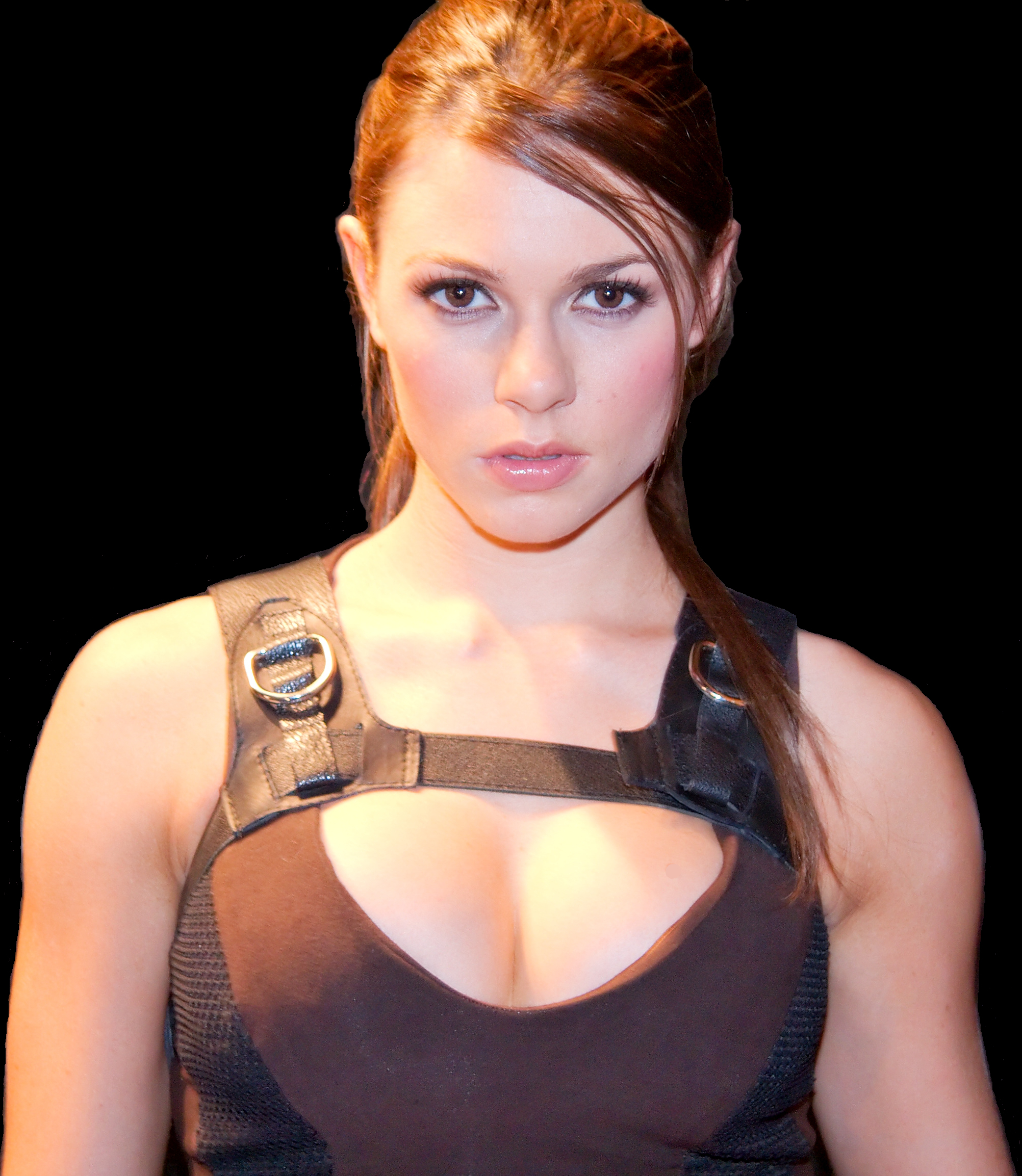
The video game heroine Lara Croft (here portrayed by Alison Carroll) is often cited as an example for the sexual objectification of women in video games.

According to a report done by the Entertainment Software Association in 2013, 55% of game players are male and 45% are female. Women's roles in many modern games usually are less important to the game and rely heavily on stereotypes. Many of the female characters found in video games intentionally depict woman to be sultry and enhance the body form of females in an effort to appeal to men's desires. Many games practice racism through omission of racially diverse characters.

Video games have been found to offer a smaller range of roles to female characters compared to male characters, and these roles tend to involve being victims or prizes to be won. The majority of female characters are also not playable. These roles for women have been found to have a negative impact on the perception of women in gaming and even main playable female characters are found to be unrealistically proportioned with revealing clothing. If a sexualized female character is the main protagonist and portrayed in a positive light, studies have shown a potential negative effect if the character is hyper-sexualized in a stereotypical manner. A recent Ohio State University Study has found that sexist and violent content in games cause male gamers to identify with the male lead, and find less empathy with female victims of violence, although a 2017 review of this paper suggested several flaws and a reanalysis of the dataset using different statistical methods found no sexist effect, concluding "These results call into question whether use of "sexist" video games is a causal factor in the development of reduced empathy toward girls and women among adolescents". Similarly, the results of a 2015 study suggested that "sexist video game play is related to men perceiving women in a stereotypic and sexist way", but found that the same correlation did not occur with female players.

A German longitudinal study from 2011 to 2015 explored the connection between gaming and sexist attitudes. The results of this study concluded both that playing video games was not predictive of sexist beliefs and that sexist beliefs were not predicative of video game play. The researchers stressed, however, that the study did not, nor was intended to, disprove the existence of sexist attitudes in general. A 2012 study also raised concerns about the correlation between video games and individual attitudes. Focusing on the Singaporean subjects playing the game Grand Theft Auto, the study found some evidence of "first order cultivation effects" – which relate to the perceptions of situations and issues – but found that second order effects, relating to beliefs and issues, were provided with only limited support by the study. This led the authors to conclude that previous studies on cultivation effects from television may not directly relate to effects from video game playing.

The trend of portraying sex-typed images of women and violence against women in popular video games continues to proliferate and promulgate in video games. Video games depicting sexual objectification of women and violence against women resulted in statistically significant increased rape myths acceptance for male study participants but not for female participants. A 2016 study by Fox and Potocki had similar findings, in which they ran a survey which found that "video game consumption throughout the life span is associated with interpersonal aggression, hostile sexism, and RMA [Rape Myth Acceptance]".

Out of the top 10 video games listed midyear 2010 (New Super Mario Brothers; Call Of Duty: Modern Warfare; Battlefield: Bad Company 2; Final Fantasy XIII; Wii Fit Plus; God of War III; Pokémon SoulSilver; Wii Sports Resort, Mass Effect 2, Pokémon HeartGold Version; Morris, 2010), several have violent content, including violence against women, and some contain sexual objectification of women. Not only are gamers increasingly being exposed to video games containing sexual objectification of and violence against women, but research also indicates that such exposure can be excessive. A national sample of youth aged 8 to 18 found that "8.5 percent of video game players exhibited pathological patterns of play," which is "very similar to the prevalence demonstrated in many other studies of this age group, including across nations".

== Effects on society ==
Critics of the prevalent portrayals of women in the mass media observe possible negative consequences for various segments of the population, such as:

- Women self-objectify in terms of body surveillance by adopting a form of self-consciousness in which they habitually monitor their own body's outward appearance and spend significant amounts of attention on how others may perceive their physical appearance.
- Unrealistic expectations held of how women should look or behave.
- Stereotyping of women who are positively portrayed by or sexualized in the media, such as the theme of a "dumb blonde" or "blonde bimbo", limiting the societal and career opportunities for people who fit these stereotypes.
- Psychological/psychiatric disorders such as body dysmorphic disorder, anorexia nervosa, and bulimia nervosa.
- The excessively coercive appeal to strong sexual instincts to sell products or promote media.
- Increase in the likelihood and acceptance of sexual violence.

According to Muehlenkamp and Saris–Baglama, self-objectification of women can lead to depression, noting that "the relationship between self-objectification and depression can be explained by the anxiety and powerlessness women may experience as a result of not knowing when or where they will encounter objectification. These feelings may increase women's vulnerability to depressive symptoms. Once a woman starts to self-objectify and compare her body to others, it may be a risk factor for human functioning, and may also lead to impairment in multiple life tasks, such as forming meaningful interpersonal relationships and achieving academic success."

In addition, it can lead to sexual dysfunction. Engaging in sexual activity involves another person focusing attention on one's body. During sexual relations a woman can be distracted by thoughts about her body rather than experiencing sexual pleasure.

Many studies have shown the negative effects that this exploitation of women in the media has on the mental health of young women, but recently the studies have focused on aging women in western societies. It has been observed that the exploitation of young attractive women in the media causes aging women to feel a variety of emotions including sadness, anger, concern, envy, desensitization, marginalization, and discomfort that their appearance was being judged by others.

A study done in 1994 about the effects of media on young and middle-aged women found that of adolescent girls aged 11–17, the primary desire was to "lose weight and keep it off." The results were not different for older women. When asked what they would like to change about their lives, the answer, for over half, was regarding their bodies and weight.

A recent study done by Vanderbilt University illustrated how sexist commercials have a greater impact on wellbeing than commercials that do not exploit women. The study was designed with three different groups: one was exposed to sexist media, one was exposed to neutral media, and the control group was not exposed to media at all. Of the women exposed to sexist advertising, there was a substantial difference. The women in this group expressed having a body larger than it was in reality and expressed feeling a greater disparity between their own body and the "ideal body." Following exposure to this kind of media, there was an immediate negative effect on their mood. It was also concluded that adolescent girls exposed to sexist media are the most highly impacted demographic.

A study reported in 2018 demonstrated the effects of showing a group of women, aged from 18 to 41, images of thin and overweight (or plus size) female models. The researchers measured the change in the subjects' views of their body image and their overall anxiety levels. The results of the research showed that the social comparison effects of viewing images of thin women can worsen body image and increase anxiety.

Studies have found that 11% of girls worldwide would consider themselves beautiful, and only six in ten women avoid participating in life activities based on how they perceive themselves. Studies have also proven that media is directly correlated with the mental wellbeing of young women. Jess Wiener, an expert for the Dove Self-Esteem Project, explains that "viewing unrealistic and unachievable beauty images creates an unattainable goal which leads to feelings of failure. This is especially true of young girls who have grown up in a world of filters and airbrushing."

The exploitation of women in mass media begins from a young age, which becomes noticeable in media texts such as Lolita. The Lolita Effect is a term coined by Meenakshi Gigi Durham, taken from Vladimir Nabokov's novel Lolita, that highlights "the sexualization of girlhood in today's highly mediated and global society". The Lolita Effect involves the exhibitionist element of femalehood and its submissive connection to Laura Mulvey's theory of the male gaze. The Lolita effect also emphasizes the perfect body often portrayed in mass media, focusing on thin and white women. This ideal body reinforced through the Lolita effect is linked to the broader industry that produces weight-loss pills, surgery, enhancements and much more. Another point made by the Lolita Effect involves how young girls begin to become labelled and viewed as sexual objects. This sexualization is furthered by the mass media through popular culture products and messaging that reaches these young audiences. Low self-esteem and psychological disorders, including eating disorders, are also linked to this phenomenon.

=== Effects on young children and adolescents ===
Exposure to the negative ways in which women are portrayed in the media has an effect on how boys view women in society and how girls view themselves. Statistically, a significant number of young children are exposed to sexualized media texts from early childhood. Influence upon girls' self-image has been reported for girls as young as 5 or 6. According to the social cognitive theory, modeling such behaviors outlined within popular media have long-lasting effects upon the self-awareness and self-identity of young girls.

In a study on the sexualization of women in media, by the American Psychological Association, it was found that women or girls are, more likely to be dressed provocatively and forced into poses that are sexually suggestive. Another study, on print media, completed by psychology researchers at Wesleyan University found that 51.8% of the time, women are objectified in advertisements. This number changes when the study was narrowed to men's print, where women were objectified in an increased 76% of advertisements.

A common problem among young girls is a number of afflictions directly related to a negative body image, that can resort from these objectifying ads. The APA is aware of this situation and put together a task force to complete a study across all major advertising and media platforms. What they found was numerous problems found in young women can be traced back to these displays of women as sexual objects. The affects span a wide range of disorders and illnesses, from anxiety, eating disorders, depression, and even prevent young girls from creating a healthy sex life. This task force is reaching out to both the media and families with young children in an attempt to properly inform all individuals on the negative impacts of the way media is used.

Teenagers are very susceptible to advertising messages. Particularly, the pathologizing of the human body, which is when advertisements make people feel bad about themselves so they feel the need to buy a product. This encourages an unhealthy obsession with one's physical appearance, in addition to the physical changes that come during one's adolescent years. This can be extremely harmful to one's self esteem and overall mental and physical health.

A study conducted by the Department of Psychology at Knox College provided insight into risk factors such as media consumption hours, self-objectification, religiosity, and television mediation; each show to affect rates of media influence and rates of self-internalization of the potential negative influences.

=== Effects on women of colour ===
In media, women of color and diverse backgrounds are often misrepresented, underrepresented, and perpetuated by harmful stereotypes. When it comes to women in the media, there is already a lack of positive representation, but when there are female portrayal, they are predominantly represented as white, young, glamorous, heterosexual, and less influential than men. Therefore, when it comes to women of a minority background, their portrayal relies heavily on stereotypes that are often perpetuated by people who are not a part of these diverse communities. For instance, Portrayals of African American women are limited, even in films and print media that target Black audiences.

Black women stereotypes are consistently portrayed in the media. This includes: "angry" and "sassy" black woman, or even a "hypersexual Jezebel". During the Jezebel era, black women were placed outside of the societal standards of American beauty. This stereotype caused men to justify the exploitation of black women. Stereotypically, the black woman's caricature is a sassy, gum chewing, twerking woman. This is portrayed in different music videos by popular artists, such as in Meghan Trainor's "All About That Bass" and Taylor Swift's "Shake It Off". Ultimately, this becomes an issue because black women are presented as hyper-sexualized.

Support has shown that the effects of media exploitation vary for women of different ethnic backgrounds. Research has depicted that these implications often resonate beyond cultural boundaries, to cause significant differences among black, white, Latina, and Asian women.

According to the American Psychological Association, when comparing one's body to the sexualized cultural ideals, this significantly impaired the ability for women of these ethnicities to regulate cognitive functions, including logical reasoning and spatial skills.

Within the media, black women are more often shown with characteristics pertaining to the ideal White beauty standard. For example, in advertising black women will be shown with white ideals such as a light complexion, thin figures, and long straight hair. This is contrasting black standards of beauty, which include big lips, wider body, and dark complexion.

Spanish-language TV in the United States statistically projects more stereotypical roles for Latina women, often portraying them as 'exoticized' and 'overly sexual'; meanwhile, more Latina youth, on average, watch television than that of the standard caucasian American child. This combination increases the acceptance of negative effects for women minorities, leading to a greater acceptance of traditional gender roles and negative stereotypes. However, studies have shown that Latina women who watch more black-oriented television shows see a general increase of body acceptance over time.

Bollywood is not exempt from the exploitation of women, with ageist themes occurring in Indian media. For Indian women on screen, their bodies represent a sense of fragile femininity, so they no longer uphold that ideal as they age. Compared to women, males can stay the protagonist in the Bollywood industry much longer. Regarding women and the protagonist heroine character, "fewer older women find such work except as mothers and minor relatives". When women contribute to self-sexualization and objectifying their bodies, they encourage and invite the male gaze. A study by Slatewala found that Bollywood music videos are the primary media text for the sexualization of women in Indian media. Additionally, Bollywood music videos increasingly present objectified images and scenes of women based on which decade it came out, with more recent videos showing more revealing scenes.

The exploitation of women in mass media is persistent across cultures and societies. Mass media is exported across the globe, generating effects for non-western women. Asian and Chinese women report an increase in eating disorders and body issues attributed to "Westernization" and westernized ideals of beauty. China's beauty industry and media also heavily emphasize thin and youthful femininity. A study conducted by Jackson, Jiang, and Chen found that Chinese and Asian women report feeling more affected by the physical portrayals in Chinese and Asian mass media rather than Western media.

=== Effects on men and boys ===
The exploitation of women in mass media is reinforced through the portrayals of stereotypical gender roles. These roles show women as sexually submissive and men as sexually dominant. The ongoing objectification of women, furthered by men, encourages the "socialization of objectified body consciousness among women". This socialized objectification is a cycling notion for women that continues throughout one's exposure to mass media products.

Masculine ideals remain a force in mass media that encourages how men and boys view themselves, promoting masculine individuals, while displaying how to view women, as feminine individuals. Femininity is framed in specific ways across media texts that emphasize and idealize particular ways of treating, interacting, and pursuing women. This is discussed in a study by Ward, Merriwether and Caruthers, men who read men's magazines more often and are prominent TV viewers adhere more to the stereotypical gender views of women's submission and male dominance. Additionally, they are more accepting of perceiving women as sexual objects.

=== Violence ===
Media plays a role in how violence against women is perceived. Media such as film, TV, and video games popularize and desensitize users' perceptions of the treatment of women. According to a study by Easteal, media portrayals of women consistently perpetuate patriarchal views and present a problematic picture of violence toward women.

=== Rape myths ===
According to O'Connor from the National Library of Medicine, rape myths are "beliefs that often reference survivors of sexual assault and blame the victim rather than the perpetrator of a rape." An instance of a rape myth would be the belief that the victim, commonly a woman, "asked for it." She "asked for it' by dressing provocatively, flirting, or behaving promiscuously.

Whenever a sexual assault case goes public or goes to court, those who believe in rape myths question the validity of the victim. Temkin, Gray, and Barrett founded research that "shows that those who believe in rape myths are more likely to find the defendant not guilty, to believe that the complainant consented, and to place at least some of the blame for the events upon the complainant."

Mass media often portrays rape myths on television, mainly fictional shows. Because of the increasing exposure to the sexual assault of women on said shows, viewers are desensitized and more susceptible to rape myth acceptance. Because rape myths are publicized by the media, people accept them, which would have severe effects on the victims' livelihoods.

Mass media also prevents women from speaking out about their trauma without being accused of false accusations. In the #MeToo movement, these accusations were seen by the media and were both accepted and questioned. As Anna Brown stated in her research, out of those who believed that people could easily make a false report, 28% were against the #MeToo movement, while 7% were not.

== Sexualization of women ==
Young women all over the world are experiencing sexualization, nearly one in five girls is sexually abused at least once in her life. Sexualization of women, especially young women, has been a global crisis. 18 percent of girls report that by age 17 they have been victims of a sexual assault or abuse at the hands of another adolescent. UNICEF has been a leading advocate for young women, helping them to escape underage marriage and domestic violence. Many experts believe the impact of social media has an increasing factor towards the sexualization of women. The media is involved in the daily life of many women, especially younger women. This has influence on their body image and behaviour. UNICEF states, "women and girls are repeatedly objectified and their bodies hyper sexualized, the media contributes to harmful gender stereotypes that often trivialize violence against girls." Due to social media increasing one's ability to be exposed to hyper-sexualization, many women's-based organizations have been formed. Women's Media Center (WMC) created an organization called FBomb; a women-run platform that educates young women about the dangers of media and the online dangers that can occur. FBomb not only educates, but also dedicates an entire blog page to worldwide issues affecting women of all ages. It discusses how typical "Rom Coms" lead people to believe that women are inferior, as typically portrayed in movies, books, and other forms of entertainment. Along with this, the page discusses famous women who have made an impact on society, including Sacheen Littlefeather. The article explains how her small act of defiance of Hollywood sparked a large pro-women movement in the movie and TV industry.

=== Cultural history of women's sexualization ===
One of the main reasons it is so hard to defeat sexualization of young women, is due to the deep history and sometimes cultural background that is intertwined with this issue. Some cultures have practiced the marriage of underage brides for hundreds of years. In the United States and other modernized countries, there are ethics laws that prevent underage marriage, but it remains very common, especially in tribes based in Africa. Along with African tribes, some sections of Islam believe in this as well, many times they are arranged with women as young as twelve or thirteen marrying men older that fifty or even sixty years old. The Council Of Foreign Relations created a map showing where child marriages are most prominent. This map shows that 70%-80% of women under the age of 18, and 35% of women under the age of 15 are married in the country of Niger. Along with Niger, countries in South America including Brazil, and Nicaragua also have high rates of child marriages, both almost reaching 50%. Many families partake in these arranged, underaged marriage provide for the extremely poor. Child brides are often "offerings", where they arrange for their daughters as a trade for money, or even higher social status. The Council of Foreign Relations states, "Poverty, cultural norms, and the low societal value of women and girls are the primary forces that fuel early marriage, although the relative significance of each varies from community to community."

=== Women outside of the United States ===
In many parts of the world, women are subjected to exploitation by the media- continuing dangerous stereotypes and societal inequalities. Exploitation is not confined to the United States but extends globally, appearing in various forms and intensities depending on cultural, social, and economic contexts.

Similar to the U.S., women in other countries are frequently objectified and sexualized in media representations. Advertising, television shows, movies, and even news coverage often prioritize women's physical appearance over their talents, intellect, or achievements. This reinforces the idea that a woman's worth is primarily tied to her physical attractiveness.

Social media platforms have become a tool for perpetuating sexual exploitation, especially among vulnerable populations like indigenous girls. Women outside the United States are exploited by the media through the objectification and hyper-sexualization of their image. Indigenous girls, in particular, are often portrayed in a sexualized manner, which not only sustains harmful stereotypes but also normalizes the sexual exploitation of young women. The media, including social media platforms, often contribute to this by sharing and distributing images and narratives that reduce indigenous girls to mere objects of desire, disregarding their agency and humanity. Facebook, for instance, was found as a common site used to identify and target potential victims, particularly Indigenous girls who may have limited access to education and information about exploitation risks.

== Counter arguments ==
Danish criminologist Berl Kutchinsky's Studies on Pornography and sex crimes in Denmark (1970), a scientific report ordered by the Presidential Commission on Obscenity and Pornography, found that the legalizing of pornography in Denmark had not (as expected) resulted in an increase of sex crimes. Since then, many other experiments have been conducted, either supporting or opposing the findings of Berl Kutchinsky, who would continue his study into the social effects of pornography until his death in 1995. His life's work was summed up in the publication Law, Pornography, and Crime: The Danish Experience (1999). Milton Diamond from the University of Hawaii found that the number of reported cases of child sex abuse dropped markedly immediately after the ban on sexually explicit materials was lifted in 1989.

Some researchers, such as Susan Bordo and Rosalind Gill, argue against using the phrase "sexual objectification" to describe such images because they often depict women as active, confident, and/or sexually desirous. For this argument, there have been several refutations that intensity of women's sexualization suggests that "sexual object" may indeed be the only appropriate label. The accumulation of sexualized attributes in these images leaves little room for observers to interpret them in any way other than as instruments of sexual pleasure and visual possession for a heterosexual male audience. Yet, some scholars have criticized such statements as overly homogenizing because they render invisible differences in this process of sexualization.

Some social conservatives have agreed with aspects of the feminist critique of sexual objectification. In their view, however, the increase in the sexual objectification of both sexes in Western culture is one of the negative legacies of the sexual revolution. These critics, notably Wendy Shalit, advocate a return to pre-sexual revolution standards of sexual morality, which Shalit refers to as a "return to modesty", as an antidote to sexual objectification.

=== The female gaze ===
Soap operas operate for the female gaze, focusing on family and community relations that are popular among women. Across the globe, soap operas remain an important entertainment genre for women. Their popularity is apparent with their allowance of "multiple identifications by the audience" because women can recognize and empathize with the characters' storylines.

The film Legally Blonde opposes women's exploitation in mass media, especially the dumb blonde stereotype. Legally Blonde looks at women from the feminine perspective, emphasizing the female gaze over the male gaze. It stands against the male gaze through women's camaraderie, intelligence, and female attitude.

== Theoretical approaches ==
=== Gender performative theory ===
Gender performative theory was introduced by Judith Butler in their book, Gender Trouble: feminism in the subversion of identity. Butler's theory suggests that behavior is not indicative by whether someone were born male or female, but behave in a way to fit into society. The way someone dresses, behaves, and acts is a performance and does not indicate gender identity. In their research essay, "Performative Acts and Gender Constitution: An Essay on Phenomenology and Feminist Theory," Butler divides gender performance in three sections: Sex/Gender: Feminist and Phenomenological Views, Binary Genders and Heterosexual Contract, and Feminist Theory: Beyond an Expressive Model of Gender. In Section I, Butler makes note of the difference between the phenomenological and feminist features of the body, arguing that physical sex is not what defines a gender, but rather the embodiment of gender. Section II discusses the commodification of women in society and how certain gender roles are widely accepted as normal, resulting in social stigma and gender oppression for women. Finally, Section III focuses on how gender is not exclusively a feminist political topic, but rather exists as an active effort or performance, which help shape and change cultural and societal views of gender.

=== Sexual script theory ===
Sexual script theory, popularized by Gagnon and Simon in their book, Sexual Conduct (1973). Sexual scripts are a sociological theory that guide sexual behaviors. According to Gagnon and Simon, there are three types of scripting: cultural scenarios, interpersonal scripts, and intrapsychic scripts. Cultural scenarios refer to the instruction in collective meanings agreed on by a culture or society, while interpersonal scripts are scenarios presented by an individual in a specific social context, and intrapsychic scripts are what an individual desires.

=== Social cognitive theory ===
Social cognitive theory, an extension of Bandura's social learning theory, is a psychological theory that suggests that people are influenced by their own social experiences and environment. In terms of gender, social cognitive theory is related, as the conception of gender is constructed from experiences and interactions that are learned as a result of social influences.

=== Cultivation theory ===
Cultivation theory states that over time, exposure to mass media such as television, movies, or video games influences an audience's perceptions of reality. Most notably, George Gerbner founded the theory of cultivation, specifically looking into the influence that television has on audiences, especially regarding violence. Cultivation theory plays a role in which how women on screen are perceived, especially regarding violence.

=== Male gaze theory ===
Male gaze theory, popularized by Laura Mulvey, is a concept many feminist film critics have pointed to in classical Hollywood film-making. Laura Mulvey's theory on the male gaze describes how viewers respond to visual content. The term "male gaze" describes a sexualized form of seeing that allows men to objectify women. Women are presented to heterosexual men in a sexualized fashion as objects of desire. For the male viewer, the sexualization of women occurs in visual media that responds to male voyeurism. According to Mulvey, the theory refers to the "to-be-looked-at-ness" of film. The male is the "carrier of the look," and the female is the "spectacle." Budd Boetticher summarizes the view of male gaze: "What counts is what the heroine provokes, or rather what she represents. She is the one, or rather the love or fear she inspires in the hero, or else the concern he feels for her, who makes him act the way he does. In herself the woman has not the slightest importance." Laura Mulvey's essay "Visual Pleasure and Narrative Cinema" (1975), expands on the concept of the passive role of women in cinema to argue that film provides visual pleasure through scopophilia and identification with the on-screen male actor. Mulvey states, "In their traditional exhibitionist role women are simultaneously looked at and displayed, with their appearance coded for strong visual and erotic impact so that they can be said to connote to-be-looked-at-ness," and as a result contends that in film a woman is the "bearer of meaning, not maker of meaning". Mulvey suggests that Lacan's psychoanalytic theory is the key to understanding how film creates such a space for female sexual objectification and exploitation through the combination of the patriarchal order of society, and 'looking' in itself as a pleasurable act of voyeurism, as "the cinema satisfies a primordial wish for pleasurable looking."

=== Commodification theory ===
Commodification theory is a system in which goods, services, materials, and ideas are turned into commodities. According to Karl Marx, "Commodification is a process by which exchange value comes to dominate use value." In different forms of media, the exploitation and objectification of women can be considered a form of commodification. In media such as advertising where the goal is to target women as consumers, in turn, women also see themselves as commodities. According to Winship:

Femininity is recuperated by the capitalist form: the exchange between commodity and "woman" in the ad establishes her as a commodity too... it is the modes of femininity themselves which are archived through commodities and are replaced by commodities.

Sayings like "sex sells" contribute to the idea that women are considered a commodity, and are further objectified by exploiting the sexualization and fragmentation of the female body.

== See also ==
- Dehumanization
- Gender in advertising
- Killing Us Softly
- Media and gender
- Misogyny and mass media
- Miss Representation
- Rape culture
- Sex in film
- Sexual content in video games
- Sexuality in music videos
