= David Sonenschein =

American anthropologist

David Sonenschein (died May 2021) was an American anthropologist. He was a researcher at the Kinsey Institute and was a consultant in the 1969 Presidential Committee on Obscenity and Pornography. He is the author of Pedophiles on Parade, a two-volume book published in 1998. He worked as a school clerk in Austin, Texas.
