= Malamuth =

Malamuth is a surname. Notable people with the surname include:

- Charles Malamuth (1899–1965), Polish-Jewish-American journalist
- Neil Malamuth, American psychologist
