= A. W. B. Simpson =

British legal historian (1931–2011)

Alfred William Brian Simpson
- Born: 17 August 1931; Kendal, Cumbria, England
- Died: 10 January 2011 (aged 79); Sandwich, Kent, England
- Citizenship: UK
- Occupations: Legal scholar, educator, legal historian
- Spouses: Kathleen Seston (m. 1954; div. 1968) Caroline E.A. Brown (m. 1969)
- Children: 5

Academic background
- Education: The Queen's College, Oxford

Alfred William Brian Simpson, QC (Hon.), JP, FBA (17 August 1931 – 10 January 2011) usually referred to as Brian Simpson and publishing as A. W. Brian Simpson, was a British legal historian and legal philosopher. At the time of his retirement, he was Charles F. and Edith J. Clyne Professor of Law at the University of Michigan Law School.

== Biography ==
Born in Kendal, Cumbria, Simpson was the son of the Rev Canon Bernard W. Simpson and Mary Simpson. His interest in law began when he was young, as he describes attending a murder trial in Leeds when he was a boy. Simpson was educated at Lancing House in Lowestoft, Oakham School and The Queen's College, Oxford on a closed scholarship, where he took a First in Law, the best first of his year. He registered for a doctorate in 1954, but never completed it.

After a year as a junior research fellow at St Edmund Hall, Oxford, he became a fellow and tutor in Law at Lincoln College, Oxford, from 1955 to 1973. He was a member of H. L. A. Hart's informal discussion group on jurisprudence, a subject he became associated with as a result. However, diffidence precluded him publishing on the subject until the end of his life.

Increasingly unhappy in Oxford, Simpson began to look further afield. As a result of National Service with the Nigeria Regiment, he retained an interest in Africa, and was Dean of the Faculty of Law of the University of Ghana in 1968–69. In 1975, he left Oxford to join the University of Kent as Professor of Law, where he remained until 1983. He joined the University of Chicago Law School as Professor of Law in 1984, and the University of Michigan Law School in 1986, where he remained until retirement.

He also held visiting professorships at Dalhousie University (1964), the University of Chicago (1979, 1980, 1982, 1984), the University of Michigan (1985), the University of Cambridge (Arthur Goodhart Visiting Professor in Legal Science, 1993–94) and the University of Toronto (2009). In the 1970s, Simpson was a member of the Heilbron Committee on the law of rape and the Williams Committee on Obscenity and Film Censorship.

In 1976 Simpson was awarded a DCL by Oxford; he received honorary degrees from the University of Ghana (Hon. DLitt, 1993), Dalhousie University (Hon. LLD, 2003) and the University of Kent (Hon LLD, 2003). He was elected Fellow of the British Academy in 1983 and of the American Academy of Arts and Science in 1993. In 1995 he was elected an honorary fellow of Lincoln College, Oxford, and he was appointed an honorary Queen's Counsel in 2001.

== Scholarship ==
A leading historian of the common law, Simpson pioneered the study of 'leading cases' which he thought "deserved the fullest possible study in their historical context". He became so identified with this approach that this type of scholarship became known as 'doing a Simpson' in some circles. According to Simpson, the idea for this approach came to him in 1979 when he was lying in a bath and realized that Rylands v Fletcher, the case which developed strict liability, was the result of a serious reservoir failure. His famous book, Cannibalism and the Common Law (1984), adopts this approach to study the Victorian cause célèbre R v Dudley and Stephens (1884). The book sold well and was reprinted by Penguin, though its impact on academic law was limited because he did not explicitly articulate a theory linked to the narrative. Many of his articles on 'leading cases' were collected in Leading Cases in Common Law (1995).

Toward the end of his career, he turned his attention toward the history of human rights in the twentieth century, though he had no special training in international law. He wrote In the Highest Degree Odious: Detention without Trial in Wartime Britain (1992) and Human Rights and the End of Empire: Britain and the Genesis of the European Convention (2001).

His work as a legal historian also led him into the debate concerning law and economics, an approach he first encouraged at Chicago and Michigan and toward which he was sceptical. In 1996, he became involved in a debate with Ronald Coase over the latter's handling of Victorian case law, particularly Sturges v Bridgman, in his seminal article "The Problem of Social Cost". Coase was dismissive of Simpson's criticism, which was followed by a riposte by Simpson.

Simpson returned to an aspect of his own legal education at Oxford in a book published posthumously in September, 2011, Reflections on `The Concept of Law,' delineating the environment in which H. L. A. Hart had produced the classic of jurisprudence in the setting of Oxford linguistic philosophy.

== Selected bibliography ==
- Introduction to the History of the Land Law, 1961, new edition as A History of the Land Law (2nd ed.). Oxford: Clarendon Press. 1986 – via Internet Archive.
- (ed.) Oxford Essays in Jurisprudence, 2nd Series, 1973
- A History of the Common Law of Contract, 1975
- Pornography and Politics, 1983
- Cannibalism and the Common Law: The Story of the Tragic Last Voyage of the Mignonette and the Strange Legal Proceedings to Which It Gave Rise. Chicago and London: University of Chicago Press. 1984. ISBN 978-0-226-75942-5.
- Biographical Dictionary of the Common Law. London: Butterworths. 1984. ISBN 978-0-406-51657-2 – via Internet Archive.
- Legal Theory and Legal History: Essays on the Common Law, 1987
- Invitation to Law, 1988 (trans. Chinese 2008)
- In the Highest Degree Odious: Detention Without Trial in Wartime Britain. Oxford: Clarendon Press. 1992. ISBN 978-0-19-825775-2 – via Internet Archive.
- Leading Cases in the Common Law. Oxford: Clarendon Press. 1995 – via Internet Archive.
- Human Rights and the End of Empire: Britain and the Genesis of the European Convention. Oxford and New York: Oxford University Press. 2001. ISBN 978-0-19-826289-3.
- Reflections on 'The Concept of Law. Oxford: Oxford University Press. 2011. doi:10.1093/acprof:oso/9780199693320.001.0001.
