= Hardcore pornography =

Explicit graphic depictions of sexual acts

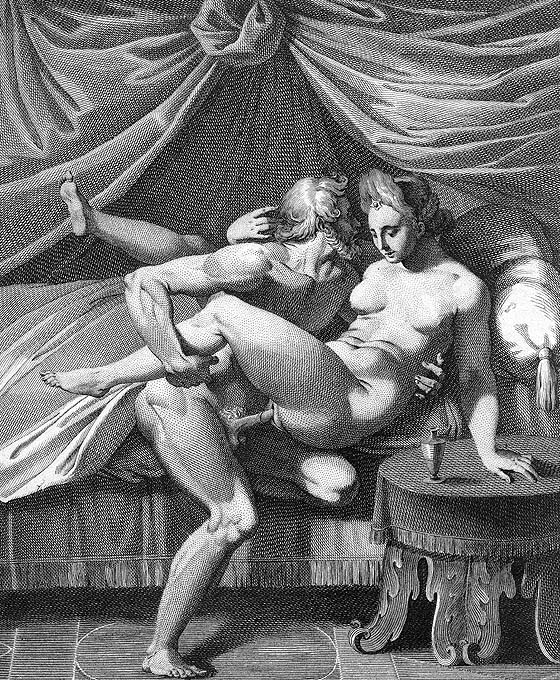
Jupiter and Juno by Annibale Carracci is a 16th-century engraving that depicts, in detail, a divine sexual act. It shows vaginal penetration, including aroused male and female genitals, as is common in hardcore pornography.

Hardcore pornography or hardcore porn is pornography that features detailed depictions of sexual organs or sexual acts such as vaginal, anal, oral, or manual intercourse; ejaculation; or fetish play. The term is in contrast with less-explicit softcore pornography. Hardcore pornography usually takes the form of magazines, photographs, films, and cartoons. Since the mid-1990s, hardcore pornography has become widely available on the internet, much of it without cost, making it more accessible than ever before.

== Etymology ==
A distinction between "hardcore pornography" and "borderline pornography" (or "borderline obscenity") was made in the 1950s and 1960s by American jurists discussing obscenity laws. "Borderline pornography" appealed to sexual prurience, but had other positive qualities, such as literary or artistic merit, and so was arguably permitted by obscenity laws; "hardcore pornography" lacked such merits and was definitely prohibited. In Roth v. United States (1957), the government brief distinguished three classes of sexual material: "novels of apparently serious literary intent"; "borderline entertainment ... magazines, cartoons, nudist publications, etc."; and "hard core pornography, which no one would suggest had literary merit". Eberhard and Phyllis Kronhausen in 1959 distinguished "erotic realism" from "pornography"; in the latter "the main purpose is to stimulate erotic response in the reader. And that is all." Most famously, in Jacobellis v. Ohio (1964), Potter Stewart wrote:

I shall not today attempt further to define the kinds of material I understand to be embraced within that shorthand description ["hard-core pornography"], and perhaps I could never succeed in intelligibly doing so. But I know it when I see it, and the motion picture involved in this case [The Lovers] is not that.

In Jacobellis v. Ohio and other cases, the United States Supreme Court ruled that only "hardcore" pornography could be prohibited by obscenity laws, with the rest protected by the First Amendment. The category of "borderline obscenity" thus became obsolete. The 1970 report of the President's Commission on Obscenity and Pornography said:

[M]ailers dealing in sexually oriented materials define "hard-core pornography" as "photographic depictions of actual sexual intercourse with camera focus on the genitals and no accompanying text to provide a legal defense". This, of course, is not a legal definition.... Some judges have employed the term "hard-core pornography" as a synonym for "material which can be legally suppressed". In this Report, the term is used as a synonym for "under-the-counter" or covertly sold materials. This is, in effect, the definition of hard-core applied in the marketplace. It can be argued that because of the confusion about the meaning of the term, which stems primarily from an undefined legal concept, it would be well to avoid the use of the term altogether.... There is one genre of sexually oriented material which is almost universally sold under-the-counter in the United States: wholly photographic reproductions of actual sexual intercourse graphically depicting vaginal and/or oral penetration.... A[t] present, distinctions between materials sold openly and those sold covertly have become extremely unclear.

From the 1970s, the salient distinction was between hardcore pornography and softcore pornography, which may use simulated sex and limits the range and intensity of depictions of sexual activities. For example, William Rotsler's 1973 classification subdivided the X rating for erotic films: "The XXX-rating means hard-core, the XX-rating is for simulation, and an X-rating is for comparatively cool films."

== History ==
The prehistory of modern pornography is the classical American stag film, also known as blue movies, a body of clandestine short pornographic films produced during the first two-thirds of the 20th century. While the exact corpus of the distinctive stag film remains unknown, scholars at the Kinsey Institute believe there are approximately 2000 films produced between 1915 and 1968. Stag cinema is a form of hardcore film and is characterized as silent, usually filling a single reel or less, and was illegally made and exhibited because of censorship laws in America. Women were excluded from these private screenings that were shown in American "smoker" houses such as fraternities or other exclusive institutions. In Europe, films of the same kind were screened in brothels. The mode of reception of the all-male audience of stag films was raucous, collective sexual banter and sexual arousal. Film historians describe stag films as a primitive form of cinema because they were produced by anonymous and amateur male artists who failed to achieve narrative coherence and continuity. Today, many of these films have been archived by the Kinsey Institute, but most are in a state of decay and have no copyright, real credits, or acknowledged authorship. The stag film era inevitably ended with the beginnings of the sexual revolution in the fifties in combination with the new technologies of the post-war era, such as 16 mm, 8 mm, and the Super 8. American stag cinema in general received scholarly attention first in the mid-seventies by heterosexual males, e.g. Di Lauro and Gerald Rabkin's Dirty Movies (1976) and more recently by feminist and queer cultural historians, e.g. Linda M. Williams' Hard Core: Power Pleasure, and the "Frenzy of the Visible" (1989) and Thomas Waugh's Homosociality in the Classical American Stag Film: Off-Screen, On-screen (2001).

== Legality and regulation ==
Globally, there are substantial differences in the legal status, regulation, and enforcement of laws pertaining to hardcore pornography. In the late 20th century, many Western countries switched from strict prohibitions on obscenity to regulations based on age verification and zoning; however, some Asian and African jurisdictions still have outright bans, while others use specialized classification systems.

=== Europe ===
In Europe, national movie classification systems and EU-wide digital safety mandates are the main tools used to control hardcore pornography.

- Denmark: Denmark established a precedent for decriminalization in Western Europe in 1969 when it became the first nation globally to fully legalize the production and distribution of hardcore pornography.
- France: France established an official "X" classification for hardcore pornographic films in 1975 with the introduction of the "Loi X," which was incorporated into the 1976 Law of Finances. This framework, which was codified under Article 1605 sexies of the General Tax Code, imposed a special 20% tax on hardcore media profits, raised the value-added tax (TVA) to 33%, prohibited minors from watching the content, and restricted exhibitions to adult theaters. Robust digital age-verification systems are required by current regulations for online content.
- United Kingdom:
  The statutory "R18" rating badge from the British Board of Film Classification (BBFC) necessary for the legitimate commercial distribution of hardcore pornographic content in the UK.

In May 2000, the Video Recordings Act gave the British Board of Film Classification (BBFC) the authority to regulate hardcore pornography for commercial distribution under the restrictive "R18" classification. The Online Safety Act 2023 imposes strict statutory age-verification frameworks on online commercial content.

=== North America ===
- United States: As long as it doesn't violate federal laws prohibiting child exploitation, hardcore pornography is generally protected by the First Amendment's free speech protections. The three-pronged Miller test established in Miller v. California (1973) defines the constitutional boundary between protected pornography and unprotected obscenity. Zoning laws and enforcement practices vary greatly between states and municipal lines.
- Canada: Section 163 of the Criminal Code, which targets "obscene" materials, governs the legality of hardcore materials. Rather than emphasizing moral corruption, the Supreme Court of Canada redefined obscenity in R. v. Butler (1992) using a "community standards of tolerance" test that focuses on whether the material causes harm, especially through the dehumanization or degradation of women.

=== Asia ===
- Japan: The distribution of "obscene" images is strictly prohibited by Article 175 of the Penal Code of Japan, despite the country's multibillion-dollar adult video (AV) industry. Japanese producers of hardcore pornography are required by law to use digital pixelation or mosaic censorship over explicit depictions of genitalia.
- South Korea: The Act on Promotion of Information and Communications Network Utilization and Information Protection prohibits the production and distribution of hardcore pornography that includes explicit sexual acts or genital exposure. By implementing Internet Service Provider (ISP)-level Server Name Indication (SNI) filtering to block both domestic and foreign explicit websites, the government increased enforcement in 2019.
- India: The sale, publication, transmission, or digital distribution of sexually explicit acts is illegal under Sections 292 of the Indian Penal Code and Sections 67 and 67A of the Information Technology Act, 2000. The Ministry of Electronics and Information Technology periodically requires ISPs to block thousands of explicit commercial URLs in order to prevent public distribution, even though the private, non-commercial viewing of adult pornography is not specifically illegal under current jurisprudence.

=== Africa and Latin America ===
- South Africa: The Film and Publication Act of 1996 decriminalized the distribution and possession of explicit adult content after apartheid ended, substituting a strict age-classification tier (X18) overseen by the Film and Publication Board. Content that features child exploitation or non-consensual acts remains strictly prohibited.
- Brazil: Hardcore pornography involving consenting adults can be produced and sold legally as commercial entertainment. However, distribution is limited by the Statute of the Child and Adolescent (ECA), which imposes strict point-of-sale or digital age barriers and severely punishes exposing minors to explicit adult content.

== Impact on society ==
Berl Kutchinsky's Studies on Pornography and Sex Crimes in Denmark (1970), a scientific report commissioned by the United States' Presidential Commission on Obscenity and Pornography, found that the legalizing of pornography in Denmark had not (as had been expected) resulted in an increase of sex crimes.

A study conducted in Denmark in 2003 and later published in Archives of Sexual Behavior found that Danish men and women generally believe that hardcore pornography has a positive influence on their lives.

== See also ==
- List of pornography laws by country
