= Paedophiles and Sexual Offences Against Children =

1995 book

- Author: Dennis Howitt
- Language: English
- Genre: Nonfiction
- Publisher: Wiley
- Publication date: 1995
- Publication place: United Kingdom
- Pages: 302
- ISBN: 978-0471955917

Paedophiles and Sexual Offences Against Children is a book written by British psychologist Dennis Howitt and published by Wiley in 1995.

Howitt provides a social constructionist view of pedophilia (which he defines "generic[ally]") in the book, under which he analyses the history of the acceptance of sexual activities between adults and children, including the history of pederasty in Ancient Greece, coming-of-age rituals in Papua New Guinea, and the emergence of age-of-consent laws in contemporary society.

He writes that research on negative effects from sexual acts between adults and children are biased and generally conducted "through concentrating on clinical samples of victims", while "in earlier decades, evidence of great trauma tended not to be found". He analyzed an earlier 20th-century Dutch study of boys aged 10 to 16, which, he wrote, "suggested the relationships [between the boys and adult men] to be overwhelmingly consensual, with little or no sign of adverse influence on their general sense of well-being". The book also contains criticism of the phallometric test.
