= Effects of pornography =

Influence of pornography on an individual and their intimate relationships

Pornography can be defined as any material, in any format, including texts, videos, photos, or audio, that is consumed for sexual satisfaction and arousal of an individual or partnership. The effects of pornography on individuals or their intimate relationships have been a subject of research. Despite a concerted lobbying campaign arguing that pornography has harmful effects, scientific evidence is mixed or inconclusive on the effect of pornography on its users. Scholars note that much of the research on the effects of pornography often confuses correlation with causation.

== Key theories ==
=== Sexuality theories ===
==== Sexual strategies theory ====
Sexual strategies theory can be strongly linked to pornography consumption and its effects. This theory is originally proposed by psychologists David Michael Buss and David P. Schmitt in 1993. The theory details how men and women are biologically wired differently when it comes to seeking avenues of sexual and romantic endeavors. It argues that these biological evolutions and differences still exist today when choosing sexual material or even a romantic partner. Some other researchers also backed up Buss and Schmitt's theory, emphasizing how men are more attracted to the physicality of a person, while women are attracted to more of the status of a person.

In the context of pornography consumption, the sexual strategies theory is most relevant to men. Males would consume more pornography to have a visual physicality of certain pornographic actors, which would play into even more frequent consumption of the material.

=== Sexual scripting ===
Research into the effects of pornography is greatly influenced by Script Theory. Originally proposed by researcher Silvan Tomkins, Script Theory proposes that behavior is a series of "scripts", or programs in order to achieve a goal. These scripts provide meaning for specific patterns, actions or behaviors that an individual does in certain contexts of achieving that goal. In 1986, Simon and Gagnon applied script theory to sexuality research, asserting that sexual scripts fall under a category of cultural scripts to regulate sexual behaviors.

== Psychological ==
=== Pornography addiction ===
Pornography addiction is a purported behavioral addiction characterized by compulsive, repeated use of pornographic material which causes serious consequences to one's physical, mental, social, and/or financial well-being. There is no diagnosis of pornography addiction in the current Diagnostic and Statistical Manual of Mental Disorders (DSM-5), though the DSM-5 considered the diagnosis of hypersexuality-related behavioral disorders (to which porn addiction was a subset), but rejected it because "there is insufficient peer-reviewed evidence to establish the diagnostic criteria and course descriptions needed to identify these behaviors as mental disorders." Instead, some psychologists suggest that any maladaptive sexual symptoms represent a manifestation of an underlying disorder, such as depression or anxiety which is simply manifesting itself sexually, or, alternatively, there is no underlying disorder and the behavior simply is not maladaptive. It is argued that psychologists do not recognize the concept of addiction, only chemical dependence, and some believe the concept and diagnosis to be stigmatizing and unhelpful.

A 2016 systemic review found that studies have linked self-perceived pornography addiction (SPPA) to increased isolation and relationship breakdowns for both users and their partners. The review noted that some methodological limitations in the primary studies, such as a lack of representative samples and inadequate measurement tools, could weaken the overall conclusions. The researchers concluded the review with a recommendation for further research.

A 2022 book by McKee, Litsou, Byron, and Ingham cast doubt on the model of "porn addiction", suggesting that sexual shame should be blamed, instead of pornography.

Fotinos et al. suggest there is a problem with excessive pornography consumption, but state that moderate pornography consumption can be healthy.

Neuropsychopharmacological and psychological researches on pornography addiction conducted between 2015 and 2021 have concluded that most studies have been focused entirely or almost exclusively on men in anonymous settings, and the findings are contradicting.

The International Classification of Diseases, 11th edition (ICD-11) added pornography to Compulsive Sexual Behavior Disorder (CSBD). CSBD is not an addiction and should not be conflated with sex addiction.

DSM-5-TR, published in March 2022, does not recognize a diagnosis of porn addiction.

=== Studies and evidence of effects ===
Two 2016 neurology reviews found evidence of addiction related brain changes in internet pornography users. Psychological effects of these brain changes are described as desensitization to reward (which can be related to cognition), a dysfunctional anxiety response, and impulsiveness. Another 2016 review suggests that internet behaviors, including the use of pornography, be considered potentially addictive, and that problematic use of online pornography be considered an "internet-use disorder".

Introductory psychology textbook authors Coon, Mitterer and Martini, passingly mentioning NoFap (former pornography users who have since chosen to abstain from the material) speak of pornography as a "supernormal stimulus" but use the model of compulsion rather than addiction.

A number of studies have found neurological markers of addiction in Internet pornography users, which is consistent with a large body of research finding similar markers in other kinds of problematic users. Yet other studies have found that critical biomarkers of addiction are missing.

According to the American Society of Addiction Medicine, some psychological and behavioral changes in response to developing addiction include addictive cravings, impulsiveness, weakened executive function, desensitization, and dysphoria. BOLD fMRI results have shown that individuals diagnosed with compulsive sexual behavior (CSB) show enhanced cue reactivity in brain regions associated traditionally with drug-cue reactivity.

These regions include the amygdala and the ventral striatum. Men without CSB who had a long history of viewing pornography exhibited a less intense response to pornographic images in the left ventral putamen, possibly suggestive of desensitization. As of 2024, ASAM admits that sexual addiction is not a valid diagnosis.

A more extreme case of pornography use could even result in impaired decision making. In some other cases, extreme levels of consumption could result in sexual bias, in which an individual would respond more greatly if there is an active presence of sexual stimuli.

Much of the relevant research we identified on the relationship between consumption of pornography and aspects of healthy sexual development misinterpreted correlation as causality. [...] Much of the research on pornography has been normative; it has assumed that the only healthy form of sexuality is vanilla sex (that is, not kinky) between monogamous couple-based partners for reasons beyond simply pleasure.

— McKee, Litsou, Byron, and Ingham (2022)

'Previous research has documented connections between media use and violence against women' [...] Having read this book, the reader will understand that the actual data do not support such confident claims of a causal relationship (see Stanley et al., 2018, for a more nuanced account of the literature).

— McKee, Litsou, Byron, and Ingham (2022)

A 2023 narrative review found that increasing internet pornography consumption, particularly among men, is closely linked to compulsive sexual behavior and may function as a coping mechanism for stress, anxiety, and depression. While some users report temporary mood regulation benefits, many also experience guilt and internal conflict related to their behavior. The authors state:

Taken together, these findings show that stressful experiences, anxiety, and depression are strongly related to pornography consumption. In addition, conflicting emotional experiences as well as identity problems significantly increase vulnerability to addictive sexual behavior and pornography consumption.

— Privara and Bob (2023)

Privara and Bob admit that pornography addiction is not a recognized diagnosis, they also say that narcissists who watch pornography tend to get a disapproving image of their own body, which would explain the rise in cosmetic surgery (such as labiaplasty). They argue that sexual addiction is strongly correlated with narcissism.

A 2025 systematic review of longitudinal studies on adolescent pornography use found heterogeneous results, with some studies indicating significant associations between pornography use and various outcomes (including sexual behaviors, sexual aggression, and life satisfaction), while other results were inconsistent. The review concluded that further research is needed to clarify relationships between types and patterns of pornography use in adolescents.

A 2025 public policy research, including about teenagers using pornographic media, says "The evidence to substantiate these assertions remains preliminary" (causality cannot be shown). That is, the existing evidence does not support public policy stances about how teenagers use media. However, the review did not concentrate upon pornography use, and just mentioned it passingly.

== Mental blocks in individual "physicality" ==
Although there are no significant outward effects on the physicality of an individual, pornographic consumption can still have an effect on how individuals view their bodies and how they would change certain aspects of their physicality to better mirror those in the pornographic material. This in turn will lead to issues of self-esteem, body dysmorphia and overall body image issues.

=== Men and masculine "attractiveness" ===
Sexual performance changes a man's view of his masculinity, and often his self-esteem. Pornography is not the only factor affecting men's self-esteem and body image. Popular media often depicts strong but lean men as the ideal attractive body type and goal. Men would also make comparisons with the pornographic models due to a level of dissatisfaction. These can include face shape, hair and muscle mass. All of these elements could significantly contribute to men's self esteem levels. As of 2021, few studies have evaluated how exposure to pornography relates to men's body image. Researchers recommend that others conduct more studies on pornography's effect on men's psychology.

=== Public health ===
Pathologizing any form of sexual behavior, including pornography use, has the potential to restrict sexual freedom, influence restrictive legislation, compromise freedom of expression, and stigmatize individuals who engage in the behavior. Researcher Emily F. Rothman, author of Pornography and Public Health stated that the professional communities are not advocating for the "push" in labelling pornography as a "public health crisis". Rothman and Nelson have described this as a "political stunt". The ideas supporting the "crisis" have been described as pseudoscientific.

== Sexual effects ==
The sexual effects of pornography on intimacy and relationships observe some of the most gendered differences. Men and women differ in how they are impacted by pornography on the psychological and behavioral levels, both within and beyond a romantic or sexual relationship.

It can negatively impact sexual functioning, especially in men. However, pornography can function as an educational resource for individuals to improve their sexual knowledge, and women who consume pornography more regularly experience increased desire for sexual activity, indicating that pornography might be useful as a form of foreplay.

=== Sexual desire ===
Sexual desire is one of the factors that have an impact on the gender differences the most. In general, men experience the most acute effects from pornography in terms of sexual desire. Straight men report less sexual desire, both for their partner and in general, directly after consuming pornography. Men also typically utilize pornography for masturbation and solo-sexual activities, rather than partnered or joint purposes.

Among women, there is some evidence that women who view pornography feel more positively about expressing their sexual desires. Women may express more sexual attraction specifically for their partner on days when they watch pornography.

Although research in the way of same-sex relationships is limited, available findings indicate that pornography use is connected to an increased level of sexual desire. Men partnered with women report less sexual desire in general with increased pornography consumption, whereas women in both mixed-sex or same-sex relationships report greater sexual desire overall. Also, individuals were less likely to consume pornography the day after engaging in sexual intercourse.

=== Sexual function ===
Studies have found no evidence that pornography causes erectile dysfunction, delayed ejaculation, and/or anorgasmia in men, though quality of available evidence is poor. It has been proposed that pornography may contribute to sexual dysfunction, however there is little causal evidence of such an effect. Another issue is delayed ejaculation, an issue where men may experience a large disconnected sensation between their orgasm and ejaculation. Some may experience difficulty achieving ejaculation altogether. Overarching research shows little evidence of pornography having any effect on delayed ejaculation.

In women, there is little evidence for pornography-induced sexual dysfunction. The most commonly observed effect is increased anxiety or distress, which may then lead to issues of overall sexual function. The most commonly reported issue for women is arousal dysfunction, indicating a difficulty in achieving or maintaining arousal during sexual activity. The paper identified an association between erectile dysfunction and pornography use, but could not determine causality.

Pornography users are more sexually active (real sex in real life) than the rest of the population.

A 2021 systematic review of 44 articles within the past 5 years found "that there is little evidence for simplistic narratives in public or scientific spheres that describe pornography use as universally good or bad for sexual functioning outcomes." The researchers state "In some situations, pornography use is associated with greater sexual functioning and greater sexual satisfaction, and in other cases it seems to be associated with lower sexual functioning and lower sexual satisfaction," and that "mere pornography use itself was most often not associated with sexual functioning in either direction, but self-reported problematic use of pornography was consistently associated with more sexual functioning problems.

A 2024 review shows that evidence is lacking for pornography induced sexual dysfunction, but a small percentage of its users might be affected (2-8%).

A 2026 review shows that simple pornography consumption does not cause erectile dysfunction, the relationship between pornography and ED being much more complex.

=== Sexual satisfaction ===
Despite the lack of evidence for more physical issues with sexual function, pornography is correlated with lower sexual desire and sexual satisfaction (there are significant, but very low correlations). (Note: The percentage of explained variance is ridiculously low.) However, a causal link has not been established. It may be that causation is reversed and lower sexual satisfaction drives pornography use. In a meta-analysis on pornography consumption and satisfaction, Wright et al. (2017) found a depreciation of marriage satisfaction having an r squared=0.01 (it explained extremely few of the variance). That is, the correlation is significant, but very weak.

In the same analysis, the authors found no consistent overall link between women's pornography consumption and elements of satisfaction studied to date, though noted that "If women's satisfaction in these domains is positively or negatively affected, it likely occurs within specific subgroups that have been less frequently studied or under circumstances not yet identified." In contrast, they found that "Men as a group, on the other hand, do demonstrate lower sexual and relational satisfaction (but apparently not self and body satisfaction) as a function of their pornography consumption. While there may be a reciprocal element to these dynamics (i.e., lower sexual and relational satisfaction leading to pornography consumption), the convergence of results across cross-sectional survey, longitudinal survey, and experimental results points to an overall negative effect of pornography on men's sexual and relational satisfaction."

=== Sexual violence ===
==== Controlled studies ====
A controlled study describes the relationship between given behaviors or environmental conditions and health effects in a laboratory setting in which conditions other than those under study are effectively held constant across groups of participants receiving various levels of the experimental condition(s). The findings of the experiments were unable to be generalized outside of the field of the experiments. However, explanations of said studies are still required to prove their importance for understanding the subject matter. This is especially true when it comes to health consequences.

The link between pornography and sexual aggression has been the subject of multiple meta-analyses. Meta-analyses conducted in the 1990s by Allen et al. suggested to researchers that there might not be an association of any kind between pornography and rape supportive attitudes in non-experimental studies. They state that the analyses demonstrate a homogeneous set of results showing that pictorial nudity reduces subsequent violent behavior, but that depictions of nonviolent sexual behavior and media depictions of violent sexual activity increased aggressive behavior. However, a meta-analysis by Hald, Malamuth and Yuen (2000) suggests that there is a link between consumption of violent pornography and rape-supportive attitudes in certain populations of men, particularly when moderating variables are taken into consideration.

A meta-analysis conducted in 2015 found that pornography was associated with sexual aggression in a global scale towards both genders. Verbal aggression was done more frequently than physical aggression, albeit with the same impact. The patterns suggest that violent pornography could be the driving force behind these aggressive actions.

A literature review by Ferguson and Hartley in 2009 argued that it would be wise to let go of the notion that pornography contributes to increased sexual assault behavior. The authors stated that the experts of some studies tended to highlight positive findings while de-emphasizing null findings. They would then conclude that controlled studies, on balance, were not able to support links between pornography and sexual violence.

A 2019 systematic review by Marshall and Miller examined research conducted over the previous decade on the relationship between pornography use and sexual coercion. They concluded "Researchers have, in part, answered the call and provided ample evidence that pornography use and sexual coercion are in fact related, but until the field moves beyond a correlative understanding of this relationship, practical implications are limited." They also stated that research on pornography use is highly heterogeneous, with inconsistent methodologies and varying definitions that limit synthesis through meta-analyses, and recommended that future studies adopt standardized definitions to better clarify its effects.

Ferguson and Hartley updated their review with a 2020 meta-analysis. This meta-analysis concluded that mainstream pornography could not be linked to sexual violence and was associated with reductions in sexual violence at the societal level. Small correlations were found between violent porn viewing and sexual aggression, but evidence was unable to differentiate whether this was a causal or selection effect (i.e. sexual offenders seeking out violent porn).

In a 2021 review of studies, Rothman states "five studies found that the sexual violence perpetrators had seen less pornography than other criminals". The relation between sexual fantasies and committing offenses is not a simple one and there is not enough backing evidence to link violent pornography as the cause of rape.

==== Epidemiological studies ====
An epidemiological study describes the association between given behaviors or environmental conditions, and physical or psychological health by means of observation of real-world phenomena through statistical data. Epidemiological studies would generally be useful in describing real life events outside of the experimental field but would have a weak correlation with cause and effect relationships between specific behaviors and the health consequences.

Danish criminologist Berl Kutchinsky's Studies on Pornography and sex crimes in Denmark (1970), a scientific report ordered by the Presidential Commission on Obscenity and Pornography, found that the legalizing of pornography in Denmark had not resulted in an increase of sex crimes. In 1998 Milton Diamond from the University of Hawaii noted that in Japan, the number of reported cases of child sex abuse dropped markedly after the ban on sexually explicit materials was lifted in 1969; however, in Denmark and Sweden, there was a very slight increase in reported rapes after the liberalization of their pornography laws during the same time period, which scientists attribute to a higher awareness of what amounts to sex abuse.

Some researchers argue that there is a correlation between pornography and a decrease of sex crimes. The effects of Pornography: An International Perspective was an epidemiological study which found that the massive growth of the pornography industry in the United States between 1975 and 1995 was accompanied by a substantial decrease in the number of sexual assaults per capita – and reported similar results for Japan.

In 1986, a review of epidemiological studies by Neil Malamuth found that the quantity of pornographic material viewed by men was positively correlated with the degree to which they endorsed sexual assault. Malamuth's work describes Check (1984), who found among a diverse sample of Canadian men that more exposure to pornography led to higher acceptance of rape myths, violence against women, and general sexual callousness. In another study, Briere, Corne, Runtz and Neil M. Malamuth, (1984) reported similar correlations in a sample involving college males. On the other hand, the failure to find a statistically significant correlation in another previous study led Malamuth to examine other interesting correlations, which took into account the information about sexuality the samples obtained in their childhood, and pornography emerged as the second most important source of information. Malamuth's work has been criticized by other authors, however, such as Ferguson and Hartley (2009) who argue Malamuth has exaggerated positive findings and has not always properly discussed null findings. In a Quartz publication, Malamuth argued that porn is like alcohol: "whether it's bad for you depends on who you are" (stating that it increases violence in a few people, not in most people; it makes most people more relaxed).

A 2019 study from the Archives of Sexual behavior on Teen Dating Violence (TDV) found that both males and females are perpetrators in different regards. Males would more often engage in Sexual TDV, while females would more often engage in Physical and Emotional TDV. The Study mentions the analysis of two separate frameworks. One is the Confluence model of Sexual aggression, in which it details porn being the one that influences boys to be sexually aggressive. It works significantly towards the males that have fragile masculinity and the ones that are more sexually promiscuous. The other framework is the script acquisition, activation, application model (3AM) of sexual media socialization. This framework suggests that behavior towards sexual encounters is acquired through "scripts" that people get from viewing pornographic content. These actions, often negative, will then be mirrored. This will result in more sexual and teen dating violence.

A 2024 review found a correlation between pornography consumption (especially sado-masochistic pornography) and violence, but stated that the causality of the association remains unclear and that its own results have to be interpreted with caution, due to the heterogeneity of the research examined.

== Effects on relationships ==
The consumption of pornography has various impacts in different areas of a relationship. Pornography can influence an individual's relationship through a number of channels, including overall relationship satisfaction, communication within a relationship, and setting boundaries within a relationship.

Pornography's impact on relationship satisfaction has come under scrutiny, as findings range from negative correlations to positive effects. Pornography consumption has been correlated with less relationship satisfaction, sexual satisfaction, and less sexual desire for their partner in men. Other research reports positive findings for women who consume pornography more regularly, including increased relationship satisfaction and decreased distress.

=== Relationship satisfaction ===
The research on the correlation between pornography use and relationship satisfaction is varied. While some researchers believe that pornography consumption leads people to become less satisfied in their relationships, with greater frequency of use negatively associated with relationship satisfaction, others have argued that it can have the opposite effect. Pornography consumption tends to result in lower levels of satisfaction in long-term, heterosexual relationships. However, most of the current research is correlational, indicating a connected but non-causal relationship.

On the other hand, many researchers reject the idea that pornography is inherently harmful to relationship satisfaction. Joint pornography consumption within a relationship has been linked to increased levels of relationship satisfaction for both partners. This suggests that there is more at play than simply the consumption of pornography, such as the role of honesty and partner perception.

Research examining pornography use and relationship quality has found weak negative associations between the two. Across multiple measures, pornography use was either unassociated with relationship outcomes or negatively associated with them though significant associations were mostly small in magnitude; only one unclear exception showed a positive association. Researches mention the direction of causality remains unclear-whether pornography use contributes to relationship problems or whether individuals in troubled relationships turn to pornography as a coping mechanism.

Researchers report a statistically significant, but very low, negative correlation between sexual satisfaction and pornography use overall. When the results were disaggregated by gender, this negative correlation remained significant among women. However, the study found no statistically significant relationship between pornography use and sexual satisfaction among men.

=== Communication ===
Communication is a vital component of any healthy relationship, and many researchers question how pornography may impact the ability of a couple to communicate openly.

Another important aspect is the communication of affection within relationships. Affection Exchange Theory establishes the inherent role of affection within romantic relationships. Even in the role of survival, reproduction, and sexual selection. Trait attachment is positively associated with relationship satisfaction. Individuals who score higher in trait attachment report feeling and expressing greater sexual desire for their partners, compared to individuals who score lower. Some evidence indicates that the connection between Affection Exchange Theory and sexual desire is, in fact, stronger than the connection to relationship satisfaction, suggesting that sexual desire may have a crucial moderating role between the two.

== See also ==
- Effects of pornography on young people
- Meese Report – 1986 U.S. Attorney General's Commission on Pornography
- Pornographication – Mainstream absorption of sexualisation
- President's Commission on Obscenity and Pornography – 1969, United States
- Religious views on pornography
- Sexual ethics – Study of ethical conduct in sexual behavior
- Stanley v. Georgia – U.S. Supreme Court case that established a right to pornography
- Victorian morality – Accepted behaviour and norms in the Victorian era
- Williams Committee – 1979 UK Committee on Obscenity and Film Censorship

== Sources ==
- McKee, Alan; Litsou, Katerina; Byron, Paul; Ingham, Roger (2022). What Do We Know About the Effects of Pornography After Fifty Years of Academic Research?. London: Routledge. doi:10.4324/9781003232032. ISBN 978-1-003-23203-2.
- Rothman, Emily F. (2021). Pornography and Public Health. Oxford University Press. ISBN 978-0-19-007549-1.
