= Meese Report =

1986 report on the effects of pornography

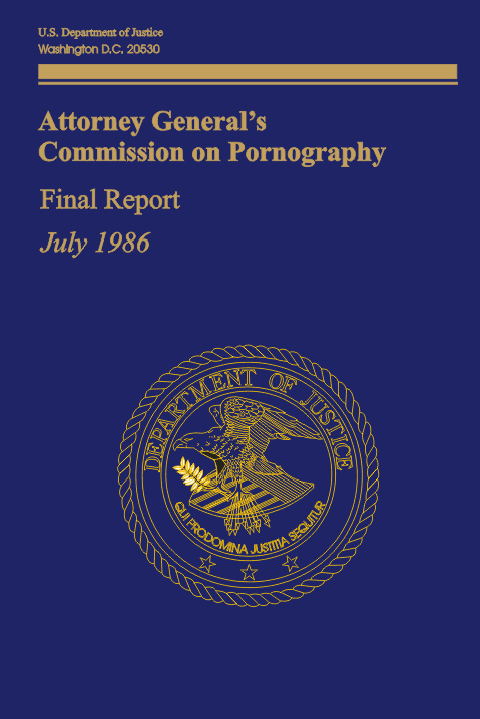
The cover of the Meese Report

The Meese Report (named for Edwin Meese), officially the Final Report of the Attorney General's Commission on Pornography, is the result of an investigation into pornography ordered by U.S. president Ronald Reagan. It was published in July 1986 and contains 1,960 pages.

The following people composed the Attorney General's Commission on Pornography (commonly called the Meese Commission):

- Henry E. Hudson, chairman
- Diane D. Cusack
- Park Elliott Dietz
- James Dobson
- Father Bruce Ritter
- Frederick Schauer
- Deanne Tilton-Durfee
- Judith V. Becker
- Ellen Levine
- Edward J. Garcia
- Tex Lezar
- Alan E. Sears

The report is divided into five parts and 35 chapters and details most aspects of the pornography industry, including the history of pornography and the extent of First Amendment protections. The report also documents what the committee found to be the harmful effects of pornography and connections between pornographers and organized crime. The report was criticized by many inside and outside the pornography industry, who called it biased, not credible, and inaccurate. The report along with revised prosecution tactics under Attorney General Meese was effective in reducing pornography markets in some jurisdictions prior to the Internet.

The "Meese Report" was preceded by the report of presidents Lyndon B. Johnson's and Richard Nixon's Commission on Obscenity and Pornography, which was published in 1970 and recommended loosening the legal restrictions on pornography.

== Playboy v. Meese ==
Prior to the Report's release, Meese Commission chairman Alan E. Sears sent letters on Commission letterhead to the heads of 23 convenience store chains and other companies, declaring that the Commission would find that they were distributors of pornography and threatening that they would be listed as such in the final Report. In fact, the list of purported distributors had been identified by Donald Wildmon, the head of the conservative Christian advocacy organization that later became the American Family Association. The letters triggered several companies to remove such common softcore pornography magazines as Playboy and Penthouse from store shelves. The American Booksellers Association, the Council for Periodical Distributors Associations, the Magazine Publishers of America, and the publishers of Playboy and Penthouse sued, arguing that the letters constituted prior restraint and were forbidden under the First Amendment. The U.S. District Court for the District of Columbia agreed, leading it to admonish the Commission, order it to withdraw the letter, and forbid it to issue any list of retailers in the report.

== See also ==
- Committee on Obscenity and Film Censorship
- Effects of pornography
- President's Commission on Obscenity and Pornography
