= Berl Kutchinsky =

Danish criminologist (1935–1995)

Berl Kutchinsky.
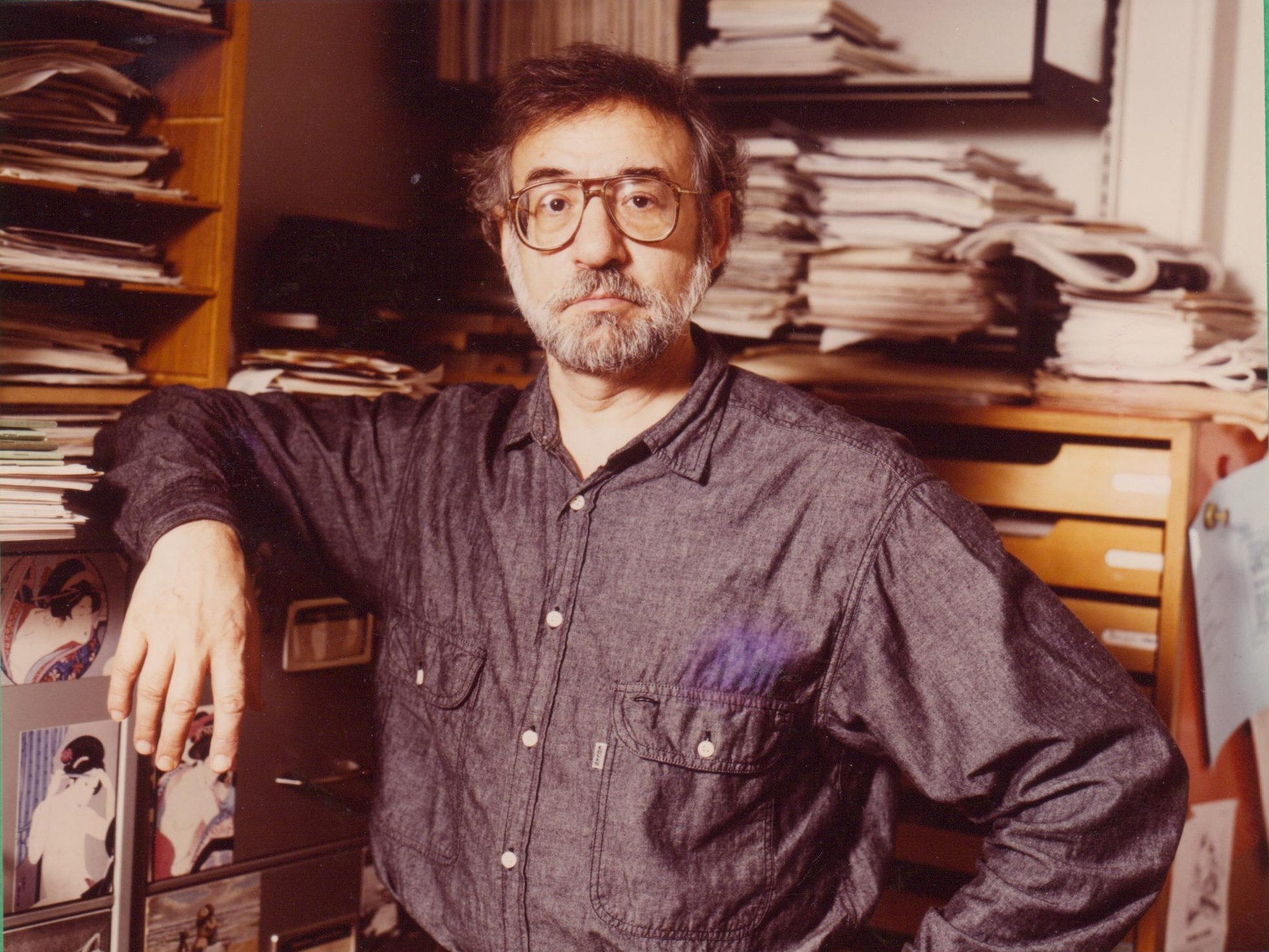
- Berl Kutchinsky
- Born: August 14, 1935; Aarhus, Denmark
- Died: March 9, 1995 (aged 59); Copenhagen, Denmark
- Known for: Public health effects of pornography
- Scientific career
- Fields: Criminology
- Workplaces: University of Copenhagen

Berl Kutchinsky (1935 – 1995) was a Danish Professor of Criminology at the University of Copenhagen. He became internationally famous for his studies in the public health effects of pornography.

He was based in Denmark, which in 1969 became the first country to legalize hardcore pornography Sweden followed suit in 1970, and West Germany in 1973. Kutchinsky was therefore in a unique position to study the effect of pornography on a massive scale. Over the next two decades Kutchinsky carried out extensive research into crime statistics in the three countries. His findings were that increased availability of pornography had not led to an increase in sexual violence. He found that the incidence of certain sex crimes had in fact fallen, including rates of child sexual abuse in Denmark.

His first work on the subject, Studies on Pornography and sex crimes in Denmark (1970), was a scientific report ordered by the United States' President's Commission on Obscenity and Pornography. It found that the legalizing of pornography in Denmark had not (as had been expected) resulted in an increase in sex crimes.

In 1980 he helped to draft the law which banned child pornography in Denmark; after which according to him, "Child porn has largely disappeared from Denmark." Berl Kutchinsky's last book, Law, pornography, and crime: The Danish experience, was edited by his colleague Annika Snare and published posthumously in 1999.

== Selected works ==
- Studies on Pornography and sex crimes in Denmark (New Social Science Monographs, Denmark 1970)
- Obscenity and Pornography: Behavioral Aspects, In: Encyclopedia of Crime and Justice, Vol. 3, pp 1077–1086 (The Free Press, Macmillan, New York 1983)
- Pornography and its Effects in Denmark and the United States: A Rejoinder and Beyond, in: Comparative Social Research, vol. 8, pp. 301–30 (JAI Press, US 1985)
- Som hånd i hanke, In: Hug nr. 42/43 (Tiderne Skifter, Denmark 1985)
- Big sister is watching!, In: Umoralske opstød - 15 debatindlæg om s/m, pornografi og nypuritanisme (Juvelen, Denmark 1986)
- Legalised pornography in Denmark, In: Men Confronting Pornography, pp. 233–45, 335-6 (Crown Publishers, New York 1990)
- Pornography and rape: Theory and practice? Evidence from crime data in four countries where pornography is easily available, In: International Journal of Law and Psychiatry, vol. 14, 1991, no. 1 & 2, pp. 47–64. (1991)
- Pornography, Sex Crime and Public Policy (Institute of Criminology and Criminal Science, University of Copenhagen, Denmark 1991)
- Den pornografiske scene, In: Social Kritik nr. 64, June 1999 (Selskabet til fremme af Social Debat, Denmark 1999)
- Law, pornography, and crime: The Danish experience (Pax Forlag, Oslo 1999)
