= Substance Use & Misuse =

- Discipline: Addiction medicine
- Language: English
- Edited by: Stephen Magura

Publication details
- Former name(s): International Journal of the Addictions
- History: 1966-present
- Publisher: Taylor & Francis
- Frequency: 14/year
- Impact factor: 1.132 (2017)

Standard abbreviations
- ISO 4: Subst. Use Misuse

Indexing
- CODEN: SUMIFL
- ISSN: 1082-6084 (print); 1532-2491 (web)
- LCCN: 2006268261
- OCLC no.: 901021821

Links
- Journal homepage; Online access; Online archive

Substance Use & Misuse is a peer-reviewed medical journal covering substance abuse. It was established in 1966 as the International Journal of the Addictions, obtaining its current name in 1996. It is published 14 times per year by Taylor & Francis and the editor-in-chief is Stephen Magura (Western Michigan University). According to the Journal Citation Reports, the journal has a 2017 2-year impact factor of 1.132.
