= Effects of pornography on young people =

The effects of pornography on young people include impacts on wellbeing, sexual practices, attitudes, and social relationships. Knowledge about this topic is tentative due to a lack of empirical studies, and there are major ethical objections to performing such studies. Correlational findings exist regarding minors' exposure to pornography, but no conclusive evidence of causation has been established. The existing evidence cannot assert any medical diagnosis, nor other psychiatric claims of being harmful; the evidence is too weak to really support anything. Instead, there are many unfounded claims, suppositions, and speculations. Obstacles to performing such research are insurmountable, thus it could possibly never be known. (Note: According to McKee et al., "Much of the research on pornography has been normative; it has assumed that the only healthy form of sexuality is vanilla sex (that is, not kinky) between monogamous couple-based partners for reasons beyond simply pleasure.") A causal relationship could never be shown.

== Research ==
Although some literature exists on traditional forms of media (e.g., television, radio, magazines), the empirical research that examines the impact on children of exposure to non-violent sexual material is extremely limited.

— Dick Thornburgh and Herbert S. Lin (2002), Youth, Pornography, and the Internet

[...] more recent rates of teen intercourse and sexual assault have declined considerably [...] Between 1991 and 2009, the teen birth rate dropped by 33 percent.

— Tarrant (2016)

Adolescents who used pornography more frequently were male, at a more advanced pubertal stage, sensation seekers, and had weak or troubled family relations. Pornography use was associated with more permissive sexual attitudes and tended to be linked with stronger gender-stereotypical sexual beliefs. It also seemed to be related to the occurrence of sexual intercourse, greater experience with casual sex behavior, and more sexual aggression, both in terms of perpetration and victimization.

— Peter and Valkenburg (2016)

Peter and Valkenburg say the findings of the review "currently precludes internally valid causal conclusions" due to various methodological and theoretical shortcomings in the studies reviewed.

The majority of studies in this field are cross-sectional surveys of low quality.

— Marks, Murray, and Estacio (2018)

A 2019 review found that LGBTQ teenagers consume pornography much more often than heterosexual teenagers, but the LGBTQ teenagers are not more negatively impacted by it than heterosexual teenagers.

Brown and Wisco's (2019) systematic review reached similar conclusions to Peter and Valkenburg: causality cannot get established. Brown and Wisco blamed the lack of empirical studies for being unable to draw definitive conclusions. Brown and Wisco concluded that "The literature suggests that the adolescent brain may indeed be more sensitive to sexually explicit material, but due to a lack of empirical studies this question cannot be answered definitively." This essentially confirms the thesis from Not in Front of the Children: harmful to minors (2001) is an often heard claim which completely lacks evidence. There are considerable ethical problems with performing such research. Since those problems are a huge obstacle, it is likely that such research will not be allowed, thus possibly it could never be known. Rory Reid (UCLA) declared "Universities don't want their name on the front page of a newspaper for an unethical study exposing minors to porn."

The PhD thesis (2020) of Marleen J.E. Katayama-Klaassen, at the University of Amsterdam, found a low correlation between views upon sexuality and pornography consumption, and could not show causality.

A 2020 systematic review of reviews examining pornography use and sexting identified some evidence of associations between pornography use and sexting, as well as links to sexual attitudes and behaviors. However, the evidence was often inconsistent and derived primarily from cross-sectional observational studies, meaning no causal relationships could be established.

For example, when a 15-year-old youth who has not had a conversation about sex with one's parents and gets sent to a therapist because the youth was caught looking at pornography by the parent/s can cause unnecessary psychological distress to the youth.

— McKay, Poulin, and Muñoz-Laboy (2021), Claiming Public Health Crisis to Regulate Sexual Outlets: A Critique of the State of Utah's Declaration on Pornography

A 2021 review which compiled evidence from other empirical sources such as surveys found that representations of women in pornography may lead adolescent boys to view women mainly as sexual objects, with probable repercussions for gender equality. The review, however, nowhere claims that it has shown a causal relationship from mainstream pornography viewing to perspectives furthering gender inequality. Besides, it nowhere states if the correlation found is large or small, numbers for it are not given either.

According to Dennis Howitt (2022), speaking about rapists, "Offenders use pornography, but developmental studies tend not to hold pornography responsible for creating their deviance."

Many young people use pornography as a substitute for sexual education. No definitive conclusions can be drawn regarding unprotected or paid sex, but teenage pregnancy and sexually transmitted diseases have been associated with pornography use (the review states verbatim "causal inference could not be made").

A 2023 systematic review of 19 studies found a statistically significant association between pornography exposure and earlier age of first sex (before age 16) in adolescents aged 10-19 years. However, the authors state that most studies were cross-sectional or had substantial methodological limitations, currently precluding causal conclusions, and measurement of pornography exposure varied across studies. Evidence regarding other sexual behavior outcomes, including condom use, number of sexual partners, sexual aggression, and sexually transmitted infections, was either conflicting or insufficient to draw conclusions. The authors concluded that more quantitative research is needed and that sex education should "adopt evidence-based approaches to minimize the potential harms from pornography."

Figures from the Netherlands in 2023: young men watched porn in the previous six months between 65% (13–15 years) and 96% (22–24 years), and young women between 22% (13–15 years) and 75% (22–24 years old).

In an examination of three Swedish surveys among high-school seniors, Svedin et al. found that watching deviant pornography was associated with worse mental health among boys in two surveys and among girls in one survey. In one survey, both infrequent and frequent pornography watching showed increased risk for poor mental health compared to moderate watching among boys. Factors such as parental unemployment, controlling parenting, and sexual abuse were more consistently associated with poor mental health than solely pornography consumption by itself.

A 2023 review found that teenagers consider watching pornography a normal part of life, but at the same time they could develop unrealistic views of sexuality due to it.

Jonny Hunt (2024) states that there is no empirical evidence supporting the public claims made by porn prohibitionists and NoFap advocates, stating their claims lack scientific basis. Hunt (2024) said about various claims that pornography harms the youth: "However, findings have been inconsistent, with limited evidence to support any of these claims, especially in terms of young people (Martyniuk & Stulhofer, 2018; Vandenbosch & van Oosten, 2018; Štulhofer et al., 2019). [...] Firstly, there seems to be an implication that pornography exists in a vacuum and does not itself reflect the cultural norms and sexual scripts available and constructed elsewhere in society (Simon & Gagnon, 2003)."

In a 2024 systematic review of peer-reviewed articles published between 2000 and 2022, researchers said:

We could determine associations between pornography consumption and demographic variables (e.g., age, gender), personal characteristics (e.g., [sexual] sensation seeking, sexual interest and experience, general risk behavior), environmental variables (e.g., peers, family), attitudes (e.g., gender role attitudes, permissive sexual attitudes), behavior (e.g. sexual risk behaviour, sexting) and sexual aggression (e.g., sexual cybervictimization, grooming).

— Paulus et al. (2024), The impact of Internet pornography on children and adolescents: A systematic review

Paulus et al. also found that "girls have a more negative attitude towards pornography than boys who have an ambivalent opinion on the subject. Most adolescents are aware that the majority of pornographic material is exaggerated and unrealistic. Furthermore, pornography is not only watched out of curiosity and for sexual arousal but also used as a source of sexual information, especially by minority groups." They also mentioned "The results found in this review are often contradictory."

A 2025 systematic review of longitudinal studies on adolescent pornography use found heterogeneous results, with some studies indicating significant associations between pornography use and various outcomes (including sexual behaviors, sexual aggression, and life satisfaction), while other results were inconsistent. The review concluded that further research is needed to clarify relationships between types and patterns of pornography use in adolescents.

A 2025 public policy research, including about teenagers using pornographic media, says "The evidence to substantiate these assertions remains preliminary" (causality cannot be shown). That is, the existing evidence does not support public policy stances about how teenagers use media. However, the review did not concentrate upon pornography use, and just mentioned it passingly.

According to a 2025 review, "most young people have used internet pornography, with a higher prevalence reported in men than women." Also, "rather than assuming that pornography consumption is inherently beneficial or harmful, it is important to recognise the diverse and multidimensional nature of its impact."

A 2025 review shows a moderate correlation between pornography consumption in young people and psychological problems; it does not claim that pornography would be the cause of such problems. The researchers found no significant difference based on gender and stated that "in its most problematic manifestations, online pornography use among adolescents may serve as a maladaptive coping strategy for managing underlying distress."

A 2026 systematic review found correlations between anxiety, depression, and pornography consumption, especially for young people, but causality cannot get established.

== See also ==
- Harmful to Minors, book by Judith Levine
- Not in Front of the Children, book by Marjorie Heins
