= Neil Malamuth =

American psychologist

- Education: University of California, Los Angeles
- Known for: Sexual violence Effects of pornography
- Awards: 1987 John Kendall Award for contributions to psychology from Gustavus Adolphus College
- Scientific career
- Fields: Evolutionary psychology
- Institutions: University of California, Los Angeles
- Thesis: A Systematic analysis of the relationship between group shifts and characteristics of the choice dilemmas questionnaire (1975)
- Notable students: Bruce J. Ellis

Neil Moshe Malamuth is a professor of psychology at the University of California, Los Angeles, known for his research on sexual violence and the effects of pornography on its viewers. He is a fellow of the American Psychological Association and the American Psychological Society.

== Education and early career ==
Malamuth earned his bachelor's, master's and Ph.d degrees in psychology at UCLA, where early research appointments at the Center for Computer-Based Behavioral Studies and training in behavior therapy grounded his career in experimental rigor and applied relevance.

== Academic career ==
After initial teaching and research posts at UCLA in the 1970s, Malamuth joined the University of Manitoba, serving as assistant and then associate professor of psychology.

He returned to UCLA in the early 1980s as a faculty member in Communication and psychology, and soon took on academic leadership as chair of the Communication Studies Program and of the Speech Department.

From 1991 to 1994, he was professor and chair of Communication at the University of Michigan, where he was also affiliated with the Institute for Social Research.

He rejoined UCLA in 1994 and remained there through the rest of his career, chairing Communication Studies for more than a decade and holding affiliations with the Center for the Study of Women and the UCLA Center for Society and Genetics.

== Research ==
Malamuth is known for the Confluence Model of sexual aggression. The model identifies two primary risk pathways: hostile masculinity, marked by distrust, dominance, and hostility toward women, and impersonal sexuality, characterized by emotionally detached, promiscuous sexual behavior, and shows that their interaction sharply elevates the likelihood of sexually aggressive conduct. In subsequent studies, he and collaborators demonstrated that secondary influences such as pornography exposure, peer norms, substance use, and low empathy tend to heighten risk primarily among men who are already high on the two core traits.
