= Dennis Howitt =

British psychologist

Dennis Howitt is a British psychologist. He is a reader in Applied Psychology at Loughborough University and the author of numerous psychology textbooks. He is a chartered forensic psychologist and a Fellow of the British Psychological Society. His publications also include books on statistics, computing and methodology.

== Life and career ==
Howitt completed a first class honours degree in psychology at Brunel University in 1967 and earned his PhD at the University of Sussex. In 1970 he became research officer at Leicester University's Centre for Mass Communication Research. His research career began with the study of mass communications, especially with reference to crime, violence and pornography, but he has since broadened his research to the application of psychology to social issues.

He has also written on racism in the field of psychology, as well as forensic psychology, specifically paedophiles, sex offenders, and child abuse.

== Selected publications ==
- Howitt D, Cramer D (2011). Introduction to SPSS Statistics in Psychology. Pearson Education, ISBN 978-0-273-73426-0
- Howitt D (2010). Introduction to qualitative methods in psychology. Prentice Hall, ISBN 978-0-13-206874-1
- Howitt D (2009). Introduction to forensic and criminal psychology. Pearson Education, ISBN 978-1-4058-7446-5
- Hair JF, Tabachnick BG, Howitt D (2009). Mixed ANOVA and multiple regression: Readings. Pearson Australia, ISBN 978-1-4425-2392-0
- Howitt D, Cramer D (2009). Introduction to Research Methods in Psychology. Prentice Hall, ISBN 978-0-13-205163-7
- Howitt D, Cramer D (2009). Introduction to Statistics in Psychology. Prentice Hall, ISBN 978-0-13-205161-3
- Sheldon K, Dennis Howitt D (2007). Sex offenders and the Internet. John Wiley and Sons, ISBN 978-0-470-02800-1
- Howitt D, Cramer D (2005). Introduction to SPSS in psychology. Pearson Prentice Hall, ISBN 978-0-13-139986-0
- Cramer D, Howitt D (2004). The Sage dictionary of statistics. SAGE, ISBN 978-0-7619-4138-5
- Howitt D (2004). What is the role of fantasy in sex offending? Crim Behav Ment Health. 2004;14(3):182-8. PMID 15614321
- Howitt D (2002). Forensic and criminal psychology. Prentice Hall, ISBN 978-0-13-016985-3
- Owusu-Bempah K, Howitt D (2000). Psychology beyond Western perspectives. Wiley-Blackwell, ISBN 978-1-85433-328-5
- Howitt D, Cramer D (2000). First steps in research and statistics: A practical workbook for psychology students. Psychology Press, ISBN 978-0-415-20101-8
- Howitt D, Cramer D (2000). An introduction to statistics in psychology: A complete guide for students (2nd ed.). Prentice Hall, ISBN 978-0-13-017314-0
- Howitt, D (1998). Crime, the media and the law. Wiley. ISBN 978-0-471-96905-1
- Howitt D, Cramer D (1997). A guide to computing statistics with SPSS for Windows. Prentice Hall/Harvester Wheatsheaf, ISBN 978-0-13-729197-7
- Howitt D (1995). Paedophiles and sexual offences against children. J. Wiley. ISBN 978-0-471-93939-9
- Howitt D (1995). Pornography and the paedophile: is it criminogenic? Br J Med Psychol. 1995 Mar;68 (Pt 1):15-27. PMID 7779766
- Howitt D, Owusu-Bempah K (1994). The racism of psychology. Harvester Wheatsheaf. ISBN 978-0-7450-1352-7
- Howitt D (1992). Child abuse errors: when good intentions go wrong. Harvester Wheatsheaf, ISBN 978-0-7450-1044-1
- Howitt D (1991). Concerning psychology: psychology applied to social issues. Open University Press, ISBN 978-0-335-09373-1
- Howitt D (1990). Britain's "substance abuse policy": realities and regulation in the United Kingdom. Int J Addict. 1990-1991;25(3A):353-76. PMID 2289842
- Cumberbatch G, Howitt D( 1989). A measure of uncertainty: the effects of the mass media. J. Libbey, ISBN 978-0-86196-231-0
- Howitt D (1982). The mass media and social problems. Pergamon Press, ISBN 978-0-08-026759-3
- Howitt D Cumberbatch G (1975). Mass media, violence and society. Wiley, ISBN 978-0-470-41745-4
- Howitt D Cumberbatch G (1972). Affective feeling for a film character and evaluation of an anti-social act. Br J Soc Clin Psychol. 1972 Jun;11(2):102-8. PMID 5051316
