= President's Commission on Obscenity and Pornography =

United States Congress funded commission

In 1969, the Supreme Court of the United States ruled in Stanley v. Georgia that people could view whatever they wished in the privacy of their own homes. In response, the United States Congress funded the President's Commission on Obscenity and Pornography, set up by President Lyndon B. Johnson to study pornography.

== Aims ==
The Commission was established to study and report on:

- "Constitutional and definitional problems related to obscenity controls."
- "Traffic in and distribution of obscene and pornographic materials."
- "The effects of such material, particularly on youth, and their relationship to crime and other antisocial conduct."

== Composition ==
Initially, the Commission consisted of Edward E. Elson, Thomas D. Gill, Edward D. Greenwood, Reverend Morton A. Hill, S.J., G. William Jones, Joseph T. Klapper, Otto N. Larsen, Rabbi Irving Lehrman, Freeman Lewis, Reverend Winfrey C. Link, Morris A. Lipton, William B. Lockhart (chair), Thomas C. Lynch, Barbara Scott, Cathryn A. Speits, Frederick Herbert Wagman, Kenneth Keating and Marvin Wolfgang.

Subsequently, K. Keating was replaced with Charles Keating, Jr, by President Richard Nixon.

Wm. Cody Wilson served as Executive Director of the Commission, directing both surveys of existing research and original empirical esearch on the subject.

== Studies undertaken ==
The Commission commissioned Berl Kutchinsky to perform a scientific study on the subject. His report, titled Studies on Pornography and Sex Crimes in Denmark (1970), found that legalizing pornography in Denmark had not (as had been expected) resulted in an increase of sex crimes.

== Findings ==
The Commission's report, called Report of the Commission on Obscenity and Pornography, and published in 1970, recommended sex education, funding of research into the effects of pornography and restriction of children's access to pornography, and recommended against any restrictions for adults. On balance the report found that obscenity and pornography were not important social problems, that there was no evidence that exposure to such material was harmful to individuals, and that current legal and policy initiatives were more likely to create problems than solve them.

The report was widely criticized and rejected by Congress. The Senate rejected the Commission's findings and recommendations by a 60–5 vote, with 34 abstentions. The Senate rejected the following findings and recommendations in particular:

- That there was "no evidence to date that exposure to explicit sexual materials plays a significant role in the causation of delinquent or criminal behavior among youths or adults."
- That "a majority of American adults believe that adults should be allowed to read or see any sexual materials they wish."
- That "there is no reason to suppose that elimination of governmental prohibitions upon the sexual materials which may be made available to adults would adversely affect the availability to the public of other books, magazines, or films."
- That there was no "evidence that exposure to explicit sexual materials adversely affects character or moral attitudes regarding sex and sexual conduct."
- That "Federal, State, and Local legislation prohibiting the sale, exhibition, or distribution of sexual materials to consenting adults should be repealed."

President Nixon, who had succeeded Johnson in 1969, also emphatically rejected the report.

== Aftermath ==
In 1970, Earl Kemp published an illustrated edition of the Presidential Report of the Commission on Obscenity and Pornography through a publishing company owned by William Hamling called Greenleaf Classics.

The 1969 President's Commission on Obscenity and Pornography issued its un-illustrated 656-page report on September 30, 1970. One month later, the report went on sale at the Government Printing Office. On November 11, 1970, copies of publisher William Hamling's Greenleaf Classics’ 352-page The Illustrated Presidential Report of the Commission on Obscenity and Pornography were printed, and two weeks later, on Monday, December 13, 1970, went on sale throughout the U.S. for $12.50.

Kemp and Hamling were eventually sentenced to prison for "conspiracy to mail obscene material," but both served only the federal minimum.

Hamling received a four-year regular adult sentence. Earl Kemp received a sentence of three years and one day. The report as published by Greenleaf was not found to be obscene. Nonetheless, on the other hand the brochure was found to be clearly obscene by the jury. Of some note, Earl Kemp was in Europe at the time Hamling created and mailed the ad brochure.

== See also ==
- Effects of pornography
- Meese Report, 1986 U.S. Attorney General's Commission on Pornography
- Stanley v. Georgia, U.S. Supreme Court case that established a right to pornography
- Williams Committee, 1979 U.K. Committee on Obscenity and Film Censorship
