= E (2025 film) =

2025 Finnish drama film

- Directed by: Anna Eriksson
- Written by: Anna Eriksson
- Produced by: Matti Pyykkö
- Starring: Anna Eriksson; Parco Lee; Johannes Haasbroek; Elize van Huyssteen
- Cinematography: Matti Pyykkö
- Edited by: Anna Eriksson
- Music by: Anna Eriksson
- Production company: Ihode Management Ltd
- Distributed by: Pirkanmaan elokuvakeskus
- Release dates: 9 August 2025 (Locarno); 26 September 2025 (Finland)
- Running time: 86 minutes
- Country: Finland
- Languages: Swedish; English

E is a Finnish experimental drama film directed and written by musician and filmmaker Anna Eriksson. It is the concluding part of Eriksson's letter trilogy, with the previous installments being M (2018) and W (2022). The trilogy explores themes of femininity, power, sexuality, and the subconscious through cinematic expression.

E tells the story of Finland's former prime minister, Eva Vogler, who causes a scandal at the Nobel Gala and disappears into a desolate desert of the real. In the desert, she meets her doppelgänger and other lost characters.

The film is produced by Ihode Management Ltd with Matti Pyykkö as the producer. The distribution of the film is handled by Pirkanmaan elokuvakeskus. It is set to release theatrically in September 2025.

The film premiered at the 2025 Locarno Film Festival.

== Cast ==
- Anna Eriksson
- Parco Lee
- Johannes Haasbroek
- Elize van Huyssteen
- Jooseppi Pyykkö

== Release ==
E had its World Premiere at the 78th Locarno Film Festival on 9 August 2025, in Fuori Concorso section.

The film will be released in Finnish theaters on 26 September 2025.

== Additional information ==
"Desert of the real" is a phrase originally coined in the philosophical treatise Simulacra and Simulation by Jean Baudrillard.
