= Reel Power: Hollywood Cinema and American Supremacy =

2010 book by Matthew Alford

Reel Power
- First edition
- Author: Matthew Alford
- Published: September 2010 Pluto Press (English); January 2013 (Chinese); September 2018 (French); April 2023 (French)
- Publication place: United Kingdom
- Pages: 218 (paperback)
- ISBN: 978-0-7453-2982-6 (UK)

Reel Power: Hollywood Cinema and American Supremacy is a 2010 book by Matthew Alford, which argues that even many of the most politically subversive films, such as Hotel Rwanda, Thirteen Days and Three Kings, provide favourable mythology for the United States' government. Alford draws attention to the power of corporate moguls and the role of the government in the production of films, such as Black Hawk Down, Terminator Salvation, and Transformers. Published in English by Pluto Press with a foreword by Michael Parenti, the book was subsequently translated into Chinese. A French edition, Hollywood Propaganda: Cinéma hollywoodien et hégémonie américaine, appeared in 2018 with a new introduction, followed by a further French edition, Final Cut, in 2023 with a new preface.

== Reception ==
In the British Morning Star, James Walsh commented that the book "is an engaging look at the innards of the dream factory process" and that although the revelations of film-maker collusion with the Pentagon are not surprising "the details are fascinating" especially in relation to "films traditionally considered nuanced or critical of US foreign policy".

The Journal of Popular Culture called it "One part cultural studies analysis, and another part expose", adding that it "offers a salient critique for those who are concerned about the long term implications of the power of film to act as site of ideological instruction". Contemporary Sociology said that Matthew Alford's insights were "particularly rare and startling", calling it "an attractive and up-to-date set of tools for the critical literacy that should be mandatory in today's media-saturated environments". Simon Kinnear from Total Film gave Reel Power four stars out of five and called it a "laudable study" and "an eye opening expose". "Alford's occasionally guilty of straw-clutching", he said, "but you'll watch the next gung-ho blockbuster a little closer". In Lobster Magazine, Robin Ramsay observed that "If Alford isn't quite describing the corporations and the state running joint psy-ops, it will do until joint psy-ops come along". Ramsay reviewed the book as "competently done, decently written and, if you've seen a lot of American movies – and I have – it is interesting to have the ideological content articulated. I could do it myself, and I'm sort of subliminally aware of it; but most of the time I'm just watching the movie. So the author's considerable efforts are both useful and entertaining."

== Criticisms ==
Roy Stafford, former editor of In the Picture magazine, says that Reel Power is a "solid introduction" to Hollywood and American politics but one which is a journalistic popularisation of Alford's more overtly academic work and as such, he implies , "renders much that Film Studies has tried to do over the last fifty years... as effectively wasted effort."

In The Scotsman, Hannah McGill, artistic director of the Edinburgh International Film Festival, opined that Reel Power "has its valid points to make [and] is at its best when it identifies and analyses cases of direct influence being brought to bear on film production by the US political establishment [...] its stonewalling of more contentious projects [...] or individuals in positions of constant influence" but that "I felt, on frequent occasion, as if I was in the company of the character Jane Horrocks played in Mike Leigh's Life is Sweet: the moodily self-righteous teen who hurled the word 'FASCIST!' at anyone who failed to mirror her every conviction and desire."

== National Security Cinema ==
National Security Cinema: The Shocking New Evidence of Government Control in Hollywood, by Matthew Alford and Tom Secker, uses the Freedom of Information Act to establish in more detail how certain films and TV shows have been affected by the state. It was published in Persian in 2018 by Saqi, translated by Muhammad Ali Shafii. An expanded French edition, L'Empire vous divertit: Comment la CIA et le Pentagone utilisent Hollywood, was published by Investig'Action in 2021 with a new preface and four additional case studies.

The book also formed the basis for the documentary film Theaters of War, released by the Media Education Foundation in 2022.

Director Oliver Stone recommended the book to Louis Theroux and commented: "I wasn't aware of the infiltration of Hollywood by the Pentagon and the CIA... it's a bigger racket than you think"

== See also ==
- Investigative journalism
- Military-industrial complex
