= Nasukh =

Nasukh may refer to:

- Nasukh (book), a book by Mohammad Rasouli
- Nasukh (film), a surreal short film by Asghar Abbasi
