= Jackson Katz =

American educator, filmmaker, and author (born 1960)

Jackson T. Katz
- Born: May 7, 1960 (age 66)
- Education: University of Massachusetts Amherst, Harvard University (Ed.M.); University of California, Los Angeles (Ph.D.)
- Spouse: Shelley Eriksen
- Website: http://www.jacksonkatz.com

Jackson T. Katz (born May 7, 1960) is an American educator, filmmaker, and author. Katz's work centers on violence, media, masculinities, and media literacy. He has created a gender violence prevention and education program, "Mentors in Violence Prevention", which is used by the U.S. military and sports organizations. He has made several documentaries on the representation of men and women in media.

== Early life and education ==
Katz is a former high school football player from Swampscott, Massachusetts. The first man to minor in women's studies at the University of Massachusetts-Amherst, Katz holds a master's degree from the Harvard Graduate School of Education, and a Ph.D. in cultural studies and education from UCLA, where he studied with Douglas Kellner.

== Work ==
From 1988 to 1998, Katz oversaw Real Men, a grass-roots organization against sexism in Boston.

Katz co-founded Mentors in Violence Prevention (MVP) in 1993 at Northeastern University's Center for the Study of Sport in Society. MVP has been implemented by college athletic programs, professional teams such as the New England Patriots and Boston Red Sox, NASCAR, and the United States Marine Corps. His company, MVP Strategies, distributes gender violence prevention training materials to U.S. school districts, municipalities, human service programs, corporations, law enforcement agencies, and military services. Katz has appeared on "Good Morning America," "The Oprah Winfrey Show" and "ABC News 20/20." In March 2000, Secretary of Defense William S. Cohen appointed him to the U.S. Secretary of Defense's Task Force on Domestic Violence in the Military, where he served from 2000-2003.

Katz advocates for a bystander intervention approach to preventing violence and bullying, including school bullying. Instead of focusing on women as victims and men as perpetrators of harassment, abuse or violence, the bystander approach concentrates on the role of peers in schools, groups, teams, workplaces and other social units.

=== Documentaries ===
Katz is the creator of educational videos for high school and college students produced and distributed through the Media Education Foundation:

- Tough Guise: Men, Violence and the Crisis in Masculinity (1999) (with Sut Jhally). The video was named one of the Top Ten Young Adult Videos for 2000 by the American Library Association.
- Wrestling with Manhood: Boys, Bullying & Battering (2002) (with Sut Jhally). The video analyzes the gender and sexual politics of professional wrestling.
- Spin the Bottle: Sex, Lies, and Alcohol (2004) (with Jean Kilbourne). The video examines media representations of gender and sexuality in beer commercials, Hollywood films and other media.
- Tough Guise 2: Violence, Manhood & American Culture (2013). The video examines toxic masculinity and masculine violence.

He is also featured in such documentaries as Byron Hurt's Hip Hop: Beyond Beats and Rhymes (2007), Thomas Keith's Generation M: Misogyny in Media & Culture (2008), and Jennifer Siebel Newsom's Miss Representation (2011).

== Bibliography ==
- Katz, Jackson (1995). "Reconstructing Masculinity in the Locker Room: The Mentors in Violence Prevention Project". Harvard Educational Review. 65 (2): 163–174. doi:10.17763/haer.65.2.55533188520136u1.
- Katz, Jackson (2006). The Macho Paradox: Why Some Men Hurt Women and How All Men Can Help. Naperville: Sourcebooks. ISBN 978-1-4022-0401-2.
- Katz, Jackson (2009). "Politics is a Contact Sport". In Hammer, Rhonda; Kellner, Douglas (eds.). Media/Cultural Studies: Critical Approaches. New York: Peter Lang. ISBN 978-0-8204-9526-2.
- Katz, Jackson (2010), "Advertising and the construction of violent white masculinity: from BMWs to Bud Light", in Dines, Gail; Humez, Jean M. (eds.), Gender, race and class in media: a critical reader (3rd ed.), California: SAGE, pp. 261–270, ISBN 9781412974417.
- Katz, Jackson (2015), "Engaging men in prevention of violence against women", in Johnson, Holly; Fisher, Bonnie S.; Jaquier, Véronique (eds.), Critical issues on violence against women: international perspectives and promising strategies, London: Routledge, pp. 233–243, ISBN 9781135006037.
