= The Writer with No Hands =

- Directed by: William Westaway
- Starring: Claudia Christian; John Irvin; Haskell Wexler
- Music by: Lorenzo Tomio
- Production company: Drum Roll Films
- Release date: 27 June 2017
- Running time: 71 minutes; 55 minutes (TV)

The Writer with No Hands is a 2017 British documentary feature film, which follows unemployed academic Matthew Alford as he tries to establish that the accidental death of Hollywood screenwriter Gary DeVore was, in fact, an assassination by the United States government.

The film was screened at venues on 27 June 2017 to commemorate the twentieth anniversary of DeVore's fate and a television edit subsequently shown on VGTV, Rialto Channel, and Means TV.

== Background ==
On Friday 27 June 1997, Gary DeVore had been driving home after completing a new film script. He was last seen at a Denny's diner in the Mojave Desert around 1am on the 28th. The subsequent manhunt remained unsuccessful until July 1998 when an amateur detective located fragments of DeVore's car next to the California Aqueduct near Palmdale.

The California Highway Patrol's investigation concluded that DeVore must have driven against oncoming traffic along the highway, crashed into the water and drowned in his vehicle.

== Production ==
In 2016, director William Westaway raised £4,769 through a successful Kickstarter campaign to fund completion of technical aspects to the production.

An alternative 86 minute cut feature had premiered at Hot Docs in 2014 but was pulled from the festival circuit at the end of that year, heavily re-worked, and never distributed. Although Alford produced the 2014 version of the documentary, he characterised the filmmaking process as highly erratic and was not similarly accredited on the final film.

== Reception ==
=== Critical response ===
The 2014 cut prompted concerns about taste. Cineinstyle called the documentary "riveting" but added "I wouldn't want to be Westaway's friend - or enemy". It was also dubbed a "sour" and "dubious" product that "borders on unethical".

The Morning Star called the final film "unmissable" and "as tense and telling as any Hollywood fiction".

=== Awards and nominations ===
- The 2014 cut premiered in the Future Cult Classics strand at Hot Docs. It was awarded the Golden Lantern at the 2014 Ammar International Popular Film Festival.
- In 2017–2018, the film won Best Documentary at the Vienna Independent Film Festival and the Creation International Film Festival and was runner-up in the same category at the Beloit International Film Festival.

== Related work ==
The documentary portrayed Alford as abruptly abandoning his research project in favour of an entertainment career. In 2020, he presented a comical version of The Writer with No Hands at the online Edinburgh Fringe and played himself as a "mediocre stand-up comedian" in a docufiction short called Eagle Kill in which he is recruited by Jeremy Corbyn to kidnap the US President. Alford went on to co-produce the documentary Theaters of War about the role of the CIA and Department of Defence in rewriting Hollywood and network TV scripts.
