= Ammar International Popular Film Festival =

Film festival in Iran

Ammar Popular Film Festival
- Location: Tehran, Iran
- Founded: 2010
- Founded by: Vahid Jalili
- Festival date: December 31- January 07
- Website: https://ammarfilm.ir/

Ammar International Popular Film Festival (AIPFF) has been held since 2010 in Tehran, Iran and showcased international documentary film, fictions, animations, clips, music videos, photo albums and other kinds of media with a focus on social and economic issues. Notable contributing filmmakers have included Danny Schechter and John Pilger.

Nader Talebzadeh is founder and secretary of the festival. The head of AIPFF Policy Council is the Iranian writer and film critic Vahid Jalili The festival was introduced from the outset as a revolutionary alternative to Iranian documentary cinema.

== Origin ==
The name derives from Ammar, one of the companions of the Islamic Prophet, who is said to have favored truth and resolved doubts.

One of the innovations at APFF, and the reason for it being called "popular", is that the winning films are screened at masjids, schools, universities, auditoriums, public parks, theaters and other places across the country.

The first festival, thought to be a one-off initiative, was held on the first anniversary of the Eighty-Eight Intrigue. Just twenty works were screened simultaneously at 30 points around the country. The following year, organisers called for films on specific topics (the history of the Islamic Revolution, the soft war, the December 30 rally, and the Islamic Awakening). 320 works were submitted by artists and filmmakers, which were screened at 300 points across the country. This grew to 900 works in the third festival.

== 2013 International Festival ==
In 2013, the fourth festival was opened up to international entries. 1700 domestic and 500 international works participated, with simultaneous screenings covering all provinces of the country throughout the year.

Special Awards: Christian Zionism: The Tragedy and the Turning (USA); The Stones Cry Out (Italy). Golden Lanterns: Plunder: The Crime of our Time (USA); A Path to Gaza Prison Camp (UK); The Unclear Truth (UK). Tablets of Honor: Valentino's Ghost (USA); The Money Lobby (Iran), Between Anvil and Hammer (Iran).

== 2014 International Festival ==
The fifth festival had screenings at hundreds of national points throughout the year. 1700 domestic and 500 international works participated in the festival. The simultaneous screenings covered all provinces of the country and increased to more than 2500 points.

Golden Lantern: America's Surveillance State (USA) Tablets of Honor: The Writer with No Hands (UK); These Walls Will Talk (Iran)

== 2024 International Festival ==
The 14th Ammar International Popular Film Festival was held from January 11 to 19, 2024, with a focus on the "New World Order."

4018 works participated in the festival. The secretary for this edition of the festival was Mr. Suhail Asaad.

In this period of the festival, cinema and television director Mohammad Hossein Latifi was honored with a plaque and Ammar lantern.

== 2025 International Festival ==
The 15th Festival will be held from January, 2025.

The secretary for this edition of the festival is Marzieh Hashemi.

== See also ==
- Tehran Times
- Nader Talebzadeh
- Asghar Abbasi
- Sobh International Media Festival
