= Generation M =

Generation M may refer to:

- Generation M (comics), a five-issue X-Men comics spinoff
- Generation M: Misogyny in Media & Culture, a 2008 documentary film by Thomas Keith
- Generation M: Young Muslims Changing the World, a 2016 book by Shelina Zahra Janmohamed

== See also ==
- Generation Z, the demographic cohort succeeding Millennials and preceding Generation Alpha
