= Setin =

SETiN
- Directed by: Asghar Abbasi
- Written by: Raheleh Shadmehri; Asghar Abbasi
- Produced by: Abbas Akbari
- Starring: Siamak Atlasi; Sima Khezrabadi; Ramin Maraghi; Alireza Savehdoroudi
- Distributed by: MAFiLM
- Release date: 25 December 2019
- Running time: 11 minutes 15 seconds
- Country: Iran
- Language: Persian
- Budget: 1,500 USD

SETiN is an Iranian short film with a social theme, directed, produced and co-written by Asghar Abbasi, and starring Siamak Atlasi. The film deals with the social issues of Iranian culture. Setin was nominated for the best film at the HECare Film Festival in Canada.

== Awards and nominations ==
- Nominated for the "fiction films" special section of the Tehran International Short Film Festival
- Nominated for the Best Film of the HECare Film Festival in Canada
