= Anna Eriksson =

Finnish artist, filmmaker, composer, singer

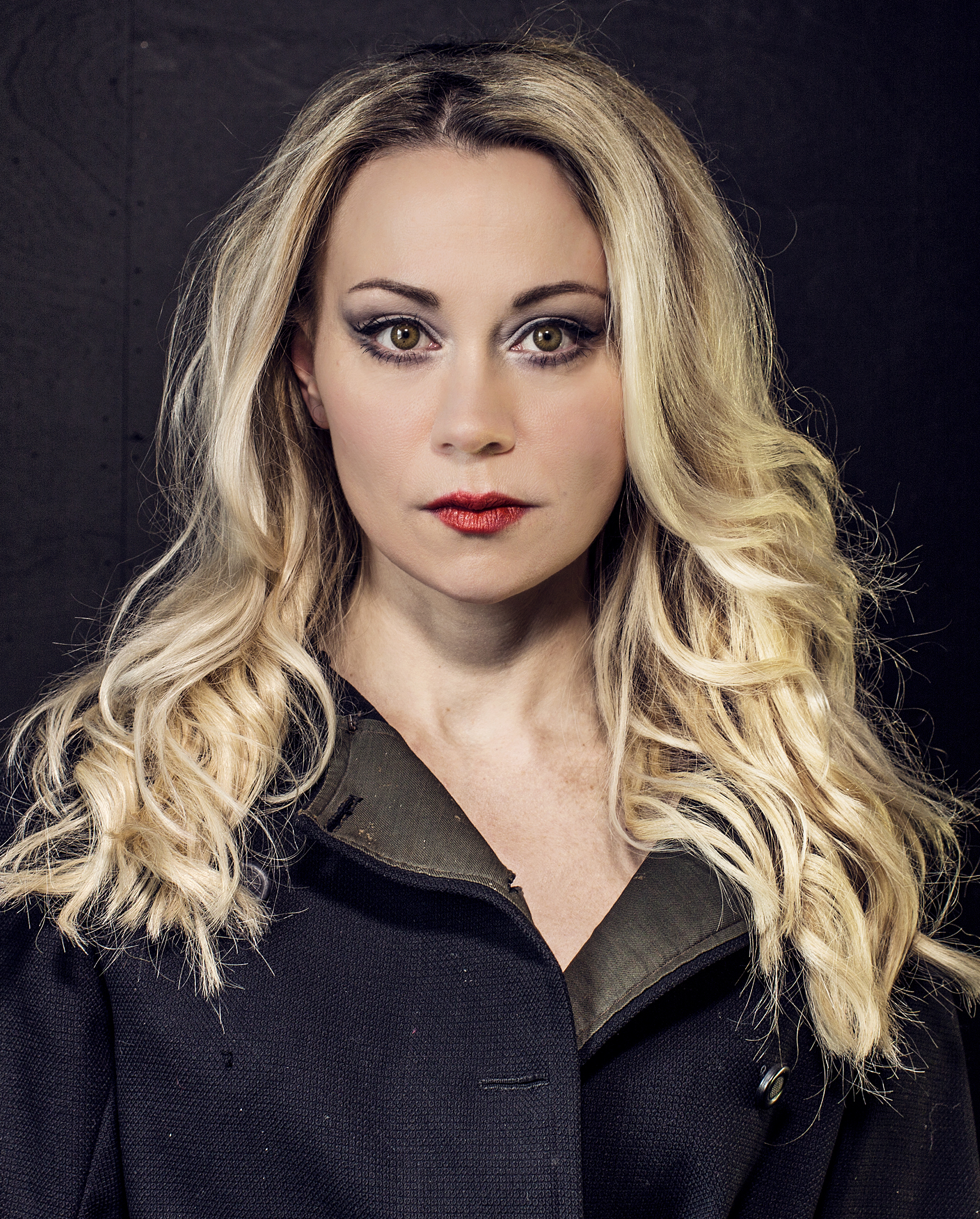

Background information
- Born: Anna Sofia Eriksson; 22 April 1977 (age 49); Ihode (Pyhäranta), Finland
- Genres: Pop, rock, art pop, experimental, film score
- Occupations: Artist, filmmaker, composer, singer
- Instruments: clarinet, piano
- Years active: 1995 – present
- Website: www.annaeriksson.fi

Anna Sofia Eriksson (born 22 April 1977) is a Finnish artist, filmmaker, composer, and singer. In September 2018, avantgarde film M directed and produced by Eriksson was having the world premiere at the Venice International Film Critics Week, 75th Venice International Film Festival. In 2022, her second feature film W premiered at the Locarno Film Festival. Eriksson is one of the most successful singers in Finnish chart history.

== Career ==
=== Kiitorata and three albums (1995–1999) ===
Anna Eriksson came to public attention after participating in the Kiitorata song competition on MTV3 in 1995. Her debut album Anna Eriksson was released in 1997. More than 81,000 copies have been sold, or double platinum. The album produced successful singles Juliet ja Joonatan and Kesä yhdessä. With her debut album, Eriksson was awarded with the Emma award as the Newcomer of the Year.

In 1998 for Christmas Eriksson released the Christmas album Anna Joulu, which did not place on album charts but gradually ended up selling gold. The following year, the third album, Odota mua was released, featuring the hit song Ilta yöhön kuljettaa.

=== Eurovision qualification and two successful albums (2000–2004) ===
In 2000, Eriksson participated in the qualification for the Eurovision Song Contest with the song Oot voimani mun written by Petri Laaksonen. She finished second in the final, losing to the winner by three points. However, the song later won the first Finnish song in the OGAE Second Chance Contest where the best of the qualifiers from Eurovision songs is selected.

In 2001, Eriksson's Kun katsoit minuun was voted the best iskelmä of the year in a public vote organized by Iskelmä Radio. After selling over 57,000 songs, Kun katsoit minuun, Eriksson was again presented with the Emma Award as the Female Artist of the Year.

Released in November 2003, the Kaikista kasvoista album sold platinum and the title song became one of Eriksson's most famous hits.

=== From Sinusta sinuun and Ihode (2005–2009) ===
In the fall of 2005, Eriksson gave a concert tour of 16 locations in honor of the tenth anniversary of the artist, with the release of the album Sinusta sinuun. More than 50,000 copies of the album were sold and again included hit songs, including Ei se mennyt niin. Most of the songs in the Sinusta sinuun album were written by Eriksson and Sipe Santapukki.

In the autumn of 2007, Eriksson released her seventh album, named after the artist's domicile, Ihode.

=== New style and film career (2010–) ===
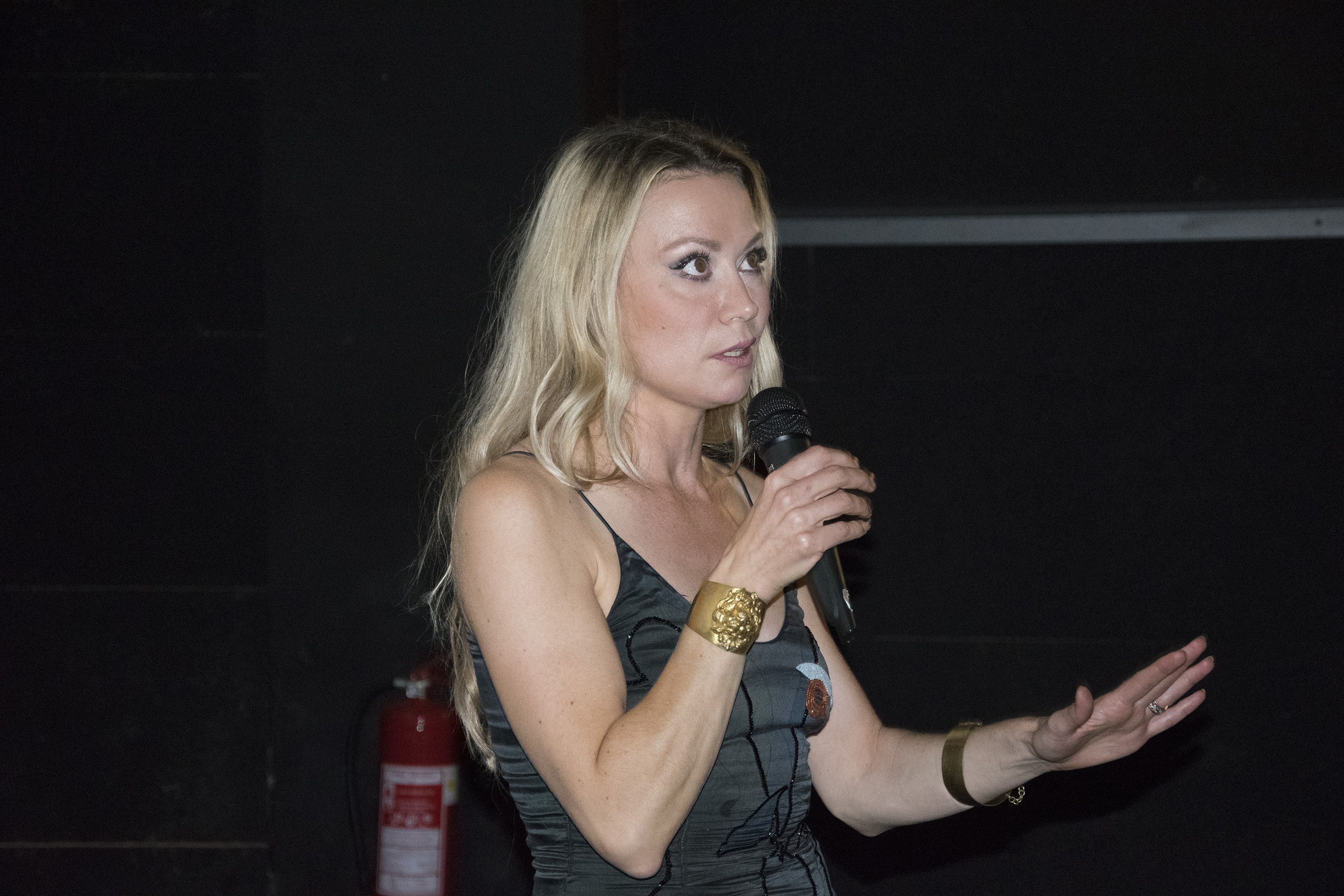
Eriksson presenting her film M in Prague

Eriksson's eighth and first English language studio album Garden of Love was released on 25 February 2010. The album was completely different in style from the artist's previous releases. The new album presented a shift to a more personal and dramatic expression for the former performer of pop-iskelmä music. All of the songs on the Garden of Love album are composed and written by Eriksson herself.

In 2012 Eriksson released her latest studio album, Mana, which she composed, wrote and produced herself. In 2013, Eriksson was awarded the Teosto Prize (one of the biggest art prizes in the Nordic countries). The Mana album was a "bold break" from Eriksson's previous productions. Mana broke the gold barrier in 2012 with 14,000 copies sold.

She also began work as a columnist for Turun Sanomat in 2012.

In September 2018, avantgarde film M directed and produced by Eriksson was having the world premiere at the Venice International Film Critics Week, 75th Venice International Film Festival. Only one Finnish film has been selected for this section previously. Eriksson plays the lead role in the film and wrote the script, music, did sound design and editing herself.

In 2019 the film received the Grand Prix and Best Feature Film awards at the Prague Independent Film Festival. The same year at Vienna Independent Film Festival, the film received the Best Feature Film and Best Cinematography awards.

Eriksson received the Best director Tarkovsky Award 2019 at The Blow-up Arthouse Film Festival in Chicago.

As a Nordic woman and an artist I feel obliged to give a voice to those aspects of femininity that are taboos, that are controversial, that are mystified and beaten down because of their sheer power. Still, to be truly political one must be personal and that's exactly what M turned out to be; a deeply personal work. Somewhere along the way it came upon me that the link between sexuality and death, that to me so profoundly defines Monroe's fate, is a link that we all share with her. That the ancient bond between these two forces is in fact an integral part of humanity. And that the myth that is Marilyn, holds in itself a reflection of our own dreams, our desires and our losses.

— Anna Eriksson Prague August 2019

Eriksson's M - The Rituals of a Lonely B...H Art Exhibition was held in 2020 in Rauma Art Museum.

Through filmmaking I am able to create a counterforce to the incomprehensibility of the world.

— Anna Eriksson

Eriksson has no plans to release new music in the near future. However, she intends to continue performing as a singer. She next plans to film in the United States.

In October 2018, Eriksson released a song "Gaia's Child" in collaboration with Stam1na.

In March 2021 it has been confirmed that Eriksson has received government funding from Finland for her new feature film titled W. In August 2022, political art film W film directed and written by Eriksson had the world premiere at the Locarno Film Festival. The film won the Best Feature Film and Best Film Score awards at the Vienna Independent Film Festival.

The film W received the Best Director, Best Actress (Anna Eriksson) and Best Art Direction awards at the 2023 Prague Independent Film Festival.

In 2022 Anna Eriksson won the Espoo Ciné Film Award for her achievements in cinema.

She received the grant by Kone Foundation for her new film E.

== Personal life ==
During childhood, Eriksson lived in India, Saudi Arabia and Tanzania because of her father's work as an engineer. She was a keen singer and performer since childhood. Abroad she has performed at many children's parties, embassy parties, churches and school parties. She enjoys painting.

Eriksson got married on 9 August 2008 to photographer and cinematographer Matti Pyykkö. She gave birth to her son in May 2013 and the family lives in Uusikaupunki.

== Discography ==
=== Albums ===
Year	Album	Charts	Certification
Year	Album	FIN	Certification
1997	Anna Eriksson	15	
1998	Anna joulu	-	
1999	Odota mua	6	
2001	Kun katsoit minuun	3	
2003	Kaikista Kasvoista	7	
2005	Sinusta sinuun	4	
2007	Ihode	7	
2010	Garden of Love	3	
2012	Mana	2	
2015	Gloria	19	

Compilation albums

Year	Album	Charts	Certification
Year	Album	FIN	Certification
2003	Parhaat – Seurataan johtajaa	6	
2008	Annan vuodet	16	

=== Singles ===
Year	Single	Charts	Certification	Album
Year	Single	FIN	Certification	Album
1998	"Kesä yhdessä"	7		
2001	"Kun katsoit minuun"	14		
2012	"Jos mulla olisi sydän"	5		

Featured in

Year	Single	Charts	Certification	Album
Year	Single	FIN	Certification	Album
2010	"You Get Me" (Seal feat. Anna Eriksson)	17		

== Filmography ==
- M (2018)
- W (2022)
- E (2025)

== See also ==
- List of best-selling music artists in Finland
