= Derrick Lui =

Singaporean film director

- Born: 19 September 1976 (age 50); Singapore
- Other name: 雷坚钦
- Education: Murdoch University, Anglo-Chinese School (ACS)
- Occupations: Film director, producer, screenwriter
- Years active: 2000s–present
- Notable work: 1400 (2015), Samui Women (2010), Rose (2020), Colours (2007), When Night Fa11s (2009), Oversteer (2024)

Derrick Lui (Chinese: 雷坚钦; pinyin: Léi jiānqīn; born 19 September 1976) is a Singaporean film director, producer, and screenwriter. After an initial stint at Mediacorp's TVC arm, he moved to MTV Asia, where he produced and directed broadcast promos and artist image spots. He transitioned into independent film and documentary work. His early shorts, Colours and When Night Fa11s, screened internationally, with the latter receiving a Special Mention at the I've Seen Films International Film Festival in Milan. Lui made his feature debut with 1400 (2015), which premiered at the Montreal World Film Festival, and later wrote, produced, and directed Oversteer (2024), described in Singaporean media as the country's first race car film.

== Early life and education ==
Lui was born and raised in Singapore. He was initially a footballer, but a career-ending ankle injury during a Tampines Rovers game led him to shift his focus toward filmmaking. He studied business and finance before working in the corporate sector, later pursuing film studies and graduating in 1998. Much of his craft in cinematography, editing, and directing was developed independently through short films, music videos, and documentaries.

== Career ==
=== Early career ===
After graduating from Murdoch University, Lui began at Mediacorp's Caldecott Productions International as a production assistant, gaining experience in commercials, corporate videos, and production roles. In the early 2000s, he joined MTV Asia as a director, producing image spots and promos for international and regional artists including U2, Ricky Martin, Stefanie Sun, and Aaron Kwok.

In 2005, he founded his own production company, Vogue Films, which allowed him to branch into short films and documentaries. His personal interest in cars and motorsport culture later influenced the themes of his feature film Oversteer.

In 2016, Lui served as a juror at the Reel Sydney Festival of World Cinema. He was selected for Korea's NAFF Fantastic Film School in Bucheon in 2021 and later invited to preside over the Short Film Jury at the Life Beyond Life Film Festival in Turin, Italy, in 2023 and 2024. In 2024, he was selected to participate in Platform Busan at the Busan International Film Festival and won the Best Director award at the 2025 Vienna Independent Film Festival.

=== Documentaries ===
One of Lui's early non-fiction works was Samui Women (2010), a documentary about Chinese migrant women who came to Singapore in the 1930s to work as manual labourers. Known locally as "Samsui women," they often faced difficult working and living conditions, with many remaining in Singapore permanently. The film features the personal accounts of two such women. Samui Women was screened at several international festivals, including in competition at the Raindance Film Festival in London, the Asiaticafilmmediale in Rome, and as a finalist at the Shanghai Film Festival.

=== Short films ===
Lui has directed numerous shorts, including Colours (2007), When Night Fa11s (2009), and Rose (2020).

Colours (2007) tells the story of a colour-blind girl who discovers a pair of magical glasses that allow her to see colours in heightened intensity. Struggling with the overwhelming vision, she breaks one of the lenses and ultimately finds a balance between her condition and her desire to experience colour. Colours was screened at over 40 international festivals and received awards in Asia and Australia.

When Night Fa11s (2009) centers on Eternity and Wei Wei, two individuals in love whose contrasting lifestyles and personalities put a strain on their relationship. As the differences grow, the couple is confronted with the reality that separation may be unavoidable. This short earned a Special Mention at the I’ve Seen Films International Film Festival in Milan, it was the only Asian film recognized at the event.

Rose (2020) is a family drama about a 75-year-old widow coping with dementia and loneliness until an unexpected visit from her family briefly alleviates her isolation. The film was produced as part of the STOREYS campaign supported by the Lien Foundation. It was selected for the World Short Film Competition at the International Film Festival & Awards Macao and won the statuette for Best Short Film at the seventh edition of the Fausto Rossano Award in Italy.

=== Feature films ===
Lui's first feature film, 1400 (2015), premiered in the “Focus on World Cinema” section at the Montreal World Film Festival. The romantic drama, set in a hotel room over several days, was screened at international festivals and won Best Feature Film at Cinewest flEXiff in 2015 and Best Picture at the Maverick Movie Awards in 2016. Lui was also nominated for Best Director at the Maverick Movie Awards. The film was later distributed by Netflix in Southeast Asia.

His second feature, Oversteer, was released in Singapore on 31 January 2024. Lui directed, produced, and wrote the film, which has been described as Singapore's first racing-themed feature. Developed over a period of more than a decade, the production faced delays and funding challenges before its completion. The film later screened at multiple international festivals and won awards, including Best Action Comedy at the Urban Action Showcase in New York.

=== Music videos ===
Lui has also directed music videos for regional artists. His video Rented Happiness (《租来的幸福》) by Tao Ran won Best Music Video at the GIAA Festival of Short Films and Videos in New York.

In recent years, Lui collaborated with Cantonese singer Jason Chung on two music videos. Their first project, 《塞翁失馬》, was a self-financed production that allowed them complete creative control. They later worked together on 《瀰漫霧雨》, released in July, with music composed by Frank Chen and co-produced by Chen and Chung.

== Style and themes ==
Lui describes himself as an “accidental filmmaker,” initially more passionate about music than film. He favors a collaborative and improvisational approach, often developing dialogue and character with actors during the production process. His films frequently explore themes of personal struggle, resilience, and family relationships, typically produced on modest budgets, emphasizing authenticity.

== Filmography ==
=== Feature films ===
- 1400 (2015) – Director, Producer, Writer
- Oversteer (2024) – Director, Producer, Writer

=== Short films (selected) ===
- Colours (2007)
- When Night Fa11s (2009)
- Peter (2009)
- Samsui Women (2010)
- Fade In (2011)
- Father (2012)
- Ah Po (2012)
- Rose (2020)

=== Documentary ===
- Samsui Women (2010)

== Awards and nominations ==
Colours (2007):

- Awards at festivals in Asia and Australia

When Night Falls (2009):

- Special Mention – I've Seen Films International Film Festival, Milan

1400 (2015):

- Best Feature Film – Cinewest flEXiff
- Best Picture – Maverick Movie Awards (Los Angeles, 2016)
- Best Director nomination – Maverick Movie Awards

Oversteer (2024):

- NAFF SBA Award – BIFAN NAFF Project Market (2022)
- Best Action Comedy – Urban Action Showcase (New York, 2024)
- Nominations at International Motor Film Awards (London, 2024)
- Official Selection at the Blue Chair Film Festival, Luang Prabang, Laos (2024)
- Official selections at Oltre lo Specchio, Blue Chair, and Hokkaido Film Festivals
- Additional honors at the Vienna Independent Film Festival, RED Movie Awards (France), and Bangkok Movie Awards (2025)
- Opening Film, Official Selection, Best Feature Film at the Dili International Film Festival, Timor-Leste (2025)
- Best Feature Film, Best Director at the Vienna Independent Film Festival (2025)
