= Matthew Alford =

British author

Matthew Alford is a British academic known for his work on the relationship between Western governments, war, and the media.

== Career ==
=== Academia ===
In 2008, Alford earned a doctorate from the University of Bath. He adapted his thesis to write Reel Power: Hollywood Cinema and American Supremacy, published in 2010 by Pluto Press.

=== Journalism ===
In 2008, Alford co-authored articles about the disappearance of screenwriter Gary Devore for The Guardian and Fortean Times, later producing a documentary The Writer with No Hands on the topic.

In 2017, Alford co-authored National Security Cinema: The Shocking New Evidence of Government Control in Hollywood, drawing on FOIA requests to the CIA and Department of Defense. The book formed the basis for Theaters of War, a documentary he co-produced in 2022.

=== Political Activity ===
In 2024, Alford criticised the US and UK for “sleepwalking into a third world war”. He was the Workers Party of Britain's parliamentary candidate in Bath the UK 2024 general election. He received 230 votes (0.48%), finishing seventh of nine candidates and losing his deposit.

== Selected works ==
=== Books ===
- Reel Power: Hollywood Cinema and American Supremacy. London: Pluto Press, 2010. ISBN 9780745329826.
  - 2018. French edition with new introduction by the author. Hollywood Propaganda, Cinéma Hollywoodien et Hégémonie Américaine (Éditions Critiques). Translation: Cyrille Rivallan. ISBN 979-1097331092
  - 2023. Final Cut (Éditions Critiques). French edition with new preface by the author. ISBN 979-10-97331-46-7
- National Security Cinema: The Shocking New Evidence of Government Control in Hollywood (CreateSpace, 2017). With Tom Secker. ISBN ISBN 9781548084981.
  - 2021. Expanded French edition. L'Empire Vous Divertit: Comment la CIA et le Pentagone Utilisent Hollywood (Investig'Action). Translation: Philippe Stroot. ISBN 978-2930827773

=== Films ===
- Theaters of War (2022) (co-producer)
- The Writer With No Hands (2014) (producer)
