= Siamak Atlasi =

Iranian actor (1936–2021)

- سیامک اطلسی
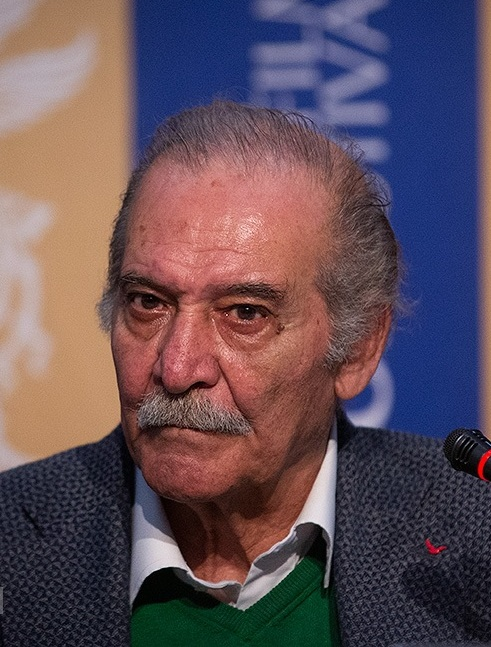
- Born: Ezzat Atlasifar; 24 June 1936; Urmia, Iran
- Died: 26 September 2021 (aged 85); Tehran, Iran
- Occupations: Actor, film director

Ezzat Atlasifar (Persian: عزت اطلسی‌فر; 24 June 1936 – 26 September 2021), known professionally as Siamak Atlasi (Persian: سیامک اطلسی), was an Iranian actor and voice actor.

== Biography ==
Atlasi started his artistic career in 1964 through the Association of Speakers and made his film acting debut in 1971 in the movie Rough Men, directed by Saber Rahbar.

=== Death ===
Despite being vaccinated, Atlasi died of COVID-19 on 26 September 2021.

== Selected filmography ==
- Ballad of Tara (1979)
- All That Is (2018)
- A Man Without a Shadow (2019)
- SETiN (2019)
