= 1400 (film) =

2015 Singaporean film

- Theatrical release poster
- Directed by: Derrick Lui
- Screenplay by: Terence Ang; Derrick Lui
- Story by: Derrick Lui
- Produced by: Derrick Lui
- Starring: Desmond Tan; Ya Hui; Vincent Tee; Alan Tan; Angeline Yap; Will Lawandi; Maria Alexandria; Grace Lee-Khoo
- Cinematography: Chua Lian Seng
- Edited by: Alfie Law
- Music by: Bang Wenfu
- Production company: Vogue Films
- Release dates: 6 September 2015 (Montreal World Film Festival); 26 August 2016 (Singapore)
- Running time: 89 minutes
- Country: Singapore
- Languages: Mandarin; English

1400 is a 2015 Singaporean drama film directed by Derrick Lui, in his directorial debut. Set in Singapore's red light district, with four interwoven stories, the film revolves around four couples in search of love and belonging in a hotel. The film stars Desmond Tan, Ya Hui, Vincent Tee, Alan Tan, Angeline Yap, Will Lawandi, Maria Alexandria and Grace Lee-Khoo.

== Plot ==
The film is composed of four interlocking narratives, each exploring different facets of love and belonging. The stories include:

- Rain and Summer: Rain (Desmond Tan), a deaf man, and Summer (Ya Hui), who is blind, attempt to connect and communicate despite their sensory challenges.
- Paul and Janice: An adulterous relationship between Paul (Will Lawandi) and Janice (Maria Alexandria), exploring themes of guilt, intimacy, and betrayal.
- An older man’s grief: Vincent Tee plays a middle-aged man who goes on dates as a way to cope with the loss of his wife, still haunted by memories.
- Moon’s struggle: A poor foreign woman, Moon (Angeline Yap), balances work, survival, and searching for a meaningful relationship.

These stories are connected through their setting largely centred on a hotel named “1400” as characters’ paths cross, often invisibly, under the roofs, corridors, and rooms.

== Cast ==
- Desmond Tan as Rain
- Ya Hui as Summer
- Vincent Tee as James
- Will Lawandi as Paul
- Maria Alexandria as Janice
- Alan Tan as Alan
- Angeline Yap as Moon
- Luis Lim as Uncle Huat
- Grace Lee-Khoo as Lulu
- Junichi Takahashi as Takeshi

== Production ==
Filming was completed in just five days.

== Awards and nominations ==
Awards	Category	Recipient	Result	Ref.
2015 Cinewest flEXiff	Best Feature Film	1400	Won	
2016 Maverick Movie Awards	Best Picture: Feature	1400	Won	
2016 Maverick Movie Awards	Best Director: Feature	Derrick Lui	Nominated	
2016 Maverick Movie Awards	Best Cinematography: Feature	Chua Lian Seng	Nominated	
2016 Maverick Movie Awards	Best Music: Feature	Bang Wenfu	Nominated	
2016 Maverick Movie Awards	Best Actor: Feature	Desmond Tan	Nominated	
2016 Maverick Movie Awards	Best Actress: Feature	Ya Hui	Nominated	
2016 Maverick Movie Awards	Best Supporting Actor: Feature	Vincent Tee	Nominated	
2016 Maverick Movie Awards	Best Ensemble Acting: Feature	1400	Nominated	
