= Vienna Independent Film Festival =

Film festival in Vienna, Austria

VIFF Vienna Independent Film Festival
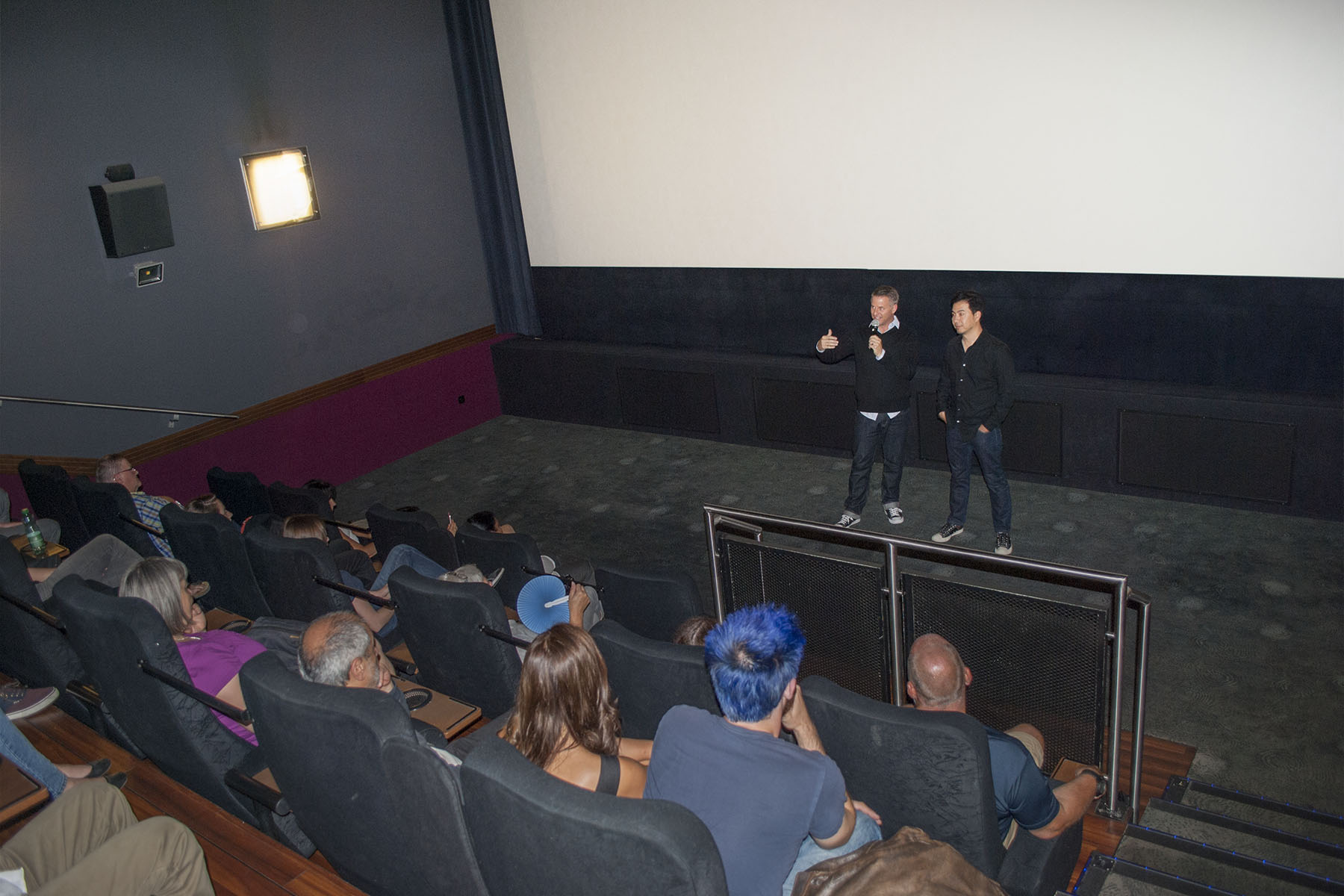
- Location: Vienna, Austria
- Website: www.vienna-film-festival.com

VIFF Vienna Independent Film Festival is an international film festival held annually in July in Vienna, capital of Austria. The festival focuses on independent cinema.

== History ==
The Vienna Independent Film Festival was held for the first time on 4–7 July 2016 in the cinemas UCI Kinowelt Millenium City and CineCenter. The festival program consisted of 38 films from 14 countries in international competition. Opening film of the festival was God of Happiness by Dito Tsintsadze who won the Best Director award. Grand Prix of the festival – The Golden Sphinx – was awarded to the Konkani film Let's dance to the rhythm directed by Bardroy Barretto. Graham Streeter received the Best Feature Film award for his film Imperfect Sky. The award for Best Documentary Film was awarded to Violins of Hope: Strings of the Holocaust narrated by Adrien Brody and directed by Lance Shultz.

== Winners ==
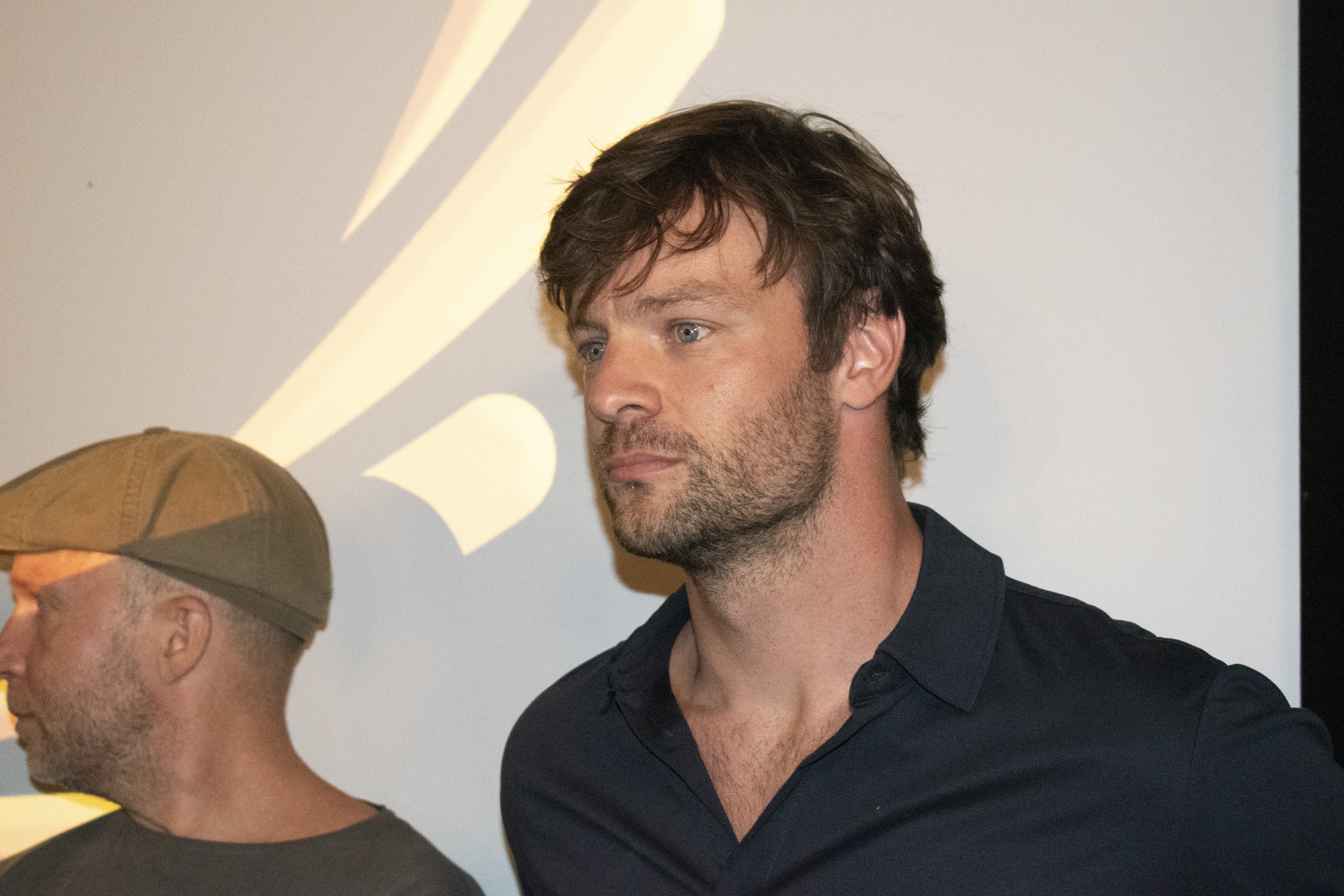
2023 Best Actor award winner Wolfgang Cerny at the festival

=== 2025 ===
- Best Feature Film

Oversteer — Directed by Derrick Lui

- Best Director

Derrick Lui (Oversteer)

- Best Actor

Steve Kuzmick (Viaticum, directed by Derek Frey)

- Best Actress

Kristin Mounts (Lanternfly)

- Best Short Film

Waves — Directed by Hans Glassman

- Best Short Film Director

Salvador Carrasco (What Next)

- Best Art Direction

Conrad Whitaker (Whiskey Rose)

- Best Music Video

Redemption — Directed by Ciril Tscheligi

- Best Cinematography

Trevor Murphy (The Listeners)

- Best Experimental Film

The Computational Realm — Directed by Dian Wang

- Best Unproduced Screenplay

Come Monday — Written by Graham Streeter

- Best Song

Moon Over Capri — Song by Ava Della Pietra

- Best Documentary

Noah's Ark - A Coral Rescue First — Directed by Michael Zimmer

- Best Animation

Unstoppable Beat — Directed by Luke Dye-Montefiore

- Special Mention - Unproduced Screenplay

Big Kidding — Written by Milana Rudinskaia

=== 2024 ===
- Best Feature Film

Kintsugi — Directed by Diego Dicarlo

- Best Actor

Francois Arnaud (Canadian Sniper)

- Best Actress

Sofia Verna — Kintsugi

- Best Director - Short Film

Carlos Arjona (Far Away from My Town)

- Best Director - Feature Film

Michel Kandinsky (Canadian Sniper)

- Best Short Film

The Journey — Directed by Dan Istrate

- Best Art Direction

Kyle Browne, Stan Strickland, Ken Kinna (Spirit Sensing - Anima of the Quarry)

- Best Cinematography

Kintsugi — Cinematography by Diego Dicarlo

- Best Screenplay

He — Written by Chunzi Zhang

- Best Documentary Film

The Ocean — Directed by Jennifer Schlieper

- Best Animated Film

I'm Hip — Directed by John Musker

- Best Music Video

Won't Be Around — Directed by Terry Blade

- Best Song

ego — Song by Ava Della Pietra

- Best Experimental Film

HOME — Directed by Kazumi Shimizu

- Best Unproduced Script

PharmacyNice — Written by Joey Gu

=== 2023 ===
Grand Prix

- The Whirlpool — Directed by Denis Kryuchkov

Best Feature Film

- W — Directed by Anna Eriksson

Best Short Film Director

- Deirdre Lorenz — Return to New York

Best Feature Film

- Graham Streeter — Unfix

Best Original Screenplay

- 8-Ball — Original Screenplay by Adrien Marquet

Best Short Film

- Have a Nice Apocalypse — Directed by Dávid Géczy

Best Documentary Film

- My Two Lives — Directed by Sarita Gold

Best Experimental Film

- Little Planet 7406 — Directed by Goran Šporčić

Best Song

- Fearless — Music by J Edna Mae

Best Music Video

- Vampire — Directed by Persia White

Best Actor

- Wolfgang Cerny (The Whirlpool)

Best Art Direction

- An Occurrence — Directed by Dien Vo

Best Editing

- Touching Moon — Edited by Sophia Liu

Best Cinematography

- La Pietra — Cinematography by Michael Bradley

Best Film Score

- W — Film Score by Anna Eriksson

Best Unproduced Script

- Stay With Me — Written by Zsolt Pozsgai

=== 2022 ===
Grand Prix

- Playing Through – directed by Balbinka Korzeniowska

Best Feature Film

- Playing Through – directed by Balbinka Korzeniowska

Best Director

- Balbinka Korzeniowska – Playing Through

Best Short Film

- Živa (The Death of the Goddess Živa) – directed by Nataša Stearns

Best Music video

- Frozen Heart – directed by Nina Guseva

Best Documentary Film

- Ballymanus – directed by Patrick Sharkey, Séan Doupe

Best Experimental Film

- Blue Delusion – directed by Guan Fang

Best Musical Film

- Big Boss – directed by Keke Palmer

Best Comedy Film

- Hot Mess by Evelyne Tollman

Best Animated Film

- Me and My Winter Games-Perfect Holiday – directed by Haoling Lee, Ming Zhong, Zhe Zhang, Liwen Wang

Best Actress

- Julia Rae – Playing Through

Best Actor

- Brandon Sklenar – Futra Days

Best Supporting Actress

- Rosanna Arquette – Futra Days

Best Film Score

- Long Flat Balls “Broken Promises” – music by Zach Robinson

Best Song

- Molly’s Rainbow – by Katie Hardyman

Best Cinematography

- Other Side of the Mountain – directed by Markus Otz

Best Screenplay

- JIZO-Evangelist – written and directed by Tokoroten Nakamura

Best Art Direction

- The Violin and its Shadow – directed by Greg Babalas

Best Unproduced Script

- The Faerie Rings – written by Zina Brown

Honorary Mention for Social Impact

- Change of Course – directed by Andreas Ortner

=== 2020 ===
Grand Prix

- Grand Cancan — Directed by Mikhail Kosyrev-Nesterov

Best Feature Film

- Between Pain and Amen — Directed by Toma Enache

Best Director

- Great Poetry (Aleksandr Lungin)

Best Original Screenplay

- Laugh or Die — Original Screenplay by Heikki Kujanpää

Best Short Film

- To Her — Directed by Jacopo Ardolino

Best Documentary Film

- Armenia(s), Time for Artists — Directed by Anahit Dasseux Ter Mesropian and David Vital-Durand

Best Experimental Film

- Our Turn — Directed by Martiros Vartanov

Best Music Video

- Champagne Drag Queen — Directed by Anna Haslehner

Best Actor

- Martti Suosalo (Laugh or Die)

Best Supporting Actor

- Jon Voight (Roe v. Wade)

Best Cinematography

- Grand Cancan — Cinematography by Dmitriy Ulyukaev

=== 2019 ===
Grand Prix

- Doing Money — Directed by Lynsey Miller

Best Feature Film

- M — Directed by Anna Eriksson

Best Director

- Doing Money (Lynsey Miller)

Best Original Screenplay

- Murder on the Road to Kathmandu — Original Screenplay by Rupalee Verma

Best Short Film

- Dark like the Night. Karenina-2019 — Directed by Radda Novikova

Best Documentary Film

- Three Scenes of a Wedding — Directed by Jason Tovey

Best Experimental Film

- Fragmented Dreams — Directed by Tonatiuh Garcia

Best Music Video

- Theresa's Groove — Directed by Aleksey Igudesman

Best Actor

- Atul Kulkarni (Murder on the Road to Kathmandu)

Best Supporting Actor

- Konstantin Khabensky (Dark like the Night. Karenina-2019)

Best Art Direction

- The Lossen — Directed Colin Skevington

Best Cinematography

- M — Cinematography by Matti Pyykkö

Best Film Score

- Hinge — Film score by Diana Ringo

=== 2018 ===
Grand Prix

- I May Regret — Directed by Graham Streeter

Best Feature Film

- NO-ONE — Directed by Lev Prudkin, Vladimir Prudkin

Best Director

- I May Regret (Graham Streeter)

Best Original Screenplay

- Rosemarie — Original Screenplay by Adonis Floridis

Best Short Film

- Father of the Man — Directed by Tommy Creagh

Best Documentary Film

- Ballad of a Righteous Merchant — Directed by Herbert Golder

Best Experimental Film

- Ghosts on the Road to Camalt — Directed by Jason Tovey

Best Music Video

- The Sea — Directed by Hisanori Tsukuda

Best Actor

- Danny Glover (Buckout Road)

Best Cinematography

- NO-ONE — Cinematography by Ziv Berkovich, David Stragmeister

Special Jury Prize

- Krieg — Directed by Jeff Fry

=== 2017 ===
Grand Prix (The Golden Sphinx)

- Million Loves In Me — Directed by Sampson Yuen

Best Feature Film

- Platonov — Directed by Andreas Morell

Best Director

- Ebrahim Hatamikia (Bodyguard)

Best Original Screenplay

- Million Loves in Me — Original Screenplay by John Yiu, Tiong Wooi LIM, Jeremy Tan

Best Short Film

- Forgiveness — Directed by Rima Irani

Best Documentary Film

- Chasing Stars — Directed by Markus Eichenberger
- The Writer with No Hands — Directed by William Westaway

Best Experimental Film

- Je Suis Le Ténébreux — Directed by Rank Amateur, Christopher Chaplin

Best Music Video

- Nara - alt-J — Directed by Jasmin Selen Heinz

Best Actor

- John Yiu (Million Loves in Me)

Best Supporting Actor

- Babak Hamidian (Bodyguard)

Best Art Direction

- Bodyguard — Directed by Ebrahim Hatamikia

Best Cinematography

- Platonov — Cinematography by Felix Cramer

=== 2016 ===
Grand Prix (The Golden Sphinx)

- Let's dance to the rhythm

Best Feature Film

- Imperfect Sky — Directed by Graham Streeter

Best Director

- Dito Tsintsadze (God of Happiness)

Best Original Screenplay

- The Closer — Original Screenplay by Eli Hershko & Isaac Broyn

Best Short Film

- After Truth — Directed by Nicolas Ehret

Best Animated Film

- “Parade” de Satie — Directed by Kōji Yamamura

Best Documentary Film

- Violins of Hope: Strings of the Holocaust — Directed by Lance Shultz

Best Experimental Film

- The Calling — Directed by Chris Boyd

Best Music Film

- Let's dance to the rhythm — Directed by Bardroy Barretto

Best Music Video

- Tiësto / The Chainsmokers - Split — Directed by Joe Zohar

Best Actor

- Blake Lewis (Imperfect Sky)

Best Supporting Actor

- Robert Berlin (The Closer)

Best Art Direction

- After Truth — Directed by Nicolas Ehret
- Let's Dance to the Rhythm — Directed by Bardroy Barretto

Best Cinematography

- God of Happiness — Cinematography by Ralf M. Mendle
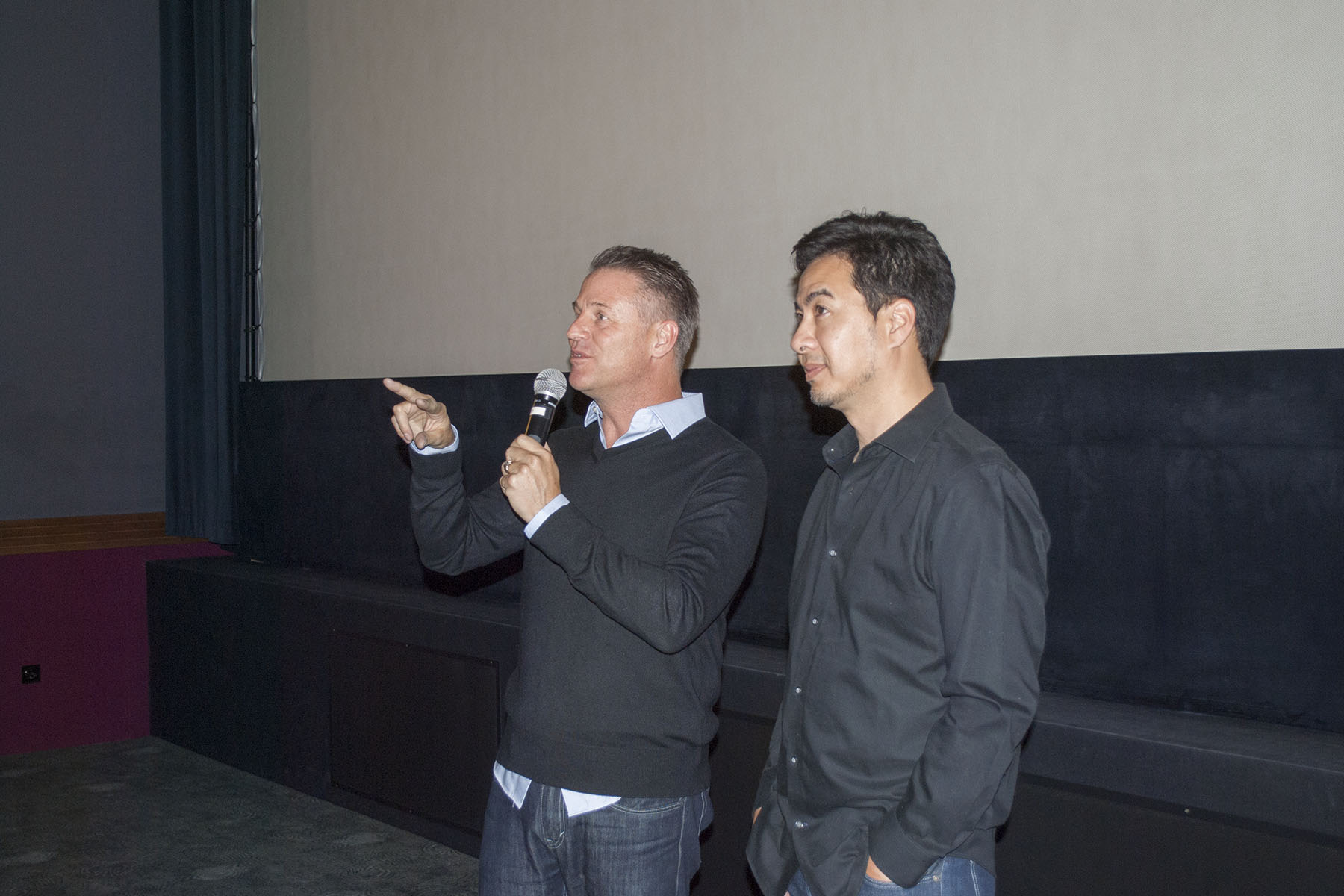
Director Graham Streeter and producer Alex Lebosq presenting their film "Imperfect Sky" at the VIFF 2016

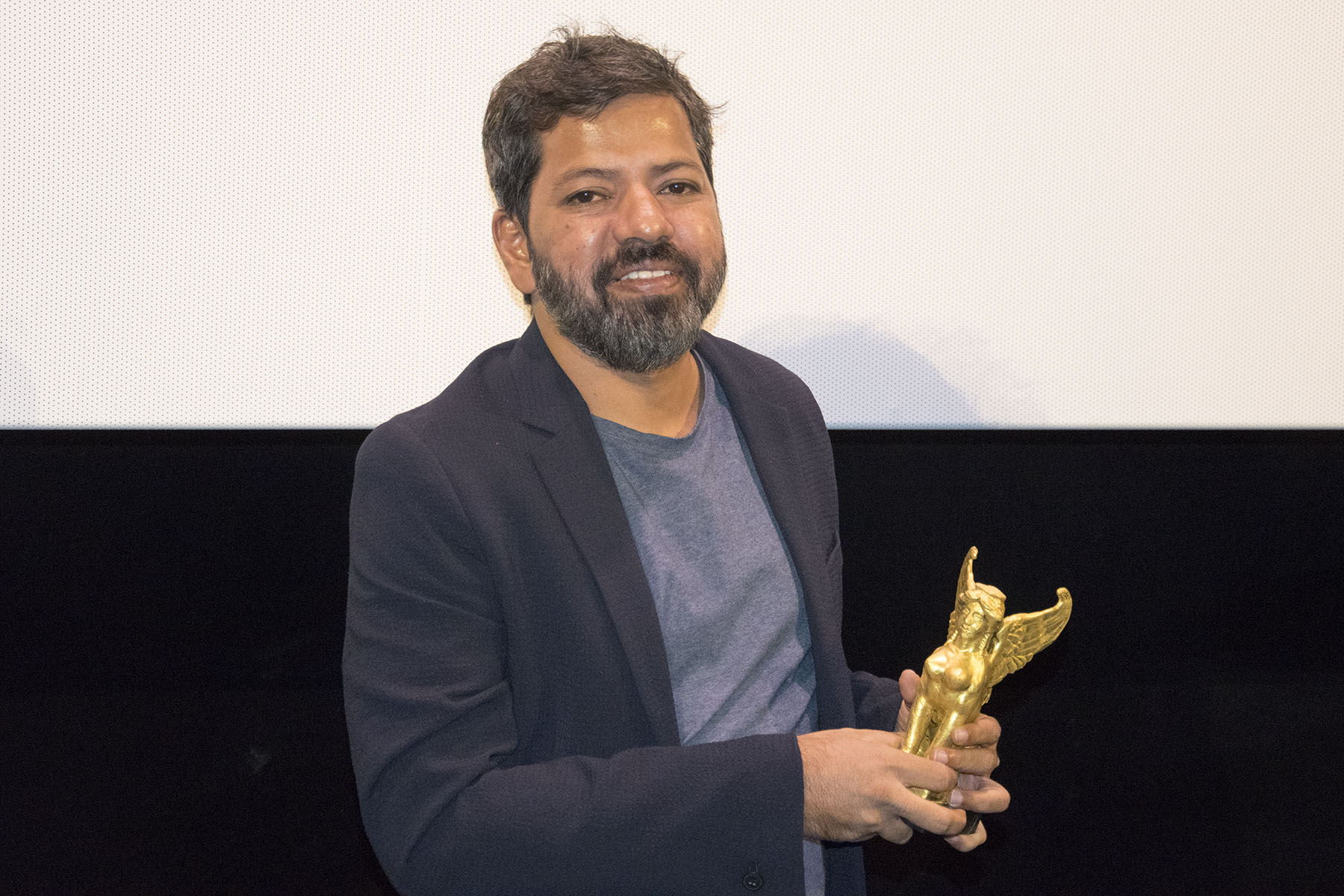
Director Bardroy Barretto receiving his Grand Prix for the film "Let's dance to the Rhythm" at the VIFF 2016

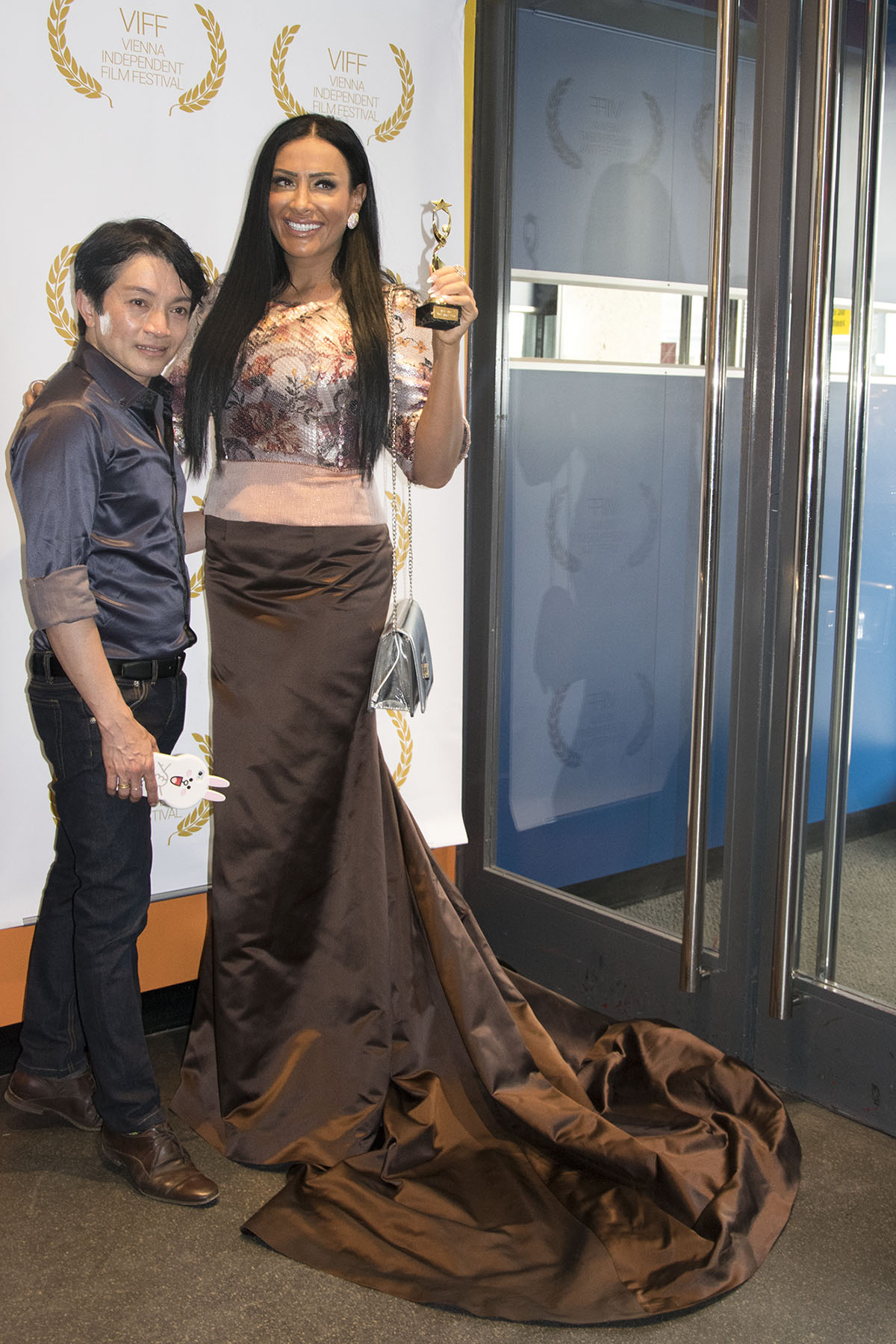
Fashion designer La Hong Nhut and director Rima Irani at the VIFF 2017

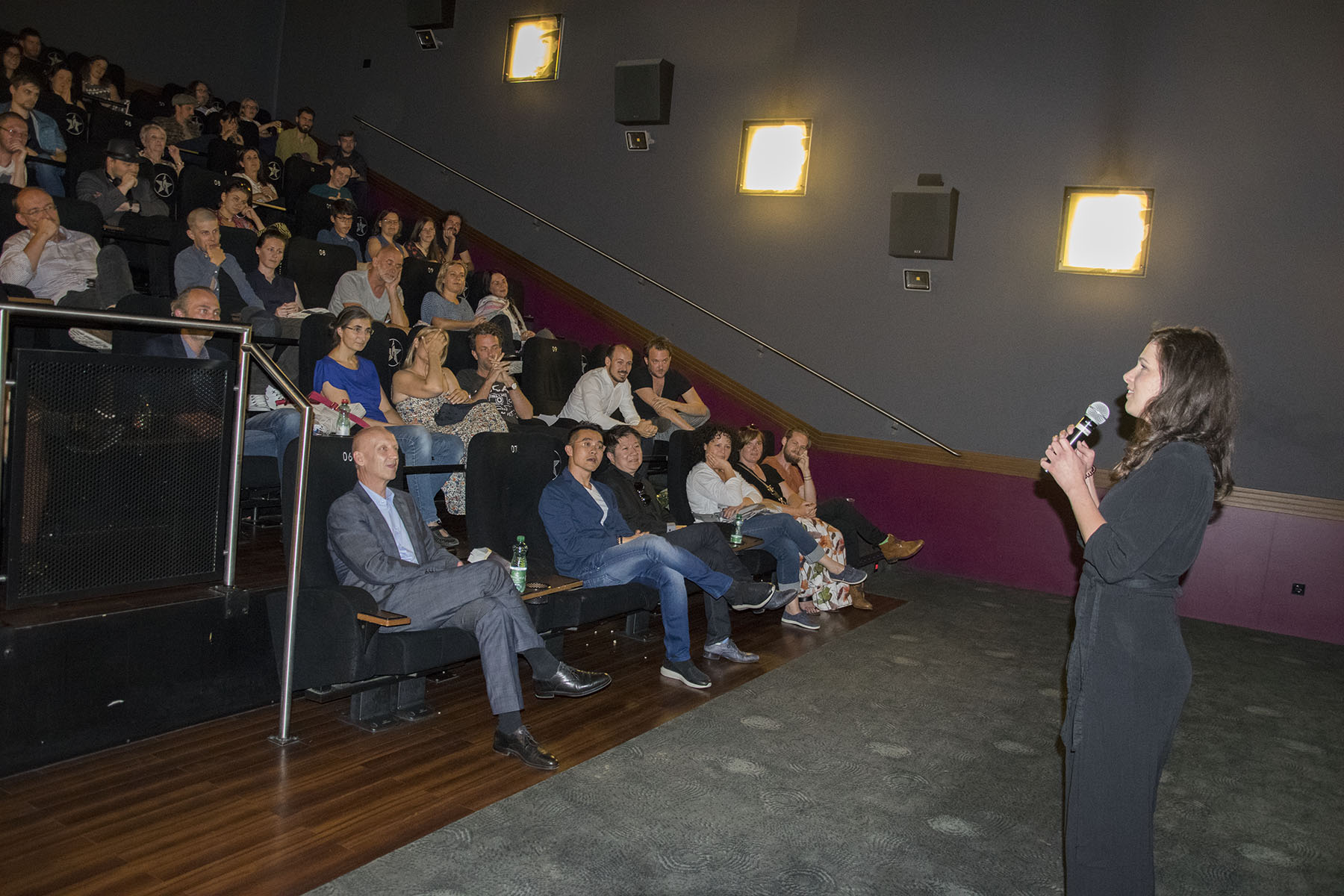
Director Sarah Scherer presenting her film "Golden Shot" at the VIFF 2017

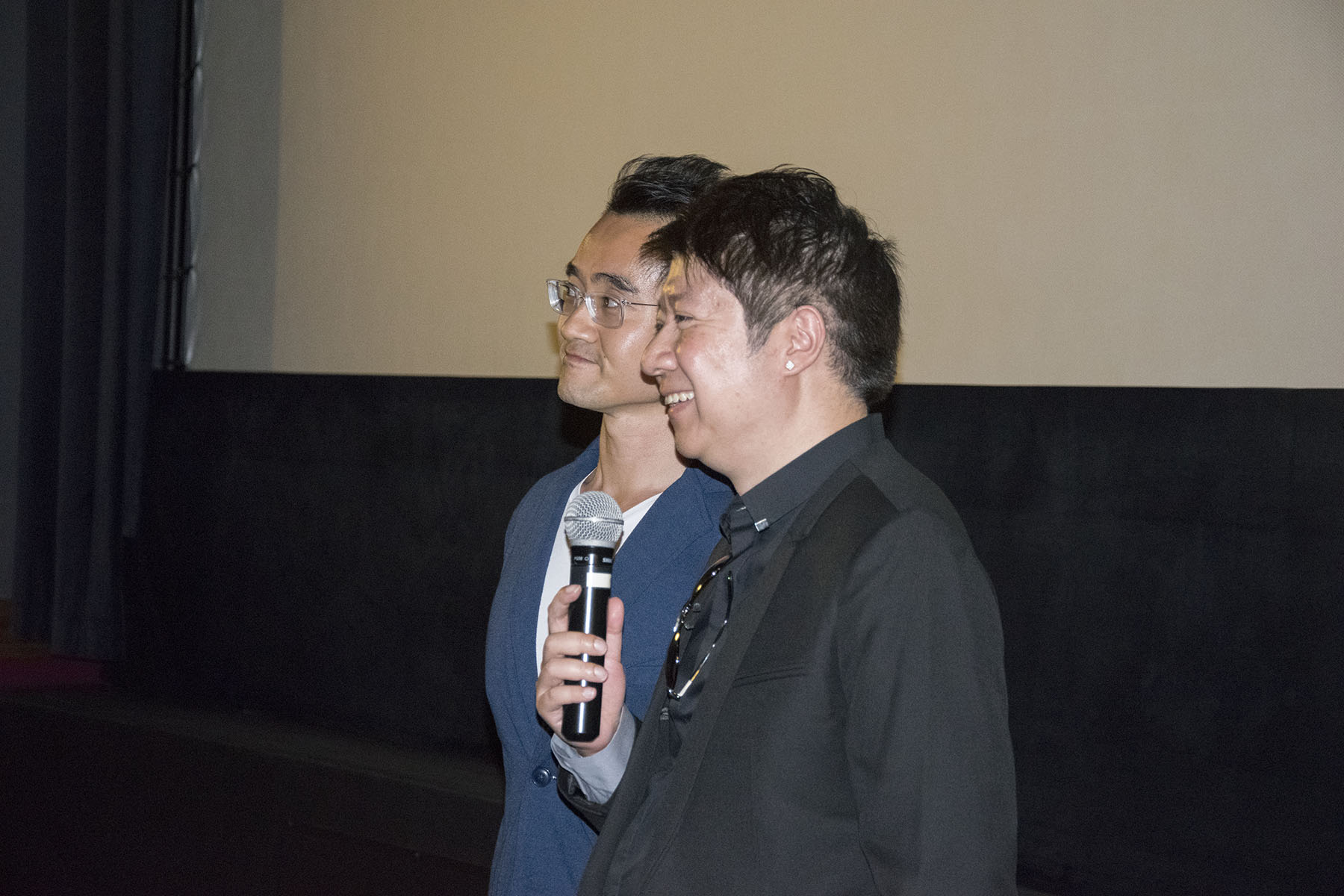
Actor John Yiu and producer Kenny Chan presenting their film "Million Loves in Me" at the VIFF 2017

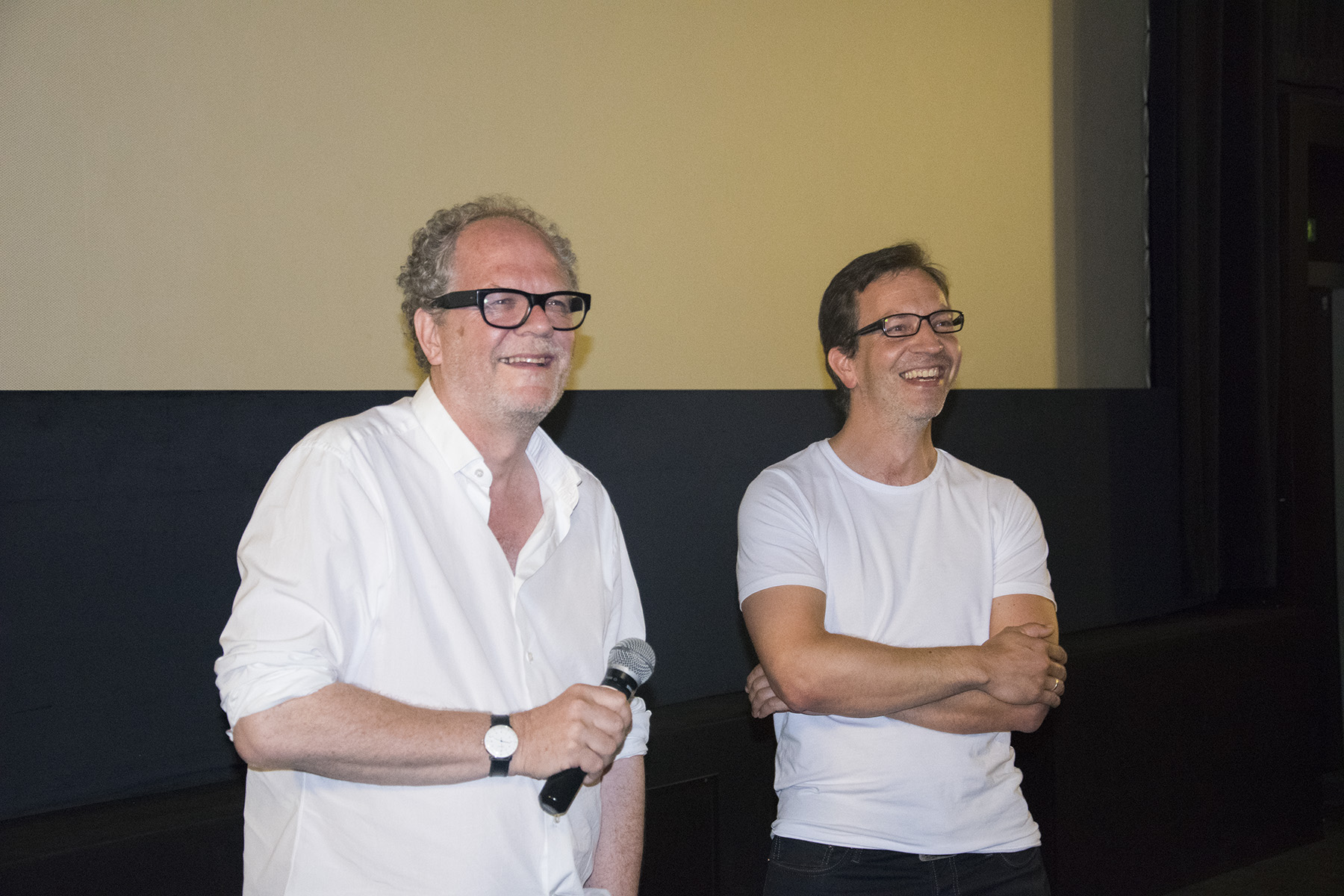
Director Andreas Morell and cinematographer Felix Cramer presenting their film "Platonov" at the VIFF 2017

== See also ==
- List of film festivals in Europe
