= Mohammad Rasouli =

Iranian author and Shahnameh scholar

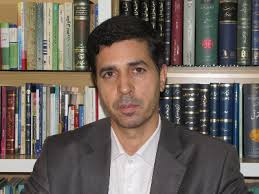
- Born: 29 October 1971 (age 54); Shahr-e Kord, Chaharmahal and Bakhtiari province, Iran
- Education: University of Tehran
- Occupations: Author; Shahnameh Scholar
- Writing career
- Years active: 2001–present
- Period: Literature, Research of Shahnameh, Economic sociology
- Genres: Fantasy; drama; young adult fiction; crime fiction

Mohammad Rasouli (Persian: محمد رسولی, born 29 October 1971 in Shahr-e Kord, Iran) is a writer, Shahnameh scholar and economist from Iran. Rasouli works as a Shahnameh scholar in Iran, Tajikistan and Afghanistan. Rasouli's last work named Nasukh was nominated for the "book and cinema" section of the Tehran International Short Film Festival. The script of the short film Nasukh is taken from the book Nasukh written by Mohammad Rasouli.

== Works ==
Rasouli has many works in the field of research and writing. His latest work is the book Nasukh, the story of this book has been turned into the screenplay of the short film Nasukh.

=== Books ===
- Nasukh
- A view of the Iranian school (Didi bar Maktabe Irani)
- Ancient Story (Dastan-e Bastan)
- The speeches of the Shahnameh (Goftar Haye Shahnameh)
- Memory and forgetting in the history and culture of Iranians – a sociological introduction
- Theories of social remembering
- Bozormehr Hakim

=== Articles ===
- Human rights in Shahnameh (Hoghoogh-e Bashar dar Shahnameh)
- All Shahnameh is a true account of history
- Ray and Tehran in Shahnameh (Rey va Tehran Dar Shahnameh)
- Woman in Shahnameh (Zan Dar Shahnameh)
- Legitimacy in Shahnameh (Mashroo'eiat Dar Shahnameh)
- Giving and judging in the Shahnameh (Dad va Dardgari Dar Shahnameh)
- Ancient ideas of Iran in Shahnameh (Andisheh Haye Kohan dar Shahnameh)
- Pathologies of Shahnameh research (AsibShenasi Haye Shahnameh Pajhouhi)
- Why is the history of the Achaemenids not mentioned in the Shahnameh
- Iranian school (Maktab-e Iran)

== Awards and nominations ==
- Nasukh's nominated in the "Book and Cinema" category at the 40th Tehran International Short Film Festival.
- Chosen of the festival of writers of the ancient land 2024 for Nasukh Book.
