= Generation M: Misogyny in Media & Culture =

Generation M: Misogyny in Media and Culture
- Directed by: Thomas Keith
- Written by: Thomas Keith
- Produced by: Thomas Keith
- Edited by: Thomas Keith, Michael Enriquez, Jonathan Bennett
- Distributed by: Media Education Foundation
- Release date: 2008
- Running time: 60 minutes
- Country: United States
- Language: English

Generation M: Misogyny in Media and Culture is a 2008 documentary film written, produced, and directed by Thomas Keith. It explores the issues of sexism and misogyny in American media and their effects.

== Background ==
Filmmaker Thomas Keith is a philosophy instructor at California State University, Long Beach, and California Polytechnic University. His specializations include American philosophy and pragmatism, with an emphasis on race, class, and gender. The film was distributed by the Media Education Foundation.

== Synopsis ==
The film is divided into five sections. "Female Empowerment?" discusses whether sexualization of women should be viewed as empowering. "The Doll Wars" is about sexualization of dolls such as Barbie and Bratz and its effects on girls. "Idealized Beauty" comments on the commercialization of beauty and the industries of dieting and cosmetics. "The Pink-Blue Dichotomy" focuses on the differences between socialization for boys and girls. "Misogyny and Double Standards" is about violence against women in video games or violent rhetoric by public figures.

It features interviews with the filmmakers Byron Hurt, Jackson Katz and Jean Kilbourne. They discuss topics including cultural norms of feminine beauty, which they view as unhealthy, and how particular activities or characterisations are gendered. The film cites statistics to make its case that misogyny is widespread in contemporary American media.

== Reception ==
Tricia Davis of Teaching Sociology reviewed that the film has a "clear thesis that shows how the media can play a major part in shaping our perceptions of girls and women". Davis found it appropriate for undergraduate sociology teaching, recommending its online study guide. J. Osicki of Library Journal criticized that the documentary is a "competent production" but fails to consider "what factors may be at the heart of gender-specific hostility" and lacks detail of "how both media and consumer awareness can be used by individuals to counter that negativity".

== See also ==
- Gender studies
