= Oversteer (film) =

2024 Singaporean film by Derrick Lui

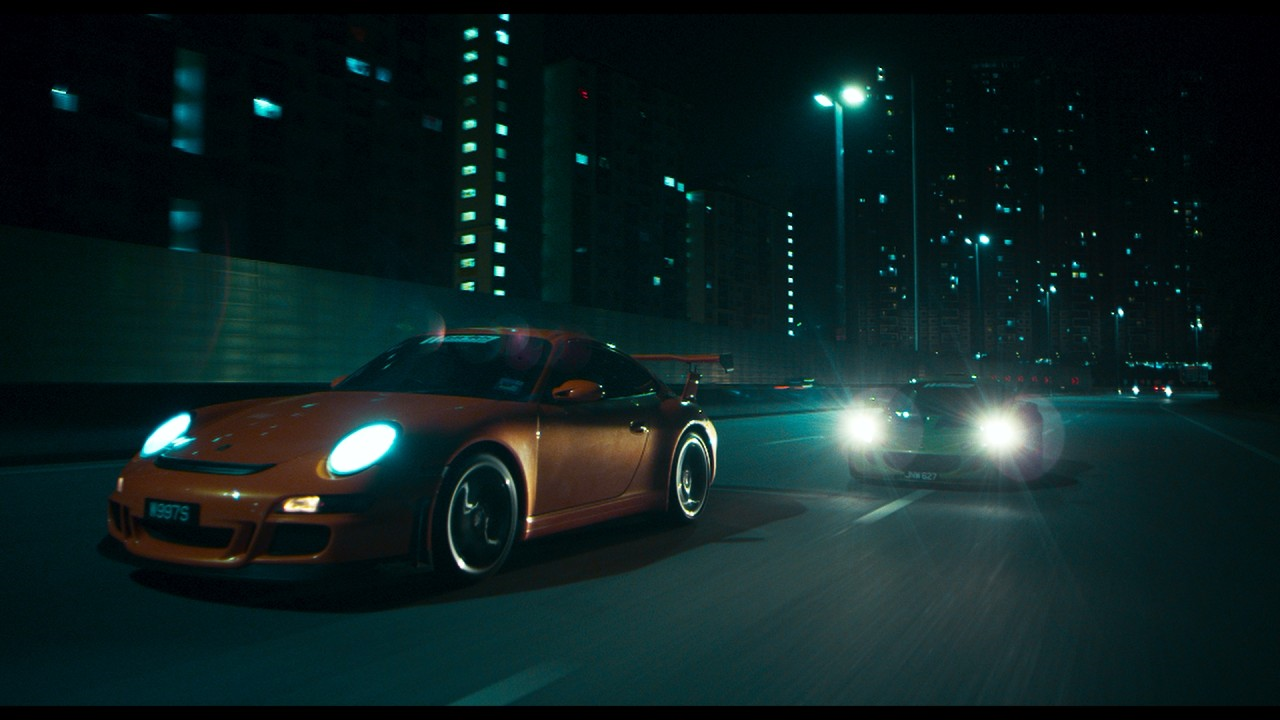
- Poster for the movie Oversteer (2024).
- Directed by: Derrick Lui
- Written by: Derrick Lui
- Produced by: Derrick Lui
- Starring: Zhang Yao Dong; Yu Tian Long; Hanrey Low; Jannassa Neo; Aden Tan
- Cinematography: Daven Raghavan
- Music by: Alex Oh
- Production company: Vogue Films
- Release date: 31 January 2024
- Running time: 86 minutes
- Country: Singapore
- Languages: Mandarin, Cantonese, English

Oversteer is a 2024 Singaporean comedy-action film directed by Derrick Lui, who also produced and wrote it. It marks what is billed as Singapore's first car-racing film, and was released theatrically on 31 January 2024.

== Plot ==
Oversteer is a film based on a true incident. It follows the story of Wind, a young man whose passion for cars creates tension within his family and leads him into challenges for which he is unprepared. As he faces personal and financial difficulties in the racing community, Wind receives support from unexpected allies. The film is set against the backdrop of auto racing and explores themes such as friendship, perseverance, and the pursuit of aspirations.

== Cast ==
- Aden Tan as Wind, the film's protagonist
- Yaodong Zhang as Tony, assumes the role of Tony, Wind’s father
- Yu Tian Long as Ah Long, the principal supporting cast
- Hanrey Low as Fu, portrays Wind’s close friend and mechanic partner
- Grace Teo as Grace, plays Wind’s sister
- Jannassa Neo as Cloud, plays Wind’s love interest
- Kazuto Soon as Kazuto
- Tammie Chew as Kelly (StepMum)
- Alan Tan as Alan (Cloud's Father)

== Production ==
The film was produced as a regional collaboration involving Singapore, Malaysia, Thailand, Hong Kong, and Myanmar. Director Derrick Lui developed the project over a period of ten years. After losing major funding, he self-financed the production. Principal photography was completed in 14 days in early 2020, and the film’s post-production process was affected by the COVID-19 pandemic as well as political instability in Myanmar following the 2021 coup.

== Release ==
Oversteer was released theatrically in Singapore on 31 January 2024, at Golden Village cinemas and in Malaysia, at Golden Screen Cinemas and TGV Cinemas.

== Themes/cultural significance ==
Oversteer holds a place in Singaporean cinema history as the first locally produced car-racing feature movie, breaking new ground in the industry's genre. At its core, the movie is an underdog story that mirror the filmmaker's decade-long struggle to realize a low-budget passion project driven by sheer determination and personal investment. These themes are echoed in the plot, which focuses on Fung (Wind), who, conflicted with his family, pursues his dreams of becoming a racer while navigating heartbreak, financial strain, and camaraderie.

The movie emphasizes authenticity in its depiction of motorsport, using real cars and professional drifters, all shot without the use of Computer-Generated Imagery. Its indie aesthetic, marked by intimate cinematography and grounded realism, stands in contrast to blockbuster racing movies, adding emotional texture and narrative immediacy.

Moreover, Oversteer illustrates regional collaboration in Southeast Asian filmmaking. Though a Singaporean team produced the movie, key sequences were filmed in Malaysia.

== Festivals and awards ==
Oversteer was submitted to several film festivals before and after its release, where it received recognition and industry awards. These include:

- 2025 – Best Feature Film and Best Director at the Vienna Independent Film Festival
- 2025 – Official Selection at the Vienna Independent Film Festival, Austria.
- 2025 – Opening Film, Official Selection, Best Feature Film at the Dili International Film Festival, Timor-Leste.
- 2025 – Official Selection at the Flight Deck Film Festival, New York, United States.
- 2025 – Official Selection at the Southern Cone International Film Festival, Valparaíso, Chile.
- 2025 – Official Selection at the Belgrade International Film Festival, Serbia.
- 2025 – In competition at the RED Movie Awards, Reims, France; received an Honorable Mention for Best Feature Film.
- 2025 – Official Selection at the Auguri Film Festival, Turin, Italy.
- 2025 – In competition at the Bangkok Movie Awards, Thailand; won Best Narrative Feature (LGBTQ category).
- 2025 – In competition at the Chambal International Film Festival, Kota, India; received a Special Mention.
- 2024 – Official Selection at the Oltre lo specchio Film Festival, Milan, Italy.
- 2024 – Official Selection at the Blue Chair Film Festival, Luang Prabang, Laos.
- 2024 – In competition at the London International CINEVERSE Film Festival, United Kingdom; nominated for Best Director and Best Actor (Aden Tan).
- 2024 – Official Selection at the Begur Costa Brava International Comedy Film Festival, Begur, Spain.
- 2024 – In competition at the Urban Action Showcase, New York, United States; won Best Action Comedy.
- 2024 – In competition at the International Motor Film Awards, London, United Kingdom; nominated for Best Drama Feature.
- 2024 – Official Selection at the Hokkaido Film Festival, Japan.
- 2022 – Participated in the NAFF Project Market at the Bucheon International Fantastic Film Festival (BIFAN), South Korea; won the NAFF SBA Award.
- 2017 – Selected for the Asia Film Financing Forum (HAF), Hong Kong.
