= 52 Hertz (film) =

- Directed by: Asghar Abbasi
- Written by: Mostafa Beiranvand; Asghar Abbasi
- Produced by: Narges Zare
- Starring: Ramin Maraghi; Tannaz Rezaee; Narges Derakhshan; Payam Rahimi
- Distributed by: MAFiLM
- Release date: 25 July 2020
- Running time: 14 minutes
- Country: Iran
- Language: Persian
- Budget: 500 USD

52 Hertz is an Iranian short film directed by Asghar Abbasi. This movie was filmed in one shot of 14 minutes. 52 Hertz has been named the international film festival of Spain's Tersa.
