= Nasukh (book) =

Persian book (2023)

- Author: Mohammad Rasouli
- Language: Persian
- Genre: Persians Story
- Publisher: Sabzan
- Publication date: 2023
- Publication place: Iran
- Pages: 80 (first edition)
- Awards: Cinema and book section at TISFF 2023
- ISBN: 978-600-117-630-2

Nasukh (Persian: ناسوخ) is a story by Mohammad Rasouli, an Iranian writer. Nasukh is influenced by historical philosophy and is written with a mysterious look at the myths of Iran. At the same time, it deals with the issues of the time and the present day.

== Cinematic adaption ==
Iranian cinematographer Asghar Abbasi based the short film Nasukh on the story. The film was nominated in the "Book and Cinema" category at the 40th Tehran International Short Film Festival.
