= W (2022 film) =

2022 film

- Official film poster
- Directed by: Anna Eriksson
- Written by: Anna Eriksson
- Produced by: Anna Eriksson
- Starring: Anna Eriksson
- Cinematography: Matti Pyykkö
- Edited by: Anna Eriksson
- Music by: Anna Eriksson
- Release dates: 9 August 2022 (Locarno Film Festival); 23 September 2022 (Finland)
- Running time: 102 minutes
- Country: Finland
- Languages: French, Cantonese

W is a 2022 Finnish dystopian experimental film directed by Anna Eriksson. It premiered at the 2022 Locarno Film Festival out of competition.

== Cast ==
- Anna Eriksson as Madame Europe
- Hanna Trygg as nurse
- Jussi Parviainen as revolutionary
- Parco Lee as Chinese man-machine
- Jooseppi Pyykkö
- Iida Rauma as nurse
- Ninja Sarasalo as nurse
- Karina Kivilahti as nurse
- Kirsi Nisonen as nurse
- Marianna Uutinen as nurse
- Eeva Trygg as nurse
- Minttu Vesala as nurse

== Plot ==
In a desolate, snowbound land, the dying Madame Europa desperately clings to life with the help of her enigmatic Chinese male companion. Meanwhile, within an icy institute, a group of nurses diligently continue their strange and seemingly senseless tasks until their trance is shattered by the arrival of a stranger.

== Awards ==
The film received the Best Director, Best Actress (Anna Eriksson) and Best Art Direction awards at the 2023 Prague Independent Film Festival.

At the 2023 Vienna Independent Film Festival the film received Best Feature Film and Best Film Score awards.

== See also ==
- M (2018 Finnish film)
