= Sobh International Media Festival =

Sobh Media Festival
- Location: Tehran, Iran
- Founded: March 11, 2023
- Awards: Festival Trophy; Plaque of Honor
- Language: Persian; English
- Website: sobhfestival.com

Sobh Media Festival is a film and media festival held in Tehran, Iran. It was inaugurated in 2023 by the World Service of the Islamic Republic of Iran Broadcasting (IRIB), with the objective of facilitating connections between international program producers and fostering interactions among them.

== First edition ==
The First edition of Sobh Media Festival was held on March 11, 2023 at IRIB Conference Center. Some Iranian top governmental officials and media activists attended the event.

The competition lineup was consisted of channels of the IRIB World Service including Sahar, Al-Kawthar, Press TV, Al-Alam, iFilm, Hausa TV, Hispan TV, Iran Press News Agency, the radio collection channels, and the 30-language Pars-Today website.

The channels screened their latest productions for the juries of Sobh Media Festival.

Among the top winners were Iran Press News Agency which grabbed two awards for best podcast (Ahmad Shirzadian) and motion graphics (Reza Momeni) at the 2023 edition of the event.

== Second edition ==
The second edition of Sobh Media Festival, under the direction of Mohsen Yazdi, started its work with the publication of the invitations and the unveiling of the poster, Tuesday, January 23.

== Third edition ==
For its third edition, Sobh Media Festival received 4,160 entries from 39 countries, including the Netherlands, Argentina, Tunisia, Afghanistan, Russia, Peru, South Korea, Lebanon, Qatar, Syria, Italy, the UK, Singapore, Germany, Brazil, the United States, China, Ireland, and Palestine.

Of these submissions, 533 entries were dedicated to the Palestine section, while 3,627 were submitted as part of the main competition.

The festival’s categories included television programs, news blogs, visual arts, music videos, short films, documentaries, and animated shorts within the Palestine section.

It also welcomed entries in its main section that included social media content, radio programs, podcasts, written works, motion graphics, news reports, documentaries, and television programs.

Among the foreign dignitaries participating in the year’s festival were former British Member of Parliament George Galloway and former Irish Members of the European Parliament Mick Wallace and Clare Daly.

== Main Section ==
- TV Series
- Talk Shows
- Magazine Shows
- Documentaries
- News Reports and Features
- Motion Graphics
- Articles: Feature, Viewpoint, Investigation
- Radio Programs and Podcasts
- Social Media Content: Videocasts, Animations, Short Films, Vlogs

=== Special Palestine Section ===
- Feature Films
- Music Videos
- Short Films
- Short Animations
- Illustrations
- News Blogs
- TV Programs
- Documentaries

Market Section:

== Awards ==
- Best TV Series
- Best Documentary
- Best Talk Show
- Best Magazine Show
- Best News Report
- Best Motion Graphics
- Best Radio Program and Podcast
- Best Social Media Post
- Best Videocast
- Best Animation
- Best Short Film
- Best Vlog
- Best Article

=== Special Palestine Section ===
- Best Feature Film
- Best Video Clip
- Best Short Film
- Best News Blogger
- Best Short Animation
- Best Illustration
- Best TV Program
- Best Documentary

== Fourth edition ==
The fourth edition of Sobh Media Festival, directed by Ehsan Kaveh, calls for media productions in two sections: the main section and the special section for Palestine. The deadline for registration and submission of works is January 21, 2026. Still, this year’s event features three special awards:

The “1500th Birth Anniversary of the Holy Prophet of Islam (PBUH)” Award will be granted to the best media work or initiative that introduces the life, teachings, and message of the Prophet.

The “Sahar Emami” Special Award honors a journalist who courageously tells the truth. Nominations for this award can be submitted by the journalists themselves, another individual, or a media organization.

The “BRICS” Award will be presented to a media work or initiative that best showcases the capacities, relationships, and collaborations among BRICS member countries, promoting convergence and unity. Given BRICS’s influential role in global affairs—spanning sustainable development, trade, and international policy—the award seeks to highlight works that accurately portray the economic, political, and cultural interactions among the member states and contribute to global understanding of the alliance and its impact on international developments.

== Awards ==
Festival Categories: Main Section:

1. Television Series

2. Talk Show Format TV Program

3. Mixed-Format TV Program

4. Documentary (cinematic and television)

5. News Report – A type of report that uses images and videos to quickly and accurately cover a news event.

6. Narrative Report – A report that tells a story or describes an event using visuals and sound, often with minimal text, conveying a specific message or information.

7. Motion Graphics

8. Written Content

Feature Story, one that deeply explores a specific topic, focusing on storytelling and engaging details. Its goal is to attract readers through compelling narratives and accessible analysis. These articles often address current and significant issues, aiming to create emotional or intellectual connections with the audience. They are typically written by journalists and reporters.

Viewpoint Article, one that presents the author’s personal perspective or analysis on a particular subject, often aiming to persuade readers to accept the writer’s stance. Compared to research articles, it relies less on data and more on reasoning to support the argument. Topics usually relate to impactful societal or contemporary issues, presented from a fresh and unique angle. The tone is assertive and emphasizes the author’s viewpoint. These articles are generally written by experienced experts.

Investigative Report, one that is based on thorough and comprehensive research, using credible evidence and data to support its claims. It aims to uncover hidden truths or examine significant issues, with its findings deeply analyzed. The purpose of such articles is to drive change, raise awareness, or promote reform within society. All stages of the investigation are conducted with scientific rigor and ethical standards, and the article follows a clear and organized structure. These articles are typically written by professional and experienced journalists.

9. Radio: Productions and Podcasts:

Podcast – Serialized audio programs produced on various topics, available online for streaming or download.

Radio Documentary – A program that deeply investigates a specific topic or event, including research and interviews.

Radio Drama – An audio story that uses dialogue, music, and sound effects to create an immersive experience.

Talk Show Format – Programs focused on conversations and interviews with various guests.

Mixed-Format Program – Shows that combine different types of content such as interviews, music, and news.

Technology and AI-Based Program – Programs that utilize modern technologies and artificial intelligence for content production and analysis.

10. Social Media Section:

Animation – Narrative, educational, or promotional works created using various animation techniques such as 2D, 3D, stop motion, and others. Recommended duration: up to 10 minutes.

Short Film – A video production with a narrative, documentary, or experimental structure. Recommended duration including: up to 15 minutes.

Videocast – A visual podcast focused primarily on the topic of discussion rather than the individuals on screen. Typically, more professional, longer, and structured than vlogs, videocasts are presented episodically with hosts and guests, and are commonly published on platforms like YouTube or dedicated channels. Recommended duration: 10 to 90 minutes.

Vlog – Personal and informal video content created by individuals, emphasizing their personality and perspective. Usually short and shared on social media platforms like Instagram or TikTok, in vertical (9:16) or horizontal (16:9) formats. Recommended duration: up to 20 minutes.

Palestine Section: 1. Feature Film

2. Music

3. Best Documentary

4. Best TV Program

5. Music Video, one that primarily focuses on the fusion of music and visuals. In this type of video, the song or musical piece serves as the central element, while images and graphics are used to enhance the message or emotion conveyed by the music.

6. Short Film

7. Short Animation

8. Illustration and Visual Arts that include conceptual illustration, posters, caricatures, artistic photography, motion graphics, typography, and calligraphy.
