= M (2018 Finnish film) =

2018 film

- Film poster
- Directed by: Anna Eriksson
- Written by: Anna Eriksson
- Produced by: Anna Eriksson
- Starring: Anna Eriksson
- Cinematography: Matti Pyykkö
- Edited by: Anna Eriksson
- Music by: Anna Eriksson
- Release dates: 6 September 2018 (Venice); 30 September 2018
- Running time: 90 minutes
- Country: Finland
- Language: English

M is a 2018 Finnish experimental film directed by Anna Eriksson. It was screened in the Venice International Film Critics' Week section at the Venice Film Festival. The film is loosely inspired by the last days of Marilyn Monroe.

== Plot summary ==
M reimagines Marilyn Monroe’s final days through dreamlike, unsettling imagery, blending reality with nightmares to portray her fear, vulnerability and emotional collapse.

== Cast ==
- Anna Eriksson (M)
- Petri Salo (The psychiatrist)
- Gail Ferguson (Georgia)
- Axel Sutinen (Gardener)
- Ari Vieno (The man in the car)
- José Paiva Wolff (Ruby, The make up artist)
- Quim-Ze Grilo (Anubis)
- Gloria Bleezard-Levister (Melody Manners)
- Alonso Levister (The TV-show host)
- Susana Gonçalo (The girl in the veil)
- Steve Remigio Delgado (Abraham)
- Issey O’Brien (Psychiatrist daughter)
- Veera Siivonen (The girl in the car)
- Joni Segerros (The boy in the car)

== Awards ==
The film received the Grand Prix and Best Feature Film awards at the 2019 Prague Independent Film Festival.

At the 2019 Vienna Independent Film Festival the film received Best Feature Film and Best Cinematography awards.

Best director Tarkovsky Award 2019 The Blow-up Arthouse Film Festival, Chicago

The Book on M https://parvs.fi/en/books/m/?lang_switched=1

Art Exhibition Anna Eriksson M The Rituals of a Lonely B...h 5.9.2020 Rauma Art Museum https://www.raumantaidemuseo.fi/en/exhibitions/upcoming-exhibitions/

== See also ==
- W (2022 film)
