= Nasukh (film) =

- Directed by: Asghar Abbasi
- Written by: Mostafa Beiranvand; Asghar Abbasi
- Produced by: Asghar Abbasi
- Starring: Ghorban Najafi; Siamak Adib; Shiva Taheri
- Cinematography: Mehrdad Afrasiabi
- Distributed by: MAFiLM
- Release date: 15 August 2023
- Running time: 20 minutes
- Country: Iran
- Language: Persian
- Budget: 20,000 USD

Nasukh is a 2023 Iranian surreal short film written and directed by Asghar Abbasi. This film deals with the conditions of Iran in the 14th century from the perspective of Ferdowsi's Shahnameh. Nasukh is taken from the story of Nasukh book written by Mohammad Rasouli, Shahnameh scholar and Iranian writer. Nominated for the "Book and Cinema" special section of the 40th Tehran International Short Film Festival.

== Awards and nominations ==
- Nominated for the "Book and Cinema" special section of the 40th Tehran International Short Film Festival
- Nominated for the None-English Film of the Edo State International Film Festival
