= Asghar Abbasi =

Iranian director and filmmaker

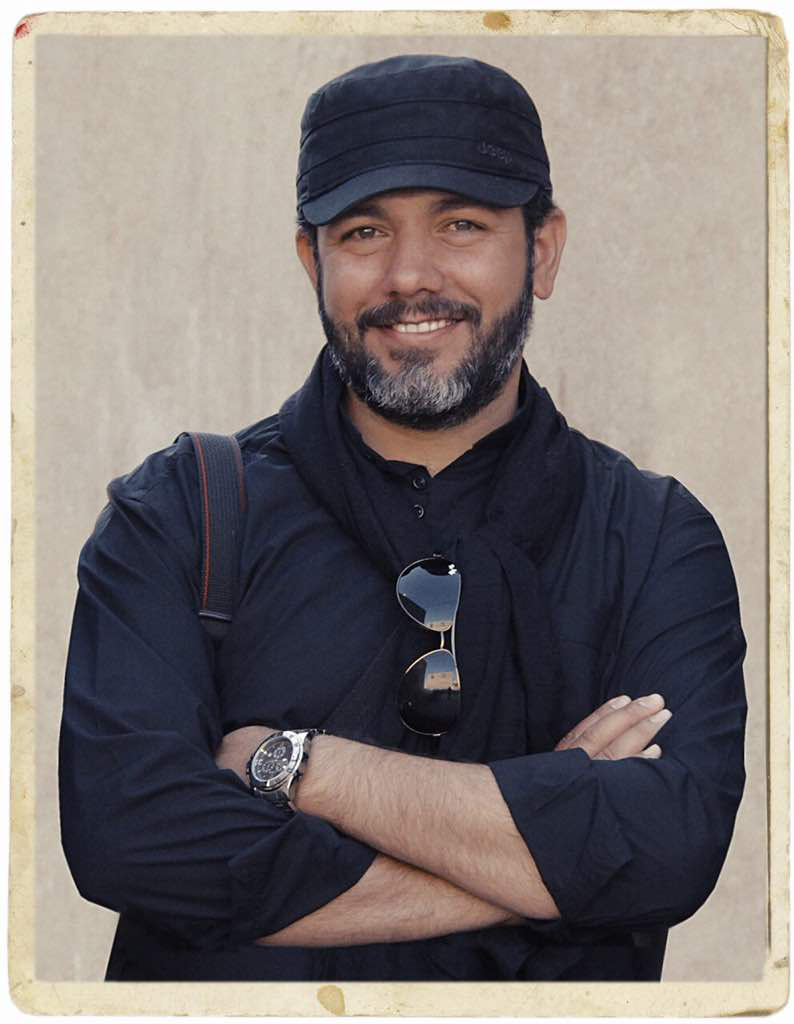
- Abbasi in 2018
- Born: 1 December 1980 (age 44); Yazd, Iran
- Occupations: Film Director; Producer; Writer
- Known for: Nasukh; SETiN; Royaye Nime Shab; 52 Hertz; Eight O'clock
- Awards: Best Director AIPFF Award

Asghar Abbasi (Persian: اصغر عباسی, born 1 December 1980 in Yazd, Iran) is an Iranian short film director, writer and producer. He is the winner of the golden lantern statue for the best director for the film A Dream That Is Not White from Ammar International Popular Film Festival.

== Career ==
Abbasi graduated from the Iranian Youth Cinema Society and graduated with a master's degree in cinema directing from Nowshahr University of Art and Architecture.

== Filmography ==
Year	Title	Director	Writer	Notes	Ref(s)
2016	Royaye Nime Shab	Yes	Yes	Short film	
2016	52 Hertz	Yes	Yes	Short film	
2017	Flag	Yes	No	Short film	
2018	Yek Jabejayi	Yes	Yes	Short film	
2019	SETiN	Yes	Yes	Short film, also editor	
2020	Bells	Yes	Yes	Also co-producer	
2022	Eight O'clock	No	No	Also co-producer	
2022	A Dream That Is Not White	Yes	Yes	Also co-producer	
2023	Nasukh	Yes	Yes	Short film	

== Awards and nominations ==
Name of award ceremony, year presented, category, nominee, and nomination result
Award	Year	Category	Nominated Work	Result	Ref.
Tehran International Short Film Festival	2017	Best Director	A dream that is not white	Won	
HECare Film Festival Canada	2020	Human rights film	SETiN	Nominated	
Tehran International Short Film Festival	2023	Cinema and book section	Nasukh	Nominated	
Edo state international film festival	2023	Best Non-English Film	Nasukh	Nominated	
