= Theaters of War =

American documentary film

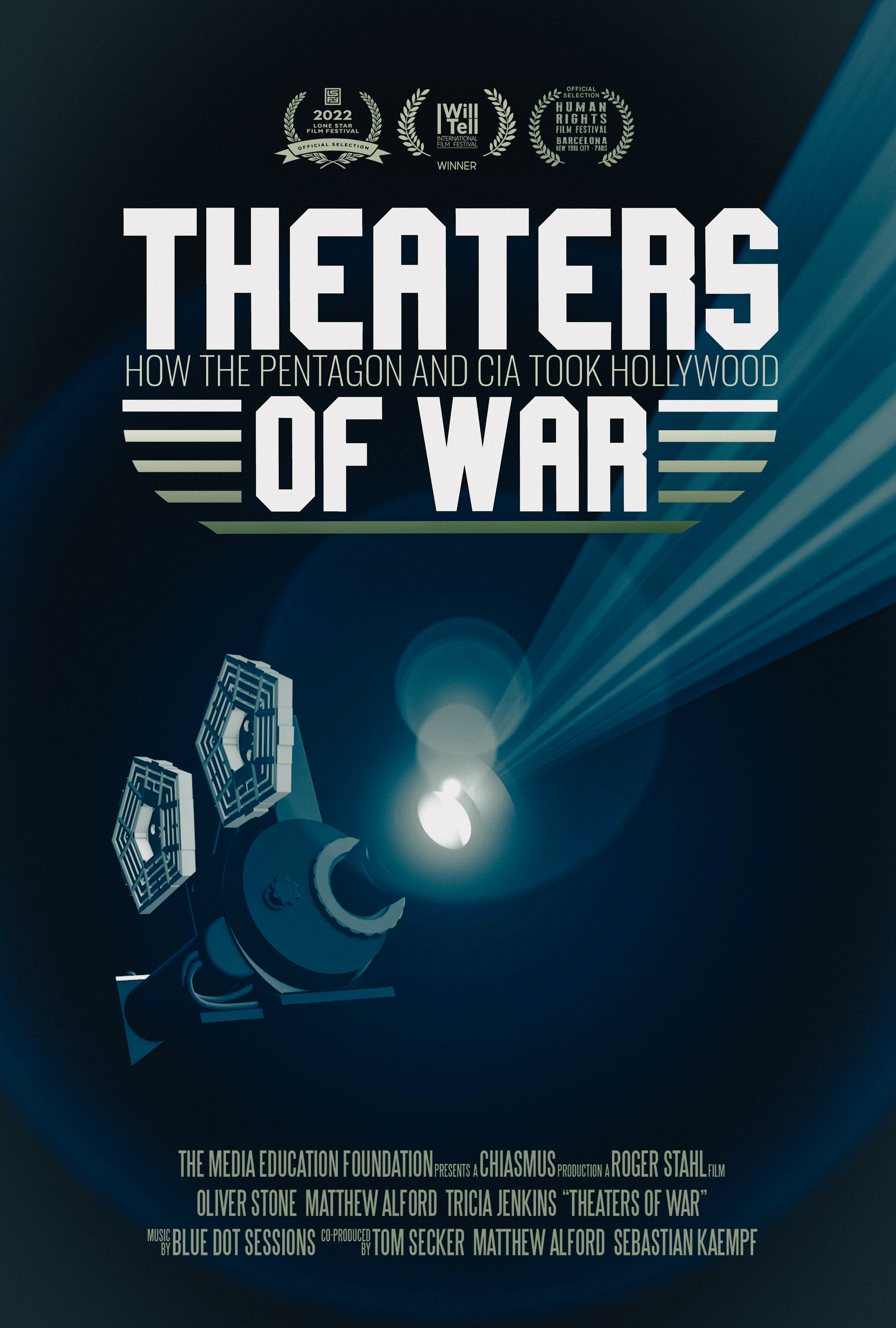
- Directed by: Roger Stahl
- Produced by: Matthew Alford; Tom Secker; Sebastian Kaempf; Roger Stahl
- Starring: Oliver Stone; Matthew Alford; Tricia Jenkins
- Edited by: Roger Stahl
- Production company: Chiasmus Films
- Distributed by: Media Education Foundation; Scorpion TV
- Release date: May 5, 2022
- Running time: 87 minutes
- Country: United States

Theaters of War is a 2022 American documentary film that probes the influence of the Pentagon and CIA in shaping Hollywood and television scripts. The film examines a trove of internal state documents in addition to interviewing academics, government officials, veterans, and industry players like Oliver Stone.

== Production ==
The film is directed, edited, and narrated by Communication Studies professor Roger Stahl and co-produced by Matthew Alford, Tom Secker and Sebastian Kaempf. Source material consists of thousands of pages of internal state documents acquired by Tom Secker through the Freedom of Information Act and thousands more acquired by Roger Stahl from various archival sites. Some case studies draw analysis from Matthew Alford and Tom Secker's National Security Cinema and David Robb's Operation Hollywood.

== Reception ==
The film's release coincided with the release of the military-supported blockbuster Top Gun: Maverick, which Stahl wrote about in an editorial for the Los Angeles Times. After selling on online platforms, Theaters of War premiered at the 2022 Lone Star Film Festival and later won Best Feature Documentary at the 2023 I Will Tell Festival. CounterPunch called it a "fantastic new film [that performs] an important public service." Academy Award-nominated screenwriter and journalist David Sirota called it a "must-see documentary." Journalist and media watchdog Norman Solomon described it as "dramatic smoking-gun evidence of methodical and deadly manipulation." Comedian Alexei Sayle discussed the film's content before joking how the CIA would rewrite ITV's soap opera Emmerdale in an episode of Alexei Sayle's Imaginary Sandwich Bar. Chris Moukarbel featured the film in his 2024 documentary The Honey Trap on Paramount+.

== See also ==
- Military-entertainment complex
