= Media Education Foundation =

Nonprofit organization (e. 1992)

The Media Education Foundation is a nonprofit organization established in 1992 that produces and distributes documentary films about the impact of American mass media. Their films focus on topics such as gender, race and representation, health, class, consumerism, capitalism, politics, and the environment, with the purpose of encouraging critical thought about the media, its effects on viewers, and on the world more broadly.

Sut Jhally founded the Media Education Foundation after receiving a cease and desist letter from MTV, whose music video clips he had compiled to create a video for use as a teaching tool about sexism and the objectification of women in popular culture. He countered that the work was protected under the fair use doctrine and that his intent was to use the clip for educational purposes only. Jhally subsequently founded the Media Education Foundation as a platform for distributing other films regarding media awareness and its impact.

Films include Dreamworlds (2007), War Made Easy (2007), Hijacking Catastrophe (2004), Peace, Propaganda & the Promised Land (2004), Theaters of War (2022), and the series of films on women in advertising Killing Us Softly (1979–2010).
