= Misogyny and mass media =

Examples of misogyny exist in many published forms, within multiple cultures and well-observed works. Technological advances in the modern era have contributed proficient means to media and marketing to the resultant mass media in the 21st century. The merging of misogyny and mass media has made numerous examples where studies have concluded correlations between misogynous messages, both obvious and subliminal. Corresponding physical appearance of violence and hateful conduct may be seen relative to exposure.

== Music, violence, and aggression ==
Messages containing misogynous views are found commonly in the media. Cooper (1985) found after analyzing popular music over 30 years, that there was a tendency to describe women in terms of physical attributes or as evil, as possessions of men, or as dependent upon men. Dietz states that the concept of masculinity has come to be associated with sexual aggression. It is thought that audiences of unpunished violent behavior, compared to audiences of punished violent behavior are more likely to take part in violence. Some musical themes and lyrics can be compared to the negative attitude toward women found within some pornographic movies and magazines. This negative attitude and acceptance of violence towards women shows the possible likelihood of rape or sexual coercion. Fischer and Greitemeyer found that men who listened to sexually aggressive music reported that their relationship with women was more troublesome. Media Violence research has found that aggressive music adds an accessibility of aggressive related attitudes and emotions. Roberta Hamilton in her book Does Misogyny Matter? (1987) stated, "Misogyny is not a word useful simply for describing particularly nasty bits of behavior, but rather it directs us to a set of relations, attitudes, and behaviors that are embedded within all social relations" (p. 123). Violence in the form of linguistics is in fact a form of physical violence.

Rubin, West and Mitchell (2001) found that many studies have seen consumers of rap and heavy metal music as having more hostile attitudes, higher sexual activity and more drug use than consumers of other music.

=== Gangsta rap ===
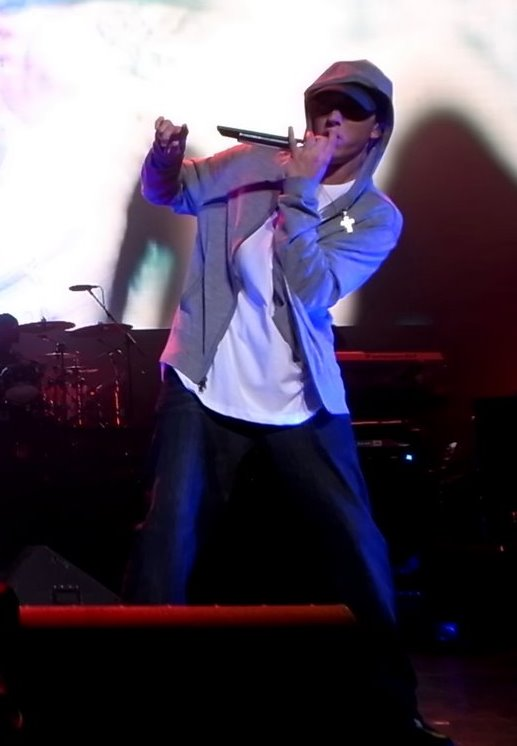
Eminem performing live at the DJ Hero Party in Los Angeles

Themes of misogyny can be seen in much gangsta rap (GR) music. This music elevates degradations of women such as rape, torment, and violence. In a study conducted by Armstrong in 2001, he found after examining 490 GR songs, that 22 percent contained violent and misogynist lyrics. Wester, Crown, Quatman, and Heesacker state that, "The increasing popularity of GR, coupled with documentation of society's increased sexism, domestic violence, sexual assault and other forms of degradation of women suggest that perhaps GR is partly to blame for an increase in anti-female attitudes and behaviors. It is difficult to tell whether GR directly causes misogynous attitudes or if it serves to increase preexisting anti-female cultural values. The difference between rap music and other types of music is that the lyrics are generally the main focus of attention. Rappers seem to commit themselves to worst impulses by telling their stories in the first-person.

In a study conducted by Barongan and Hall (1995), they had male college students listen to rap music with misogynous or neutral song lyrics. After listening to the different music, they viewed three different vignettes. These vignettes were either sexual-violent, neutral, or assaultive. Then the students were asked to choose one of the three vignettes to show a female. Those who had listened to the misogynous music were significantly more likely to show the female the assaultive vignette.

Regarding gangsta rap Yo-Yo states that, "The harder that you are, sad to say, the more you sell".

=== Hip-hop ===
Misogyny was not found in rap music until the 1980s even though it had been in the commercial market for 10 years. Some artists such as 2 Live Crew, Ice-T, and N.W.A. integrated misogynous lyrics into their rap songs. Women are reduced to objects – specifically objects that are only good for abuse, sex and for the most part are just trouble for men within misogynous rap. Using such misogynistic lyrics allows degradation of their female counterparts while boosting themselves up.

This acceptance of misogyny can be seen in many rap lyrics. For example, in N.W.A's "She Swallowed It" (1991) gives a clear description;

Punch the bitch in the eye/ then the ho will fall to the ground/ Then you open up her mouth/ put your dick, move the shit around.

— N.W.A, "She Swallowed It"

Scenes of physical harm can be seen in Too $hort "All My Bitches Are Gone"(1993);

You fuck with us, bitch, something gettin' broken/ Your leg, arm, jaw, nose, pick a part.

— Too $hort, "All My Bitches Are Gone"

The artist Eminem is well known for his rap music containing extremely misogynous lyrics. In 2002 his Album The Eminem Show sold 7.4 million copies.

=== Heavy metal ===
In a study conducted by Lawrence and Joyner with research participants who were white males between the ages of 18 and 24 and reported belonging to Protestant religious denominations (p. 52), it was found that the research participants exposed to sexually violent heavy metal music were found to have a higher tendency on sex-role stereotyping in comparison to those who listened to classical music. Nine participants (12%) indicated that their typical music listening preference was heavy-metal rock music; these participants were equally distributed across cells of the data collection (p. 52). Researchers suggest that; distrust, assault, and negative regard for women are common attitudes experienced by fans of different types of rock music.

Although the conclusions made in article must be correct, the article examines misogyny in a very specific context. It is not that the entirely of heavy metal rock music is misogynistic, it is the specific instances within these contexts that must be addressed. There is misogyny within heavy metal rock music through sexually violent content that must be addressed by the smaller interactions between people. In order to correctly identify misogyny in the heavy metal rock industry, the people identifying and critiquing must be familiar with the platform and musical techniques so that biases are not clouding a whole musical discipline.

=== Inconclusive link ===
Most violent lyrics are not heard due to the fact a large number of listeners are not actually listening to the lyrics. This is very different from video-based media, in which the audience can see the violent message very clearly. It has also been found that some rock lyrics are so distorted that people just assume what they are actually saying. A majority of people often listen to just the music and not the lyrics while some listen to it while focusing on other tasks.

Rap music also may contain positive images. Zillman et al. proposed that rap music is used as a way to fight oppression from the dominant culture. It was also found by Kubrin that 68 percent of all gangsta rap's focal point is about respect. It is a "cultural response to historic oppression and racism, [and] a system for communication among black communities throughout the United States." With both gleeful and aggressive views on the situation of black Americans, Hip Hop artists were spread reality and lessons learned in a way that is understandable by a younger generation. Some call it a "street-leveling language".

== Violent and aggressive videos ==
=== In music ===
AMTV, the name of MTV's music programming since 2009

Felson, professor of crime, law, and justice and sociology at Penn State, states that a crowd of onlookers enjoys a street fight just as the Romans enjoyed the gladiators. Found frequently in MTV music videos are images of crime, sex, dance, visual abstraction and violence. Audiences of MTV tend to be between the ages of fourteen and thirty-four, therefore has potential of contributing to cultural norms. Smith and Boyson found that fifteen percent of music videos contain violence. Before the introduction of music videos, research found that both music and television retained adolescents' attention, but music effectively connected with their emotions. It is far more common to see a man being dominant over a woman, rather than a woman being dominant over a man in music videos. A study conducted by Rich, Woods, Goodman, Emans, and DuRant found that out of 518 music videos and among the 391 acts of violence the aggressors were 78 percent male and the victims were 46 percent female. The need for artists to fill hours of airtime on television make certain that artists and their videos increasingly become more shocking, as to be noticed. Violence and sex or the combination of the two, are most often used for a shocking effect on viewers.

Findings in a 2012 article by Tobias Greitemeyer and Jack Hollingdale titled, "Changing the Track in Music and Misogyny: Listening to Music With Pro-Equality Lyrics Improves Attitudes and Behavior Toward Women" [1]that the notion that media exposure may not only harm attitudes toward women (as previous research has documented), it may even improve people' images of women (p.61). The authors note that in their study they found it is likely the content of the lyrics that drives the effect a song has on people, and not the mood and arousal properties of the song. It is also noted that a variety of songs were used through their studies, making their findings not limited to a specific group of songs (p.64). Taking into consideration the emerging research into the effects that media has on people and how large of a role mass media plays on public opinions, it would be worthwhile to use music as a way to dismantle the misogyny embedded within the streams of mass media.

==== Rock ====
In a content analysis of rock music videos, Vincent, Davis and Boruszkowski found that 57 percent showed women in a "patronizing" way (such as; victims, sex objects, and stupid) and 20 percent of them were found placed in traditional sex roles (domestic, motherly, and submissive), another eight percent demonstrated women receiving violence from a male. The amount where women were shown as equal to men was only fourteen percent. Lawrence and Joyner found in their research of rock music videos that even after a brief exposure of seventeen minutes there was appearance of negative effects on men's attitudes toward women. It is stated later in the article that since there are no radio stations that feature heavy-metal music in the geographic area where this study was conducted, participants' limited prior exposure may explain why they were not differentially affected by the lyrical message.

==== Rap ====
Johnson et al. found that women portrayed in sexually inferior roles in rap music videos have increased girls' acceptance of teen dating violence. They also found that these videos did not increase boys' acceptance of teen violence. Sommers-Flanagan found that not only are women shown in a position of submission to men, they are also shown in a more negative light than men in rap music videos. Conrad et al. found that recent (2009) rap music videos emphasize themes of misogyny, materialism and women tend to be placed in a position of objectification.

In addition to women being placed in objectified positions, they are "criticized and loved at the same time for being covered up versus being scantily dressed." Women in the rap industry are most commonly only mentioned by the media when it is to further stigmatize men, or to promote the stereotype that all black women are on welfare or are gold-diggers.

=== Video games ===
In a 1998 study conducted by Tracy L. Dietz, professor of Sociology and Anthropology at the University of Central Florida, sampled 33 prominent Nintendo and Sega games and found that nearly 80 percent of the video games had some violence and aggression as part of the main strategy or object. Dietz claimed that violence was directed specifically towards women in 21% of the games sampled. Also in 28 percent of the games women were, according to Dietz, seen as sex objects and in 41 percent of the games there were no female characters. Overall Dietz asserted that most video games minimize the role of females or leave females out of the game all together, and that when females were shown they were usually depicted in a supporting role to men or dependent upon the male. Women were also seen as contributing less than males and were their sex objects. Dietz stated that these depictions of women may allow boys and girls to internalize and accept the thought that women are victims, weak, and sex objects.

== Violent pornography ==
By making misogyny sexual, pornography teaches misogyny to its viewers. Negative effects from pornography have been thought to occur due to a violence component, and not to a sexual component. Males who have been previously enraged by a female are more likely to produce aggression against a female after being shown pornography depicting violence. The combination of sex and aggression is increasingly being shown within pornographic material, therefore could be a possible trigger for aggressively willing men to physical assault accessible women. The attorney general's commission found that viewing of sexually aggressive pornography is causally connected to sexual violent behavior. Sexual violence portrayed in pornography as pleasurable to the victim may increase approval of sexual coercion, there by relating to sexual violence. A common theme found within pornography is women enjoying victimization. This theme can be seen to give reason for violence and decrease general inhibitions against aggression.

=== Usenet ===
Barron and Kimmel found that Usenet contains less consensual sex and more coercive sex in the scenes depicted. Within Usenet it was found that 62.7 percent of the scenes had a male perpetrators and only 42.4 percent of the scenes contained female perpetrators. Victims within Usenet was found to be females 84.7 percent of the time. At nearly no expense Usenet offers the greatest access to the largest number of viewers.

=== Influencing misogyny ===
A summary of the effects of pornography research by Linz and Donnerstein (1989) concluded that depictions of sexual violence in the media, under some conditions, promote antisocial attitudes and behavior. Linz and Donnerstein focused on the detrimental effects of exposure to violent images in pornography portraying the myth that women enjoy or in some way benefit from rape, torture, or other forms of sexual violence. Other research has found similar outcomes (e.g., Allen et al., 1995). The viewing of coercive pornography relates to the strongest acceptance of rape myths, i.e. women want to be raped, women "ask for it", women want to be forced. Considering the commodification and objectification argument, concern exists that repeated exposure to coercive pornographic stimuli relates to increasingly negative attitudes toward women. More frequent use increased the dehumanizing effect of Internet pornography and led to more acceptance of violence toward women.

Pornography has been found to desensitize societies to violence against women, inspiring rapes and contributing to the sexual subordination of women to men (2009). Making their materials, pornographers exploit existing inequality between the sexes to coerce women and children to perform unwanted or dangerous sexual acts as a form of prostitution. Existing legal regulations in democratic societies have not approached pornography with these realities in mind, but usually rather as a right protected by freedom of expression, or as an "obscene" expression offending the public rather than harming any particular group. In rare but important instances, pornography has legally been seen as a harmful practice violating women's human or democratic rights to equality.

Most studies consistently show that after exposure to pornography and other forms of misogynistic media depicting degradation of women and rape, including hip hop and rap, viewers show attitudes that are less sympathetic to rape victims and more tolerant and accepting of violence toward women – in effect, such behavior becomes more "normalized" and "mainstreamed. It's desensitizing and addictive potentials are well-documented in its users."

== Internet misogyny ==
Internet misogyny is enacted in different forms and on different platforms. When one objectifies or harasses online, they are likely doing so anonymously and using shaming tactics to stigmatize the victim's identity or body. In this anonymity, the objectifier averts all real-life responsibility while nonetheless enforcing real-life consequences for the woman. This tactic of anonymity fosters Internet objectification because it allows the objectifier to create a desired situation where the woman deals with the responsibilities instead of the objectifier.

Scholars describe these forms of harassment as networked misogyny, where hostility toward women is not only individual but structurally enabled by online platforms. Through features such as anonymity, algorithmic visibility, and rapid content sharing, digital spaces allow misogynistic messages to circulate widely and organize coordinated backlash campaigns. A widely discussed example was the Twitter hashtag #MasculinitySoFragile (2015), which began as satire about toxic masculinity but quickly prompted counter-hashtags, threats, and doxxing from men’s rights communities who framed feminist critique as an attack on male identity. Researchers further argue that online misogyny disproportionately targets women of colour and other marginalized groups, linking platform-based abuse to longer histories of racialized gender violence in both media and society. International organizations such as UN Women have highlighted that misogynistic content can rapidly cross borders through social media, shaping youth culture in multiple countries and generating policy concerns about online gender-based violence.

The circulation and visibility of misogynistic content online have also been linked to the underlying logic of social media algorithms. Technology journalists and scholars argue that recommendation systems prioritize engagement over safety or accuracy, amplifying sensational or antagonistic posts—including misogynistic material—because such content generates high interaction. Researchers note that this creates a “distorted and sensationalised mirror” of public sentiment, undermining claims that social media functions as a neutral “digital town square.” Scholars of algorithmic governance therefore argue that misogyny online is not incidental but can be intensified by systems that determine who is heard, whose content is promoted, and which messages are suppressed, thus reinforcing existing social hierarchies across gender, race, and class.

== See also ==
- Exploitation of women in mass media
- Gamergate
- Gender studies
- Misandry
- Misanthropy
- Misogyny in hip hop culture
- Misogyny in horror films
- Misogyny in sports
- Reply guy
- Sexism
- Sexuality in music videos
- The Bro Code: How Contemporary Culture Creates Sexist Men
