= Thomas Keith =

Thomas Keith may refer to:

- Thomas Keith (film director), American filmmaker, educator and anti-sexist activist
- Thomas Keith (politician) (1863–1916), British Columbian politician
- Thomas Keith (surgeon) (1827–1895), Scottish surgeon and amateur photographer
- Thomas Keith (soldier) (died 1815), Scottish soldier who converted to Islam
- Tom Keith (1946–2011), American radio personality
