= Shira Tarrant =

American writer

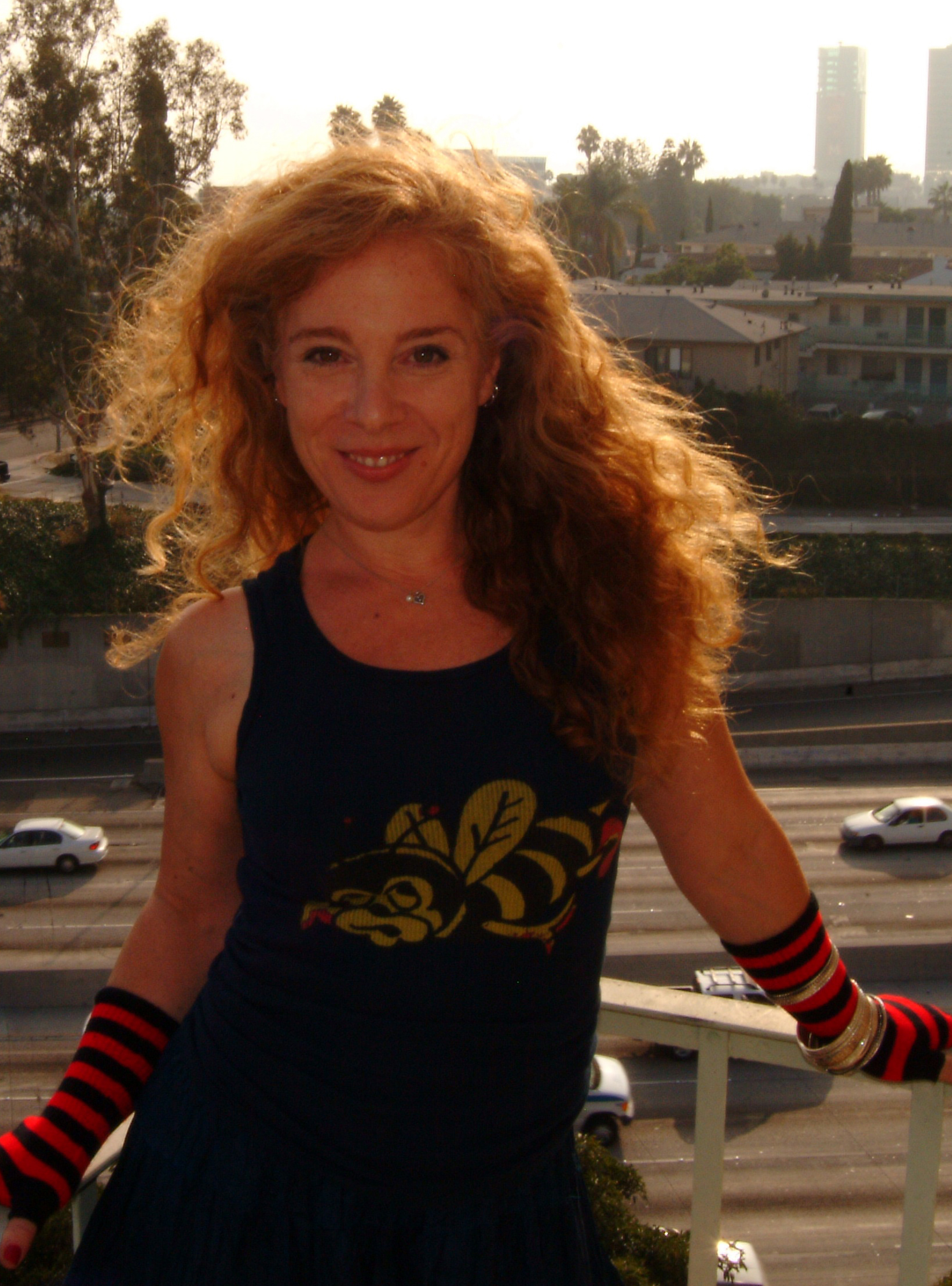
- Born: April 17, 1963 (age 63)
- Education: University of California, Los Angeles
- Occupations: Author, professor, feminist
- Notable work: Men and Feminism; When Sex Became Gender; Men Speak Out: Views on Gender, Sex, and Power
- Website: www.shiratarrant.com

Shira Tarrant is an American writer on gender politics, feminism, sexuality, pop culture, and masculinity. Tarrant's books include When Sex Became Gender, Men and Feminism, Men Speak Out: Views on Gender, Sex, and Power, Fashion Talks: Undressing the Power of Style, and the forthcoming New Views on Pornography. She is described as an "unconventional feminist" redefining gender rights, and is considered "a national leader in working with younger feminist men". She was identified in 2010 as an "extraordinarily accomplished thought leader" by the national Women's Media Center. In 2012, she was named a Glidden Visiting Professor at Ohio University.

== Career ==
Tarrant grew up in Cleveland, Ohio, attended Olney Friends School, and lives in Los Angeles. She received a PhD in political science from UCLA in 2001, working with advisor Carole Pateman. Tarrant's Ph.D. thesis topic was "Confronting the Bonds of Ideology: Feminist Social and Political Theory, 1945-1965". Tarrant also received a master of science in marriage and family therapy, extending her work to include emotional wellness and political mental health.

In 2006, Tarrant was an assistant professor of women's studies at Goucher College.

In 2010, Tarrant was selected by the Women's Media Center for its Progressive Women's Voices media and leadership training program, which identifies "extraordinarily accomplished thought leaders" from across the United States. In 2012, she was awarded the Glidden Visiting Professorship at Ohio University. She is currently Full Professor in the Department of Women's, Gender, and Sexuality Studies at California State University, Long Beach.

A frequent speaker at college campuses and public venues across the country, Tarrant is frequently quoted in print, radio, television, and online media. Tarrant was interviewed for the 2011 film The Bro Code: How Contemporary Culture Creates Sexist Men. She is a member of the National Advisory Board for the pro-feminist men's magazine Voice Male and a representative for the national organization Faculty Against Rape.

== Writings ==
Tarrant is the author of Men and Feminism (Seal Press), When Sex Became Gender (Routledge) and editor of the anthology Men Speak Out: Views on Gender, Sex and Power (Routledge) and Gender, Sex, and Politics: In the Streets and Between the Sheets in the 21st Century (Routledge). Her book, Fashion Talks: Undressing the Power of Style, with Marjorie Jolles, was published in 2012 (SUNY Press). A second edition of Men Speak Out appeared in 2013 from Routledge. New Views on Pornography: Sexuality, Politics, and the Law was published in February, 2015 (Praeger, co-edited with Lynn Comella) and in 2016, Oxford University Press published Tarrant's book, The Pornography Industry: What Everyone Needs to Know.

Tarrant's writing has appeared in Playboy, Times Literary Supplement, Bitch, Bust, Ms. blog, Women's Studies Quarterly, The Huffington Post, and other mainstream and academic outlets. In 2024, her chapter on “Tools for Improving Academic Mental Health and Holistic Wellbeing,” was published in Research Handbook of Academic Mental Health.

Within Tarrant's Men and Feminism, the first chapter titled “This Is What A Feminist Looks Like” introduces the issues of modern feminism, its growing inclusivity and relevance to male identified people (described from this point on as men). The chapter prefaces the book by defining feminism as “a movement for ending all forms of oppression, including gender based oppression” and explains the fundamental principles of the movement which include the necessity of confronting patriarchal, racist and binary thinking. While emphasizing how feminism applies to men (as the system of patriarchy also restricts men's roles), it highlights how by accepting and working within the framework of feminism, men can use their own gender privilege to stand up and better the lives of those oppressed in our current societal system. Relying on quotes and anecdotes, the first chapter of Men and Feminism provides insight to a growing demographic of men who consider egalitarian views and social responsibility to be common sense in today's world and persuades the reader to ponder “what men can offer feminism and what feminism can offer men”.

The chapter discusses the multiple ways in which all men can commit to acting as proponents for equality. The examples range from deconstructing traditional gender roles to calling out racist or sexist jokes, ultimately stressing the importance of “examining our own place in various systems of domination - how we benefit and how we’re held back” in order to generate social and political transformation. The chapter also introduces key aspects of feminism such as the importance of understanding intersectionality and refuting essentialism, effectively laying down the ground rules that are required when learning to think critically about all forms of oppression and the perspectives needed when working to mitigate them. By recognizing the fact that some forms of feminism have been unwelcoming of men's engagement within the movement historically, chapter one also proves that there is room for men today and invites them to be “comrades in struggle”. Furthermore, while the chapter acknowledges the politics inherent in labeling oneself a feminist, it recommends that men need not fear the term and emphasizes that the success of an effective and well received ally ultimately depends on their actions and level of commitment.

In addition to providing real life examples of men working through the lens of feminism and acknowledging opportunities for progress in daily life, the book is written in a clear and straightforward style, making it accessible to not only academics but also the target audience of young males. Overall, Tarrant's “This Is What A Feminist Looks Like” provides an informative overview of the movement's evolution and brings the reader to understand that in true bell hooks fashion, feminism is indeed for everybody.

== Bibliography ==
=== Books ===
- When Sex Became Gender (Routledge, 2006)
- Men Speak Out: Views on Gender, Sex and Power (editor) (Routledge, 2008; 2013)
- Men and Feminism (Seal Press, 2009)
- Fashion Talks: Undressing the Power of Style (with Marjorie Jolles) (SUNY Press, 2012)
- New Views on Pornography: Sexuality, Politics, and the Law (with Lynn Comella) (Praeger, 2015)
- The Pornography Industry: What Everyone Needs to Know (Oxford University Press, 2016)

=== Articles and essays ===
- “Women, Sex and S&M: Mainstream Media Totally Wrong About Female Desire — Again.” AlterNet, April 16, 2012
- “It’s a Dress, Not a Yes,” Ms. Magazine Blog, November 4, 2011
- “Why Are Conservatives Obsessed With the Sex Lives of College Kids?” AlterNet, April 17, 2011
- “The Silence Around a Fraternity Sexual Assault Case,” Jezebel.com, December 9, 2010
- "Pornography 101: Why College Kids Need Porn Literacy Training", AlterNet, September 15, 2010
- "Is Pornography Racist?", Ms. Blog, August 16, 2010
- "Porn: Pleasure or Profit? Ms. Interviews Gail Dines, Part III", Ms. Blog, August 6, 2010
- "Getting Down About Hooking Up", Ms. Blog, March 24, 2010
- "Judge Orders Rape Survivors to Take Lie-Detection Test", Ms. Blog, March 19, 2010
- "What's 'The Scoop' About Groping?", Ms. Blog, March 12, 2010
- "The Hurt Locker Blows Up More Than Bombs", The Huffington Post, March 2, 2010
- "California College: Up In Smoke?", The Huffington Post, June 19, 2009
- "Sonia Sotomayor: The Answer Rhymes With 'Fender'", The Huffington Post, May 29, 2009
- "Hip to Strip? Or Is it Time for Men to Stop Watching?", The Huffington Post, May 8, 2009
- "Guy Trouble", Bitch Magazine: Feminist Response to Popular Culture, Spring 2009
- "The Great Cover-Up: Can High Necklines Cure Low Morals?", Bitch Magazine: Feminist Response to Popular Culture, Winter 2008
- "Men Speak Out on Gender, Sex and Power", Voice Male, Spring 2007
- "The Little FemBlog That Wasn't", Barnard College Scholar & Feminist Online, Vol. 5 no. 2, Spring 2007
- "When Sex Became Gender: Mirra Komarovsky's Feminism of the Fifties", Women's Studies Quarterly Vol. 33 nos. 3 & 4, 2005
- "Who's Accountable for the Abuse at Abu Ghraib?", Off Our Backs. September–October 2004
