= Thomas Keith (film director) =

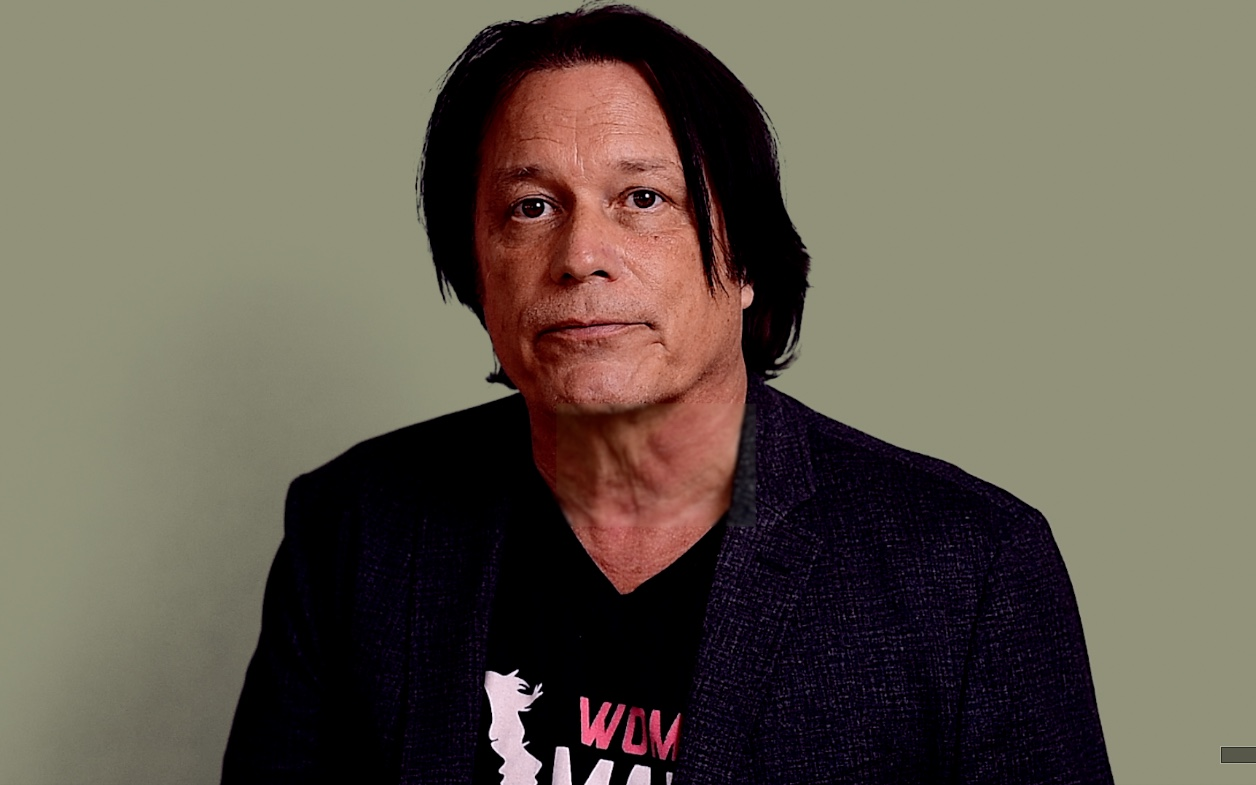
Thomas Keith, filmmaker

Thomas Keith is an American filmmaker, educator, and anti-sexist activist. He received both his Masters and Ph.D. in Philosophy from Claremont Graduate University. Keith is a professor of philosophy at California State Polytechnic University, Pomona and gender studies at Claremont Graduate University. He speaks to audiences throughout the United States on issues of masculinity, gender violence, media, and popular culture.

== Filmography ==
- The Empathy Gap: Masculinity and the Courage to Change (2015)
- The Bro Code: How Contemporary Culture Creates Sexist Men (2011)
- Generation M: Misogyny in Media & Culture (2008)
- Bullied, 2019
- How Does It Feel To Be A Problem? 2021
- The Clearance, (short) 2024

== Published Articles and Books ==
- Masculinity at the Movies, Routledge Press, 2025
- The Bro Code: The Fallout of Raising Boys to Subordinate Women, Routledge Press, 2019
- Masculinities in Contemporary American Culture: Confronting Complexities and Challenges of Male Identity, Routledge Press, (2017)
- "Breaking Down the Bro Code", Men Speak Out: Views on Gender, Sex, and Power (2nd edition), edited by Shira Tarrant (2013)
- "Men, Misogyny and the Future: When Men Challenge Sexism", Voice Male Magazine: Spring (2010)
- "Review of Pragmatism, Postmodernism, and the Future of Philosophy, Essays in Philosophy: Vol. 7: Iss. 2, Article 5 (2006)
- "Review of The Collapse of the Fact/Value Dichotomy and Other Essays, Essays in Philosophy: Vol. 6: Iss. 1, Article 14 (2005)
- Pragmatism, Race, and Inclusiveness Contemporary Pragmatism (2004)

== Awards and recognition ==
- Outstanding Faculty Member of the Year (Cal Poly Pomona, 2010)
- Most Inspirational Professor (CSULB, 2010)
- Student Life Award (Cal Poly Pomona, 2006)
- Golden Apple Award for Excellence in Teaching (CSULB, 2001)
