= Simp =

Slang for sycophancy

Simp (/sɪmp/) is a slang term describing someone who exhibits excessive sympathy and attention toward another person, typically to someone who does not reciprocate the same feelings, in pursuit of affection or a sexual relationship. The term originated as a shortening of "simpleton" in the early 20th century. During the 1980s, American rappers such as Hugh E.M.C., Too Short, Sir Mix-a-Lot, 2Pac, Three 6 Mafia and E-40 made use of the term in their songs. By the early 2010s, the term was adopted by members of the manosphere, incel, and Men Going Their Own Way (MGTOW) forums.

The term had sporadic usage until gaining popularity on social media in 2019 as an Internet slang term. This behavior, recognized as simping, is directed towards a variety of targets, including celebrities, politicians, e-girls, and e-boys.

== Origins ==
Originally a shortening of "simpleton", the New Partridge Dictionary of Slang and Unconventional English traces usage of the noun simp to 1903. An article in the February 1917 edition of Motion Picture Magazine by Arthur Le Kaser has an animated drawing of a female director yelling at a male leading man through a megaphone "Kiss Her You Simp, Hurry Up Camera!" The shortening has appeared, for example, in The New York Times as early as 1923, when the paper reported on a letter by one Lillian Henderson criticizing the members of two clubs in Atlantic City for unmarried men:

Those bachelor simps are afraid to take a chance and too tight to share their earnings with a wife.

Simp began to have the connotation of someone being "soft" and "overly sympathetic" in the 1980s, when it was used by West Coast rappers such as Hugh E.M.C., Too Short, and E-40. Simp was referenced by Sir Mix-a-Lot in his 1992 hit "Baby Got Back" in the lyrics, "A lot of simps won't like this song". 2Pac also used the term in his song "If I Die 2Nite" on his 1995 album Me Against the World. In 1999, the term was used in the Three 6 Mafia song "Sippin' on Some Syrup" as an antonym for pimp; Too Short has described a "simp" as equivalent to "a knockoff pimp". The term has been expressed as a backronym for Sucker/Sucka Idolizing Mediocre Pussy, which according to Gizmodo Australia is "telling of its 20th century origins".

A definition of simp appeared on Urban Dictionary in 2003, and the word continued to be used by rappers into the 2010s, when it was adopted by members of the manosphere, incel, and Men Going Their Own Way (MGTOW) forums alongside similar derogatory terms such as cuck, beta, and white knight.

The word became widely popular on TikTok in 2019, and soon also became popular on Twitch and Twitter (now X). According to Google Trends, interest in the term doubled between late 2018 and late 2019.

The word has been used by some fan communities who call themselves "simps" for a celebrity figure. According to The Daily Dot, the term is often used ironically; similarly, Magdalene Taylor at MEL Magazine said the term is "used mostly as a joke". Nathan Grayson writes at Kotaku that it is "difficult to find breaks in the chain of the word's linguistic lineage".

== Contemporary usage ==
In July 2020, the official Twitter account for Archie Comics said that it would permanently ban people from its YouTube channel for comments calling the comics' main character, Archie Andrews, a simp. The A.V. Club opined that, while it was "pretty safe to say that Archie Andrews is, quite simply, the simpiest of the simps," the Twitter post was likely an attempt at exploiting the Streisand effect for viral marketing. Contrary to the Twitter post, few, if any, comments on the Archie Comics YouTube channel accused the character of being a simp.

In August 2020, Australian politician Bill Shorten used the term on national television, saying on an ABC segment that Prime Minister Scott Morrison needed "to make sure he doesn't look like he's just a simp to Donald Trump".

In September 2020, users of Reddit created a pledge called "No Simp September", similar to No Nut November (a month-long abstention from masturbation). Participation in "No Simp September" required posters to abstain from upvoting women's photos, watching pornography, and "giving money to online sex workers", including "e-girls". In October, Mikael Thalen at The Daily Dot described Twitter users as "simping hard" over leaked photos of Hunter Biden.

A November 20 article in Vox about posting cringe on TikTok discussed the character of TikTok user Nate Varrone called "Mr. Simp Sexual", one of the "biggest stars" of the genre. Varrone explained the character thus:

He's from Michigan and he had a girlfriend named Melissa that he just wants back so fucking badly [...] He's just not in a good place right now, emotionally. I think he uses TikTok to fill the hole in his heart and find a new lover. The horniness this guy has, no human has ever felt that amount of horny in their entire life. It's like he has a curse. He thinks he has to hook up immediately or else he'll die.

In January 2021, Vogue reported on an "adoring" Instagram account of self-declared "simps" expressing affection toward then-Georgia Senate candidate Jon Ossoff. Ossoff won the election and was sworn in as a senator on January 20, 2021.

== Reception ==
Upon achieving broad popularity, it began to be used more loosely. In April 2020, an opinion piece in Men's Health described the use of the term as "pretty messed up", and men who labeled others with the term as "entitled assholes", saying, "if you've ever complimented a woman, apparently you're a simp". Hayley Soen writes at The Tab that "the simp has come to take the place of the softboi", describing him as "a boy who is a romantic failure [...] definitely the type of boy you'd tell the girls is 'a little too nice'", and "probably doesn't even have a lads' group chat"; Soen writes that the term is used "sometimes to describe even the bare minimum level of respect between a man and a woman".

According to the Evening Standard, while "the term could also have some value if it undermines a culture of stringing people along emotionally", it also had "potentially offensive connotations". In The New York Times, Ezra Marcus and Jonah Bromwich describe the term as a misogynist insult, one which "expresses discomfort with equality when it comes to gender, and offers a simple way to dismiss the people causing that discomfort".

Anna María of The Daily Dot writes that while the term is mostly used "ironically and without misogynistic undertones", "it doesn't take much to be called a simp" in some anti-feminist spaces, and that "everything from pining after a crush to actually respecting women could be considered simping". Taylor writes that the idea of the "simp" most often "seems to be a guy who simply treats women well, or just not like trash" and is "just another scapegoat for MGTOW misogyny".

=== Twitch ban ===
In May 2020, Kotaku reported that Twitch was "cracking down on" custom emotes using the word "simp", and had been "on a simp emote deleting spree" since late February. Twitch often requires its "partners" to submit custom emotes for approval prior to users being permitted to embed them; most of these emotes simply depicted a streamer or a fictional character holding up a sign with "SIMP" written on it, or were rasterizations of the text of the word itself. By December 2020, the word was described as a "favorite in the Twitch community" by The Verge.

Twitch announced in December 2020 that administrative action would be taken against the accounts of streamers and commentators who used the word, along with "incel" and "virgin", saying that those words were offensive; Twitch COO Sara Clemens said during a "town hall" live-stream that, while use of the words would be permitted under approved circumstances, Twitch would be "proactively denying" custom emotes that included the words. This ban was part of a broader expansion of Twitch's list of forbidden content; the policy, viewable on Twitch's website, also prohibited posting that "expresses inferiority" based on "moral deficiencies". At the time of the announcement, the policy was planned to take effect on January 22, 2021.

Reception to the announcement and proposed policy changes was largely negative; Bryan Rolli at The Daily Dot wrote that Twitch would "probably have a hell of a time enforcing the 'simp' ban", and Gizmodo said sarcastically that "actual simps and virgins [were] still welcome" on the streaming site. Screen Rant said that a blanket ban on "simp", "incel" and "virgin" contrasted unfavorably with a "context is needed" policy on the much more offensive racial slur "nigger". According to Ars Technica, Twitch had an "inconsistent history in responding to reports of problematic behavior".

In interviews with Kotaku, people affected by the ban described their channels' use of the term as mostly benign—one streamer said it was "mostly banter and, in some cases, a compliment". Another streamer, while acknowledging that the word was sometimes used to describe "quite creepy" behavior, said her use of a "simp" emote was "mainly just a joke within my community".

== See also ==
- Glossary of 2020s slang
- Reply guy – Internet slang term
- Alpha and beta male – Slang terms for men
- Nice guy – Term in popular psychology
- Soy boy – Pejorative for men perceived as feminine
