= The Bro Code: How Contemporary Culture Creates Sexist Men =

The Bro Code, How Contemporary Culture Creates Sexist Men
- Film poster
- Directed by: Thomas Keith
- Produced by: Thomas Keith
- Cinematography: Michael Enriquez, Mitch Lemos
- Edited by: Thomas Keith
- Release date: October 2011
- Running time: 58 minutes
- Language: English

The Bro Code: How Contemporary Culture Creates Sexist Men is a 2011 documentary film created by Thomas Keith. The film has been described as a treatise on misogyny.

== Summary ==
Thomas Keith explains that men learn to become womanizers when they are young, and women know to make themselves smaller. At an early age, kids mimic what they see on TV and learn from what they see, imitating or copying whatever is being shown on TV. Things like listening to popular music or watching music videos, movies, actors, reality TV shows, and sometimes pornography at a young age and teaching men or boys that women are only sexual beings. Men are taught to be in control at all times and have as many sexual partners as possible. The men think this is what gives them power. At the same time, women are taught to be competitors of the man's attention. Because men want to control, women are to dumb themselves down, which makes them more attractive. But the more educated and independent, the more unattractive she is. Thomas Keith states, "The main traction of the woman who is perceived to be dumb by the womanizing man is that she is nonthreatening to his supremacy to his alpha male desire to control women."

== See also ==
- Exploitation of women in mass media
- Gender studies
- Misandry
- Misanthropy
- Misogyny in rap music
- Gender in horror films
- Misogyny and mass media
- Misogyny in sports
- Sexism
