= Reply guy =

Internet slang term

Reply guy is an internet slang term for someone who excessively responds to social media posts, often in an annoying, condescending, or overly familiar or flirtatious manner. Reply guys are often men, often with few followers of their own, and tend to respond to posts by celebrities, those with large follower bases, or women. The phenomenon has been called an example of benevolent sexism.

== Origins ==
The term reply guy has been used with less negative connotations at least as far back as 2012, when a social media manager for the Applebee's restaurant chain became known as "Applebee's Reply Guy" on Facebook for regularly responding to comments left on the page. By 2015, term shifted more toward referring to someone whose posts were perceived as annoying, rude, or as mansplaining.

== Actions by social media platforms ==
In 2020, Twitter released a feature to allow users to limit who can reply to their tweets to only people who follow them, or to only people they mention in a tweet. This was described by Vox as motivated in part by a desire to reduce unpleasant interactions with reply guys.

In 2023, an experimental feature was implemented in the Mastodon Android client to display a reminder when users compose a response to a stranger, or to a post that is over three months old. This was described by TechCrunch as an attempt to "tackl[e] ... the scourge of the 'reply guys'".

== See also ==
- Simp
- White knight § Modern use
- Spamming
