= Misogyny in sports =

Objectification, degrading, shaming, or absence of women in athletics

Misogyny in sports includes different discourses, actions, and ideologies present in various sporting environments that add, reinforce, or normalize the objectification, degrading, shaming, or absence of women in athletics.

== Male bias ==
Misogyny can be defined as dislike of, contempt for, or ingrained prejudice against women. It can be seen in many ways, including hostility, sex discrimination, social exclusion, and disparity in media coverage. Nineteenth century views of women's involvement in sports gave the impression they were absent altogether. Most of the discussion was centered around middle- and upper-class white women and their health concerns to the exclusion of all other groups.

Women's participation in sports during the next century grew across the board, but there remains an undertone that women do not belong, including calling into question their sexuality or femininity.

The sexism experienced by women in sports also tends to be more overt than sexism in other workplaces and organizational settings. For example, in more recent years, champion tennis player Serena Williams has been verbally attacked for her appearance while wrestler Ronda Rousey has been constantly questioned about her sexuality. Sexist remarks made in many workplaces have been discouraged by displays of social disapproval and the potential threat of organizational reprimand. This has forced misogynistic views to be more subtle in these settings, taking the form of microaggressions or remarks in the form of benevolent sexism. In the sports industry, in comparison, overt sexist remarks are still commonplace and tend to result in less public backlash than similar statements given in other settings.

In 1967, Kathrine Switzer was the first woman to run the Boston Marathon. She was physically attacked by race official Jock Semple who tried to remove her from the race, yelling "Get the hell out of my race." More recently, prominent sportswomen Serena Williams and Ronda Rousey, as well as Women's World Cup soccer players, have spoken out about misogyny in sport. Female sportswriters have also become more involved in the discussion, some to their peril. Journalist Julie Dicaro was personally attacked after she reported on rape allegations against Patrick Kane, the Chicago Blackhawks star player.

=== Demeaning language ===
A 1993 study, conducted by Michael Messner, found that women were described with words like "girls" and "young women", while men were described with words like "young man" and "men", but never as "boys". Demeaning language is based on whether it is damaging or causing a decrease in reputation or status of someone or something, also relating to character.

Male dominating sport culture is continuously reinforced from a young age. Starting in little leagues and continuing up until the professional leagues, boys and young men are taught how they should behave on the field. Coaches and popular culture constantly deliver messages that emphasize hypermasculinity. They use aggressive language towards their players, telling them to "man up" or to stop "playing like pussies", or telling them that they throw/run/play like a girl. The worst thing to be called or compared to in sports is a woman, and it is the quickest way to cut someone down. In an interview with sports journalist Julie Dicaro, a man said, "no offense, but sports is where I go to get away from women". Demeaning statements like this about women only reinforce that the sports world is no place for a woman.

== Iran Islamic law ==
In October 2026 Islamic Republic regime changed laws and globally banned and disallowed women doing sport outdoor and/or in open public spaces including female runners running races.

== Gender gap ==
=== Coverage in media ===
The popularity of sports across the globe has not eliminated misogyny in sports coverage. Women's sports still suffer from lack of exposure.

Sports media is male dominant: 90.1% of editors and 87.4% of reporters are male. In televised media, approximately 95% of anchors and co-anchors are male. Women's sports have been underrepresented in comparison to men in their respective sports. Widespread gender discrepancies hamper the support and appreciation of female athletes in professional sports. Female athletes struggle to obtain the same degree of visibility and sponsorship opportunities as male athletes, whose accomplishments frequently dominate mainstream sports coverage. According to Cheryl Cooky's TEDx talk, a professor in American studies, gender, and sexuality at Purdue University, the marginalization of female athletes in mainstream sports media and sponsorship opportunities is nothing new. According to Cooky, female athletes need more visibility to ensure their access to necessary resources and financial security, which has an impact on their professional development. The support networks for female athletes are insufficient, which contributes to the persistence of the gender gaps that already exist in the sports sector. The NBA pays its players roughly 50% of the league's revenue, this includes media coverage, ticket sales, how profitable the brand is, and the revenue that comes from the sport itself which is split between all the teams. The Women's National Basketball Association (WNBA) pays its players less than 25%, specifically 22.8%, of the league's revenue. This revenue comes from coverage and game attendance. Game attendance has gone up in 2017 reaching its highest-grossing year with an average of 7,716 fans per game. " Despite having an increase in fans, the WNBA is not getting the same coverage as the NBA which adversely affects their salaries. In 2014, ESPN paid the WNBA $17 million for broadcast rights but yet only 2% of airtime on SportsCenter, their flagship show, was allocated to women sports with an even smaller percentage being given to the WNBA. The WNBA was forced to broadcast a livestream of 17 games in order to reach fan bases and garner media attention. Roughly 95% of sports content in media is focused on men, despite women making up 40% of all sports participants.

The quality of the stories and coverage themselves is also significantly lower than the men, including gag stories involving sexual dialogue or emphasizing the female bodies. Regarding the games themselves, the women have lower quality, editing mistakes, and fewer camera angles with fewer commentators. A longitudinal study conducted by researchers from Purdue University and University of Southern California of media coverage in sports and the differences found between males and females. Since the start of the 1980s, women's sports have had lower production quality while broadcasting, according to the study's author Toni Bruce. This was done by using lower sound quality, lower graphic quality, and fewer camera angles which presents women's sports as less dramatic and less entertaining. As well as low quality broadcasting, in almost every story of a male team or male player there is an interview or analysis done by a professional athlete or commentator as compared to 1/3 of the stories on female athletes or teams include interviews. Another study found that, between 1989 and 2000 sexist language was often used to describe female athletes and teams, sexualizing them and focusing on their families. From about the mid-2000s, language turned "gender bland", promoting a sexist slant by means of unenthusiastic recitals of performance, lending a lackluster patina to them as compared to men's. The researchers suggest that gender bland sexism elevates men with more entertaining language so that they garner more followers and media attention, taking the spotlight off female sports. The dominant language which plays a major role in media coverage of men's sports is largely absent in female sports coverage. Commentators talk more about statistics which, according to the study, were uninteresting. A lot of stories about women are also what audiences consider gag stories. In one example, SportsCenter ran a 13-second story on a "weightlifting granny". The researchers suggest that the prevalence of such stories undermines the standing of women in sports.

The media depicts women to be over-sexualized, which represents these women to be only objects of desire. The perception from society poses a threat to women’s standards which then implies a specific degree of sexuality that is only appropriate with some beauty standards. Some of the exploitation of women within the media causes self-objectification within women who are self-conscious and conditioned to evaluate their appearances based on societal views.

Looking beyond just how much screen time women's sports receive, research shows that the way commentators and media personnel cover female athletes actually reinforces sexist ideas. While watching sports, broadcasters often focus on the females looks, relationships and/or personal life instead of the sport they are playing and actual skills (Fink, 2016). On the other side, male athletes are almost always judged strictly on their talent, athleticism and performance. This difference in media coverage treats female athletes more so as objects to look at rather than fierce competitors, which downplays their achievements and makes women's sports as a whole seem less valuable.

=== Pay gap ===
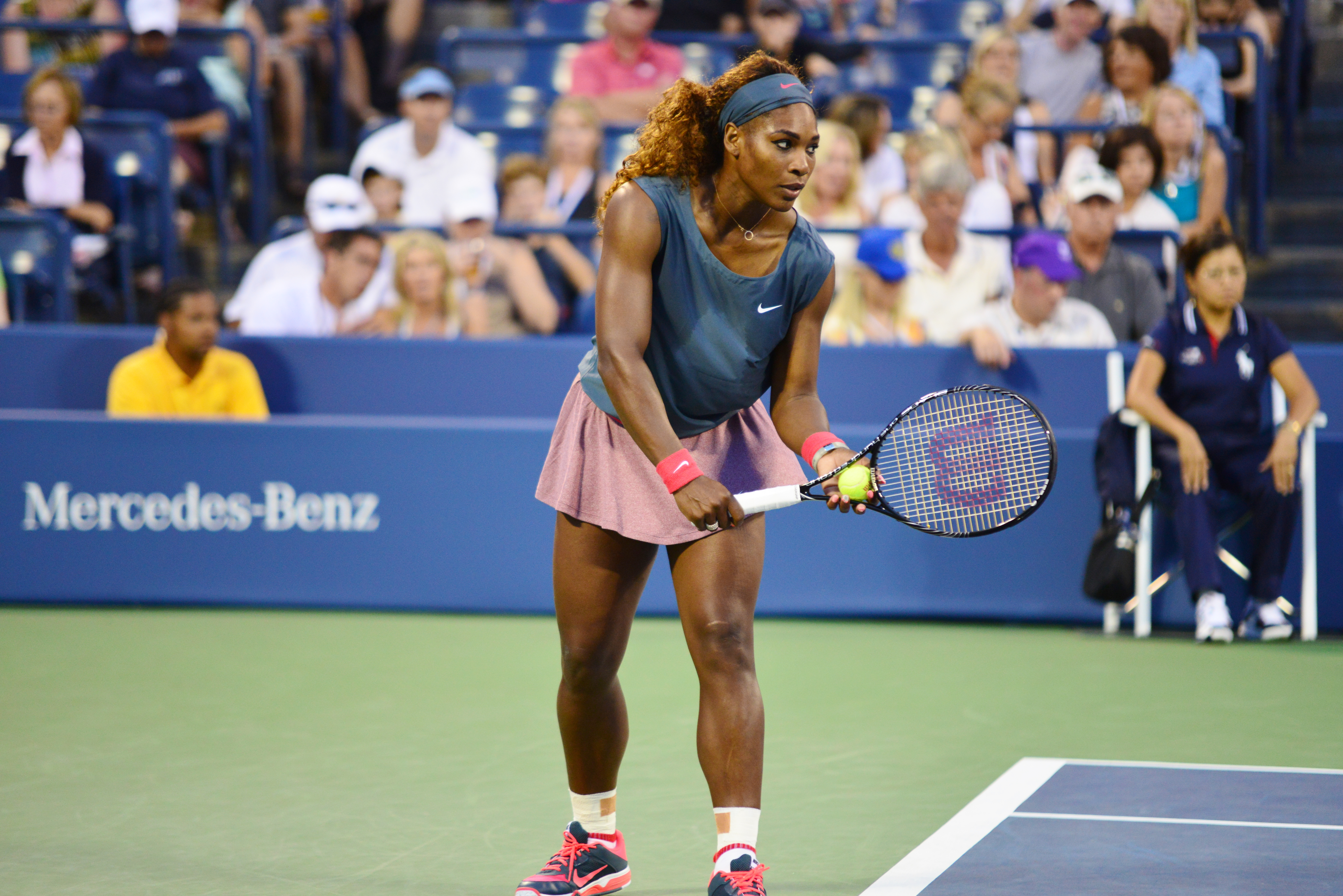
Serena Williams, the highest-paid woman in sports in 2017

The pay gap can be defined as the relative difference in the average gross hourly earnings of women and men within the economy as a whole. Of the Forbes 100 most paid athletes only one is a female, Serena Williams, who lands at number 51. Williams, however, is the highest paid female athlete according to data based in the year 2017. Within the sport of tennis, according to The New York Times, women make an average of 80 cents for every dollar a man makes. This pay gap matches the current pay gap in the workplace throughout America as well. This difference means that roughly the 15th best male player makes almost $120,500 more than a female with the same ranking. In 2018, according to The Guardian, 71% of the world's top men earn more in prize money than females who have their same ranking. Between 2010 and 2014 the US Women's Open final drew a larger audience than the men. The 2007 Wimbledon Championships was the first tournament that offered equal prize money for male and female athletes. This may be the case during televised events and the grand slams, women are still not receiving as much in middle- and low- tier events; the most popular rationalization being that men play longer. The pay gap does not only happen while they are playing but occurs after when they make appearances on television as a tennis expert. In 2017 BBC had to disclose their pay salaries and it was found that Navratilova was paid roughly $15,000 for her assignment whereas her male counterpart, an equally as good tennis player, received between $150,000 and $200,000 for a similar assignment. The pay gap also spans to endorsements in tennis with Maria Sharapova grossing $23 million in endorsements and Roger Federer grossing $65 million, which is nearly triple. Males earn more in endorsements while getting paid more than females which shows a bias based on gender within the sport. Tennis remains as the one sport that has the most comparable and fair pay between men and women. Tennis receives the most female media coverage out of any other sport and is growing rapidly in popularity. According to Forbes, eight of the top ten best paid women athletes are tennis players.

Soccer in the United States and across the globe has high pay disparity between males and females. Based on data from 2015 from the World Cup provided by the US Soccer Federation, male athletes on the roster made $76,000 whereas women made $15,000. If the men were to win the World Cup they would receive $9.3 million as compared to the women who would win $1.8 million. This means the men earn roughly 5.5 times more than the women do. In 2015 the US women's soccer team won the World Cup and broke the record for largest television audience for a soccer game but earned $2 million less than the US male team that finished 11th. In terms of dollar breakdown this means that a woman earns $1 for each $17.50 a man earns in the World Cup. In the United States both the men and women national team are required to play 20 exhibition matches with other countries across the world. If the men win all 20 games they make $263,000 while the women make $93,000. On average every year the US women's soccer team is paid only 40% of their male counterparts. This pay gap in women and male soccer is not just in the United States but also in Europe. Premier League players, an elite league in the UK, would earn $772 per minute if they were to play every minute of the regular season. The same calculation would leave the women's premier team, the FA's Women Super League, with $16.7 per minute.

Athletes are not the only ones experiencing the gender pay gap however, it is also sport managers, sport designers, coaches, and operations manager. Based on the PayScale Survey marketing managers earn 82 cents for every dollar a man earns. An event coordinator earns 92 cents for every dollar a man earns and an athletic trainer earns 95 cents for every dollar a man earns. Many studies have been conducted to discover the emergence of the pay gap in sports. Coaches, specifically head coaches at Division 1 programs, suffer a wider pay gap. If we look at the University of Florida, a Division One team, the male head coach gets paid roughly nine times what the female head coach gets paid. Amanda Butler, the women's head coach, has a win percentage of .603 and gets paid $429,007. Mike White, the male head coach, has a win percentage of .696 and is paid $3,967,385. Despite both of their win averages being very similar the pay disparity between the two is high. Based on a study done by Alex Traugutt and other researchers from the University of Northern Colorado a pay gap is clearly highlighted. Through a sample of 72 head coaches in Division One Basketball teams across the nation, a male coach earns an average of $2,716,191 million whereas a woman coach earns an average of $689,879. The study then focuses on the disparity in pay between in male and female coaches in Division One Women's Basketball. On average a male coaching a D1 women's basketball team earns $821,959 whereas the female earns $631,763, which is about $200,000 less.

== FIFA World Cup ==
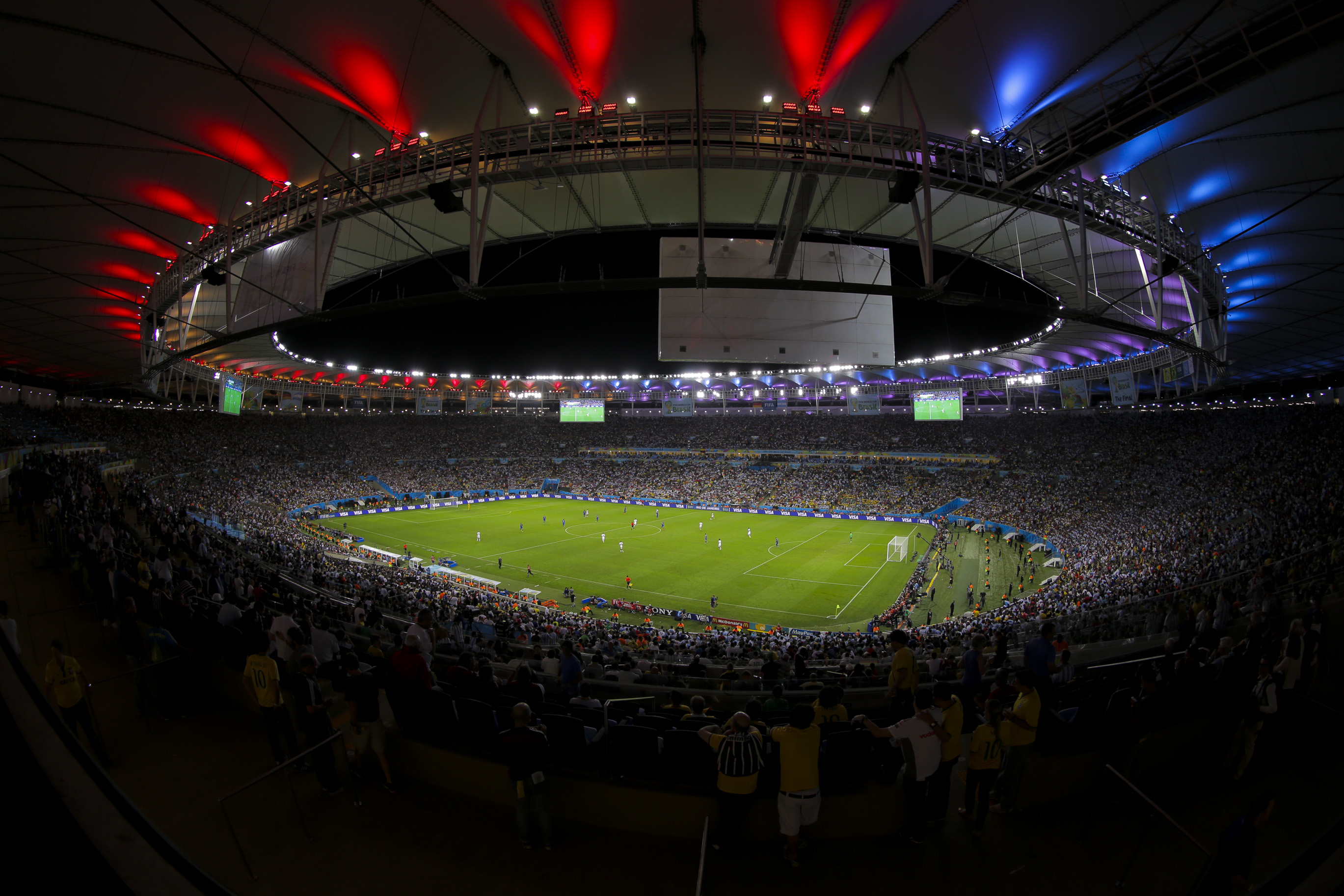
2014 World Cup Final between Germany and Argentina

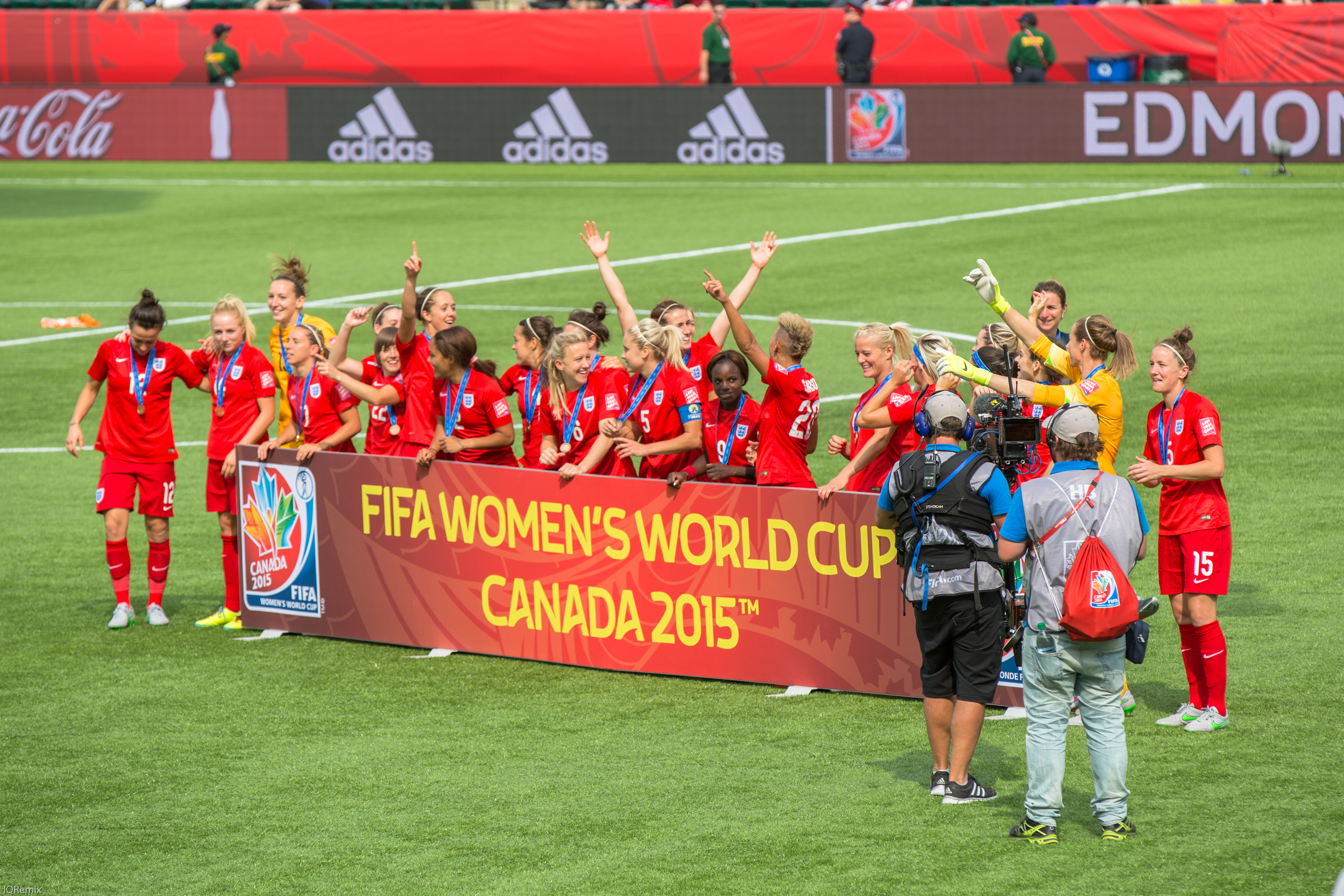
US Women's Team celebrating their World Cup win in 2015.

The Fédération Internationale de Football Association (FIFA) hosts an international soccer tournament every four years for both men and women. The next Women's World Cup is scheduled in 2027.

In the Men's World Cup in 2014 in Brazil, the US Men's National Soccer Team made it to the knockout round of the World Cup where they lost to Belgium, 2–1. After this loss, the USA men were able to collect $8 million for the team. In 2014 alone, $576 million was set aside for Men's World Cup rewards. That year, in the final match, the German men's team triumphed over Argentina, 1–0, and brought home $35 million. The 2015 Women's World Cup Final was the second most watched soccer game in the history of the United States, trailing the 2014 Men's World Cup Final by less than half a million viewers. The winning team, the US, brought home $2 million as a reward.

The 2015 Women's World Cup was also the first (and only) World Cup to be played on artificial turf. Players from all over the world took issue with this because of the increased likelihood of injury. US player Abby Wambach recalled that it was "like playing indoor soccer versus outdoor soccer. You don't realize it, but the subconscious mind doesn't allow you to play as physical." Michelle Heyman, forward on the Australian National Team, compared the fields to "hot coals". During the tournament opener between China and Canada the turf temperature was recorded at 120 degrees.

A group of women's players from around the world, including Nadine Angerer of Germany, Veronica Boquete of France, and led by Abby Wambach of the United States, went to court over the issue of turf fields, claiming that the use of turf only in the Women's World Cup was gender discrimination. They dropped the claim after FIFA refused to make a change, saying that it was within the requirements of Canada's bid for hosting the Cup. Coaches from around the world have said that complaining is useless because every team has the same conditions, and American defender Ali Krieger agrees, saying that "you have to adapt. This is what was given to us and we're going to do the best we can with it, and adapt and find a way to be successful, no matter what surface we're playing on."

The FIFA World Cup has been under fire for a long time and misogyny is one of the reasons. FIFA President Sepp Blatter, who announced his resignation in 2015 in the wake of criminal charges, suggested that women should "wear sexier uniforms to boost ratings".

In general, with a few exceptions, women's soccer does not have the same viewership as men's. According to FIFA, they are working hard to bring more attention to this half of the sport, saying that there are "untapped opportunities" that can be capitalized on.

== In the United States ==
=== Title IX ===
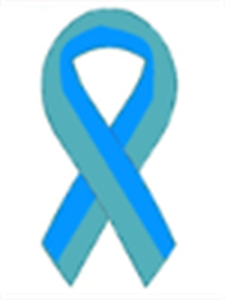
Title IX Harassment and Assault Awareness Ribbon

Girls and women have been discriminated and denied sports opportunities for centuries. Common arguments opposing the participation of women in sports included the argument that "menstruation and reproduction were so exhausting that women could not (and should not) participate in physical exercise" as well as that participation in sports makes women appear unnaturally masculine. For years, "Efforts to limit women's sport activity [which] continued as they became more involved in competitive sports" prevented many women from expressing their interests in sports, but through time different organizations and feminists have come up with strategies to uplift the participation rates of women and girls in sports.

Title IX for example is a legislation that was passed in 1972 to that provided different provisions that protected the rights of equality in sports for women and girls. It is a law that requires all educational programs receiving federal funding to provide equity for both boys and girls. Over the years, the law has been subject to over 20 proposed amendments, reviews, and Supreme Court cases. The law has acted as a way of motivating women and girls to participate more in sports.

After the introduction of the Title IX Amendment of 1972, the total of men vs women playing and participating in sports was around 3 million men, to 200,000 women. After the amendment was passed, the chances for women to participate in sports has gone up to 3 million high school sport opportunities. In 2018-2019, the total number of men in sports was around 4 million, while the total of women in sports increased to over 3 million.

The participation of girls and women in sports has brought about numerous immediate and long-term benefits that have a lasting impact on both the female gender and the society at large. Some of the different provisions of the 'Title IX' include equality in the different sports fields for both sexes. Essentially, as described on the U.S. Department of Education's website, this provision "protects people from discrimination based on sex in education programs or activities that receive Federal financial assistance". Title IX's goal was to bolster sports programs and opportunities in order to ensure that more people could become active in sports; and "contrary to the myth, Title IX has not starved men's athletic programs. Since Title IX was enacted, the number of men's and women's teams has grown and the number of men and women playing sports has risen". However, it is important that such provisions do not necessarily imply that equal amounts are spent on sports activities and matters for both sexes and athletic opportunities for boys and men to be reduced but simply means that both women and girls should not be discouraged and denied any sports opportunities. But there are still thousands of schools across the county are not in compliance with Title IX. The law covers all educational activities that receive public funding, so even though sports receive little public funding, they are still subject to Title IX, and are the most well-known application of the law. Opponents of the law say that has led to a breakdown of men's sports, pointing to the number of schools and institutions that have dropped sports since the enactment of Title IX, such as wrestling and cross-country.

Prior to the law, only 295,000 girls participated in high school sports and they received only 2% of the athletic budget. In 2016–2017, that number had risen to 3.4 million girls playing high school sports across the country.

Various studies have found that those who participate in high school athletics have higher wages, educational attainment, and educational aspirations later on in life. The rise in opportunities to participate in sports has led to a similar rise in labor force participation, which leads to more women with positive earnings.

Since the enactment of Title IX, women have made strides in college athletics for years. Other factors such as body shaping and fan culture are some of the motivation strategies that concerned individuals in the society are taking up to increase women and girl's participation in sports. However, more enforcement strategies need to be put in place to increase women and girl participation in sports since women discrimination in sports has not been completely eradicated since in some cases, women and girl's participation in sports is not approved. Additionally, it was thought that the creation of Title IX would translate into having more leadership positions in sports being filled by women but this effect has not been seen. In fact, "in the most visible and arguably most important positions in sport—head coaches, athletic administrators, and sports editors—women remain so marginalized they're essentially statistical tokens—that is, they represent less than 15 percent of the workforce population."

=== Scholarships ===
Before the Title IX, Equal Opportunity Law was established, not a single sports scholarship was given women in college sports in the United States. Since then, the number of scholarships given to women has increased each year to almost 85,000 scholarships in 2012, based on the "Number of Available College Athletic Scholarships" Compared to the 92,000 Scholarships available for men in that year.

The Title IX legislation was passed in 1972 and required schools that received federal funding to provide equality for boys and girls. Or having the same number of male sports teams as women. Because of that, many schools or universities have dropped specific sports teams such as wrestling and men's soccer. Before the law, less than 300,000 girls participated in high school sports, receiving 2% of the sports budget. Since then, that number has increased to over 3.4 million girls playing high school sports across the United States.

=== Women's opportunities and their leadership roles ===
As of 2013, female athletes received an average of 63,000 fewer opportunities than men at National Collegiate Athletic Association (NCAA) institutions.

Although Title IX encouraged more women to participate in sports at an NCAA level, the number of women in leadership roles has drastically decreased. Women in senior decision making roles has devolved to a number of 18% and women in athletic director positions hold only 17% in the year 2000. Although major strides have been taken by people in all realms of the sports industry to create more opportunities for women, women are still underrepresented in the industry as a whole. According to the NCAA, only 8.3% of Division I athletics directors are women. Only 21% of college women's athletic programs are headed by women, and women fill only 33% of all administrative jobs in women's programs. In high school, less than 20% of athletic directors are women, and less than 40% of directors of physical education are women. An American Society of News Editors (ASNE) newsroom census report in 1991 showed 63.1% of newsroom were men and 36.9% were women. In 2012, the percentages had not changed. By 2013, the statistics are slightly worse, showing 63.7% are men and 36.3% are women. Issues that still remain in terms of gender inequality in sport include the pay gap discrepancies, lack of opportunities for women in a male dominant industry, and lack of media coverage for women athletes. While there are women who enter top management positions in this industry, men typically receive a greater number of opportunities. Hegemony is described as a state of a "ruling class" referring to men at the forefront of society. This concept reaffirms the status quo that men demand authority in a society from imposition, manipulation, and even consent from certain groups. Due to this restricting concept, women find it much harder to advance in leadership roles simply due to what has already been set in motion by previous generations and previous cultures.

A study conducted by Alice Eagly and Steven Karau, two professors of psychology and management, explores the social role theory and role congruity theory in relation to how women and men assume different career and social roles based on societal expectations. Through the role congruity theory, Eagly and Karau explain similarities between gender roles and leadership roles, which suggest prejudice toward female leaders and potential leaders take two forms. "The first form show[s] a less favorable evaluation of women's potential for leadership because leadership ability is more stereotypical of men than women. The second form show[s] a less favorable evaluation of the actual leadership behavior of women than men because such behavior is perceived less desirable in women than men." This research establishes view points and supportive information on why there are fewer women in leadership roles than men throughout the sport industry.

The past two decades have granted a lot of changes in women's involvement within the sports industry due to three prominent factors: "the emergence of societal sensitivity to the activities of women, the impact of the Association for Intercollegiate Athletics for Women (AIAW), and such governmental legislation as Title IX". Despite the fact that there is an apparent increase in women participation in intercollegiate athletics, there is a decline in leadership roles and opportunities for women in assistant and associate director positions. In a study conducted by the Sports Management Review twenty assistant and associate athletic directors were interviewed in order to identify factors that may be influential to women's career development sports administration. The results concluded that personal and contextual factors affected career development such as interpersonal relationships with supervisors and professional development activities access helped the individual's career development achievement. Additionally, perceptions of gender and professional value ultimately affected women's career choices and thus their opportunities for advancement within the workplace. Decrease in athletic administrative and coaching positions is even greater for women of color. External barriers encounter by women include: "societal views, sex role stereotypes, negative attitudes towards female competence, and the prevalence of the "male managerial" model". Additionally, internal barriers that prevent occupational ambitions include: "fear of failure, low self-esteem, role conflict, fear of success, and the perceived consequences of occupational advancement and incentive value associated with such expectations". However, women of color in sport administration experience all of the above plus "racial discrimination, "womanism", systemic oppression, biased counseling at the pre-collegiate and collegiate levels, and a lack of minority women as role models and mentors". Although all women are facing some degree of inequality within the sports administrative work place, barriers are more severe for black women in the industry.

Jeanie Marie Buss is one example of a woman holding a powerful position in the sports industry. According to Forbes in 2011, Jeanie Buss "is one of few powerful women in sports management". Jeanie is the standing CEO and owner of the Los Angeles Lakers. Her responsibilities include running the entire Lakers organization, in addition to overseeing all business and basketball operation pertaining to the team while working closely with Tim Harris, the President of Business Operations. Adding on to her list of authoritative roles, Buss represents the Lakers on the NBA's Board of Governors. ESPN has gone on to note that Jeanie Buss is "one of the most powerful women in the NBA".

=== Women in Coaching ===
In the athletic sphere, women are underrepresented in the coaching sphere of athletics. In NCAA division one athletics, the amount of women coaching women's teams has drastically reduced. Going from almost ninety percent of coaches being women in 1972, to only 42 percent in 2007. In 1941 when the Women's Sport Organization was founded there was an influx of interest in women's sports. During this time period there was a significant amount of women coaches. That number dwindled due to the Intercollegiate Athletics for Women [AIAW] losing supporters to the NCAA. With the growth of women's sports and more women's teams being introduced the amount of female coaches shrank. By 1988, looking at Canada specifically, only 14 percent of national level head coaches and assistant coaches were women, an 85:15 ratio is considered skewed. The lack of women in coaching has been understood through many different avenues. It has been assumed that the lack of female coaches is due to the fact that there have always been gendered jobs, and even jobs that can be seen as androgynous have gendered aspects within them that support the binary between what is seen as women's work versus men's work. Coaching is generally seen as a masculine job. However, there has been a shift showing that women are moving into traditionally masculine jobs and are fighting to break the glass ceiling. Some explain the lack of women's coaching in recent times to a lack of same-sex role models, many young women do not have the chance to be coached by women but most young men are coached by men. Being able to see someone who looks like you in a position of power inspires others to reach for the same goal. Some assume that women do not want to coach, however, this is hard to prove. An example that disproves this theory is the experience of Kara Lawson, a woman who wanted to be a part of the NBA organization and wanted to be mentored by a current coach to grow her knowledge. Lawson was denied this due to the fact that she would be a supposed distraction to the male athletes because of her gender. There is a push to have women in more high level coaching roles, with the introduction of Jessica Campbell as the first female assistant coach in NHL history

=== Sexual harassment ===
According to the National Institute for Occupational Safety and Health (NIOSH), "working women face higher risks than men from job-related stress, and one of the most noxious stressors sexual harassment." The International Olympic Committee Consensus Statement defines sexual harassment as "any unwanted and unwelcome conduct of a sexual nature, whether verbal, non-verbal or physical." This form of harassment is a common fear among female athletes. Sexual harassment takes place within all different sport groups and may be perpetrated by a number of different people within the sports world. "The perpetrators of sexual harassment include trainers/coaches, spectators, teammates, sports managers, masseurs, and male peer athletes." A study conducted by Sandra L. Kirby and Lorraine Greaves on 1200 female, Canadian national team athletes concluded that the majority of reported acts of sexual harassment involved coaches. However, other figures including "medical doctors or personnel, physiotherapists, strangers, national team committee members, or site managers" were also involved in reported accounts of sexual harassment, just on a lower scale. The same study also concluded that "while some athletes related personal accounts of harassment and abuse, many reported the ongoing nature of these activities. They happened in a number of places (on team trips, during training or in private locations like the home or vehicle of a coach or older athlete) rather than restricted to a single and predictable site." The ongoing occurrences of sexual harassment may happen over a short or long period of time and almost always happen in private. In 1972, Title IX was passed and required female athletes equal opportunities in college. This turned many previously volunteer women's sports coaching jobs into paid coaching positions which made them more attractive. The number of men in coaching positions in women's college sports increased from less than 10 percent to more than 50 percent after 1972. This added to the unequal power dynamic between coaches and female players that could lead to sexual harassment.

There are a number of factors that contribute to the existence of sexual harassment of female athletes. Two of the most prominent factors are the lack of awareness of sexual harassment in the sports industry and the lack of knowledge on how to both seek and provide help. A study done in 2011 in Quebec called "Disclosure of Sexual Abuse in Sport Organizations: A Case Study" points to the many problems in sports organizations. Most instances point to women rarely, if ever, reporting assault or harassment in the sports business. Most coaches, athletes, and administrators were not even aware of existing protocols of sexual harassment. When questioned about this concerning issue, the administrators resorted back to their lawyers; assuming that the issue was far too complicated to tackle. "Harms caused by harassment and abuse still represent a blind spot for many sport organisations, either through fear of reputational damage or through ignorance, silence and collusion." Female athletes and sports industry employees need more education on what acts of sexual harassment look like, how to seek help, and who they can trust to speak out to. "All forms of harassment and abuse breach human rights and may constitute a criminal offence. Therefore, there is a legal and moral duty of care incumbent on those who organize sport, to ensure that risks of non-accidental violence are identified and mitigated."

Another factor that contributes to the existence of sexual harassment of female athletes is the male-dominated power dynamic between men and women in the world of sports. "Sexual harassment and abuse in sport stem from abuses of power relations facilitated by an organizational culture that ignores, denies, fails to prevent or even tacitly accepts such problems." In an article titled "Sexual Violence and the Coach-Athlete Relationship- A Scoping Review From Sport Sociological and Sport Psychological Perspectives", author Sonja Gaedicke notes that "The gendered social structure of sport organizations and the legitimate authority of coaches give them a position of power that is often unquestioned and uncontrolled." Because of this power dynamic between player and coach, especially between male coaches and female players, there is far more opportunity for male coaches to exert their power over the female players in a predatory or sexual manner. The system in which players and coaches exist is one that is overwhelmingly male-dominated, which can also lead to athletes struggling to speak out for fear of not being heard or taken seriously by their other male leaders or coaches.

Women in powerful positions, such as successful athletes, are often viewed as too assertive, thus receiving harassment for challenging the preconceived notion of a hierarchy. Targets of sexual harassment are more likely to be female because they may have masculine tendencies, and men feel the need to reassure their "masculine dominance". In addition, the male-dominated power dynamic also affects non athlete women of the sports world. One occupation that frequently experiences sexual harassment in the sport industry are female sport media print professionals. Female sport media print professionals are typically sports editors, sportswriters, sports columnists, and sports reporters. As reported by the Institute for Diversity and Ethics in Sport at the University of Central Florida in 2012, 90% of sports editors and 88% of sports reporters are men. The disproportion between men and women in this position may discourage female sport media print professionals from reporting such incidents of sexual harassment according to an article published by Christina Coleburn.

==== Consequences ====
In reference to the toll that sexual harassment takes on women, Boland states that "victims suffer physical, mental, emotional, and financial losses that can be devastating". As a result, many female athletes choose to stay silent about their sexual harassment. Discussed in the article "Sports Journalism Has A Major Sexual Harassment Problem", women working in the sport industry infrequently report incidents where they have experienced sexual harassment and inappropriate comments throughout their careers due to fear or losing their job. "The impact of sexual harassment is often measured such as somatic, physical and psychological/emotional health, wellbeing, work variables and career development. Psychological and somatic outcomes include negative effects on self-esteem and life satisfaction, low sense of self-confidence, negative effects on women's relationships with other men, anger, fear, anxiety, depression, feelings of humiliation and alienation, a sense of helpless and vulnerability, headache, sleep disturbance, weight loss or gain, gastrointestinal disturbances and nausea."

In addition, ongoing occurrences of sexual harassment affect victims by manipulating them to believe nothing is wrong and driving them to silence, which may ultimately prolong the sexual harassment. In a report published by CQ Press in 2017, author Susan Ladika highlights the fact that "While athletes have gone to prison for their sex crimes, studies show that relatively few accusations lead to arrest or conviction." This displays the "protection" that male athletes/athletic staff have. Ladika cites research that explains the distinctive privilege that the athletes receive, stating "schools, leagues and Olympic organizations frequently have failed to investigate credible allegations and that sports programs have ignored or covered up sex crimes by star athletes, who often receive preferential treatment from schools, teams and police."

==== Examples ====
The USA Gymnastics sex abuse scandal occurred over the course of several years, but came to light in the latter months of 2017 and early 2018 involved former doctor Larry Nassar. More than 250 young women accused Nassar of sexual harassment and abuse. Many of these women were seen and treated by Nassar as a gymnast. Because of his role as the USA gymnastics team doctor, Nassar was able to be alone with hundreds of young women and girls over the course of nearly two decades. Aly Raisman, a USA Gymnast, explained how the abuse from Nassar had occurred from such a young age, that despite strange thoughts about his treatment methods, she was taught to trust him which is why it took so long to figure out what was happening to her and many other gymnasts and come forward about it. The formerly discussed study, conducted by Sandra L. Kirby and Lorraine Greaves, states that some women admit becoming "desensitized" to verbal sexual harassment from coaches. It was not until the coaches were legally charged that the female victims realized the reality of what had happened to them.

Conal Groom, a former Olympic rower and U.S. National team coach, allegedly verbally abused and employed drill sergeant-like coaching tactics. He was accused of sexual assault and harassment multiple times at different rowing organizations across the country. A board member of Seattle's Pocock Rowing Center explained that "He was an Olympian and so there was a lot of latitude." He also had success with his "long record of seeing his athletes recruited by universities such as Harvard, Stanford and Princeton and tapped for prestigious national teams." Many parents were unaware of the extremity of Groom's behavior and some parents "stuck by him." One rower was unaware that his behavior was abusive until after watching a required video on identifying abusive coaches. Another rower experienced an incident of alleged sexual assault and confided in another coach who reported the assault to the child abuse hotline, a police report shows, and the Santa Barbara Sheriff's Office opened an investigation. Seven months after the survivor made the allegation, USRowing stepped in and temporarily suspended Groom from unsupervised coaching. SafeSports says Groom's case remains under investigation with no timeline for its completion.

== See also ==
- Misogyny in hip hop culture
- Misogyny in ice hockey
